= Molinary =

Molinary is a surname. Notable people with the surname include:

- Andres Molinary (1847–1915), American painter
- Marie Madeleine Seebold Molinary (1866–1948), American painter
