= Paul E. Poincy =

American painter

Paul Ėdouard Poincy
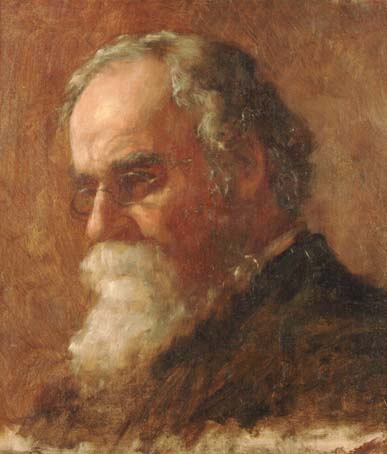
- Paul Poincy by Andres Molinary, c. 1900
- Born: 1833; New Orleans, Louisiana
- Died: 1909 (aged 75–76); New Orleans, Louisiana
- Occupation: Painter

Paul Ėdouard Poincy (1833 – 1909) was an artist in New Orleans, Louisiana, United States who specialized in portrait, religious, landscape, and genre painting.

== Biography ==
Paul Édouard Rossignol des Dunes de Poincy was born in New Orleans to a well-to-do family of French descent, and was part of a group of New Orleans artists whose cultural ties were more closesly related to France than the South or to eastern U.S. cultural centers such as New York City. He studied art in Paris at the Académie Julian and at the École des Beaux-Arts. His studies in Paris extended from 1852 to 1859, during which time he was influenced by Parisian artists Marc-Charles-Gabriel Gleyre and Léon Cogniet. On his return to New Orleans, Poincy opened a studio with French-born artist Richard Clague. He was well known for paintings of New Orleans street scenes and portraits of children.

He subsequently served in the Confederate Army during the U.S. Civil War.

Following his military service, Poincy had a close association with artist Victor Pierson. The collaboration resulted in the painting Volunteer Firemen's Parade, a noted work completed in 1872. Poincy was a founder of the Southern Art Union.

== Gallery ==
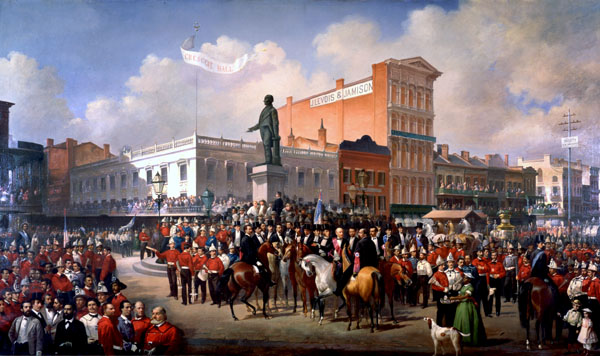
Volunteer Firemen’s Parade, March 4th 1872, 1872

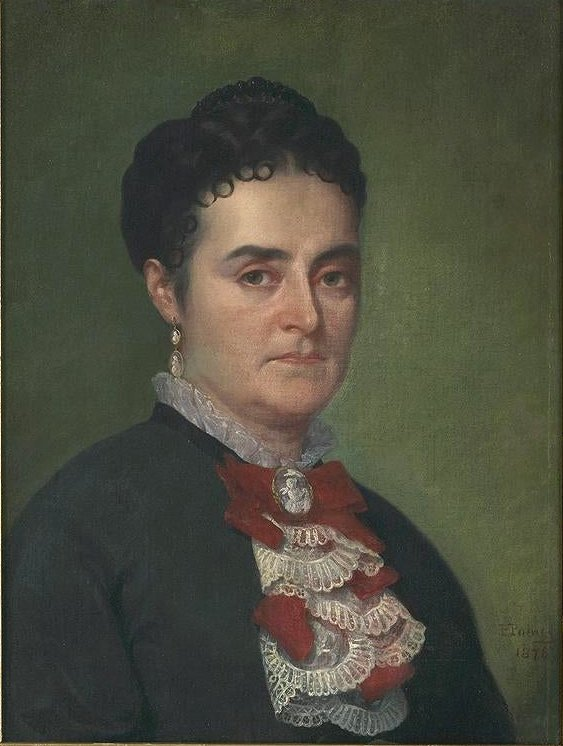
Portrait of Celeste Durel, the Artist's Wife, 1878

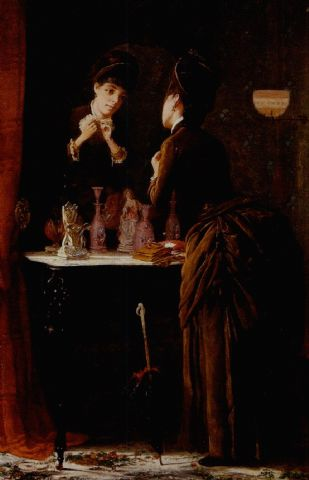
Elegant Southern Lady Preparing for an Afternoon Call, 1886

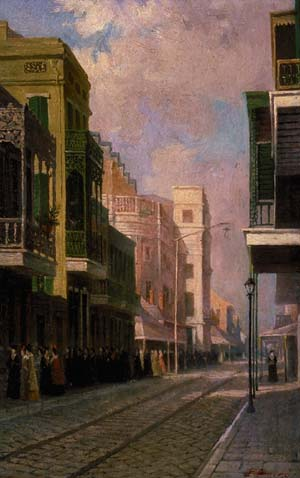
Ladies Leaving the French Opera House, 1895

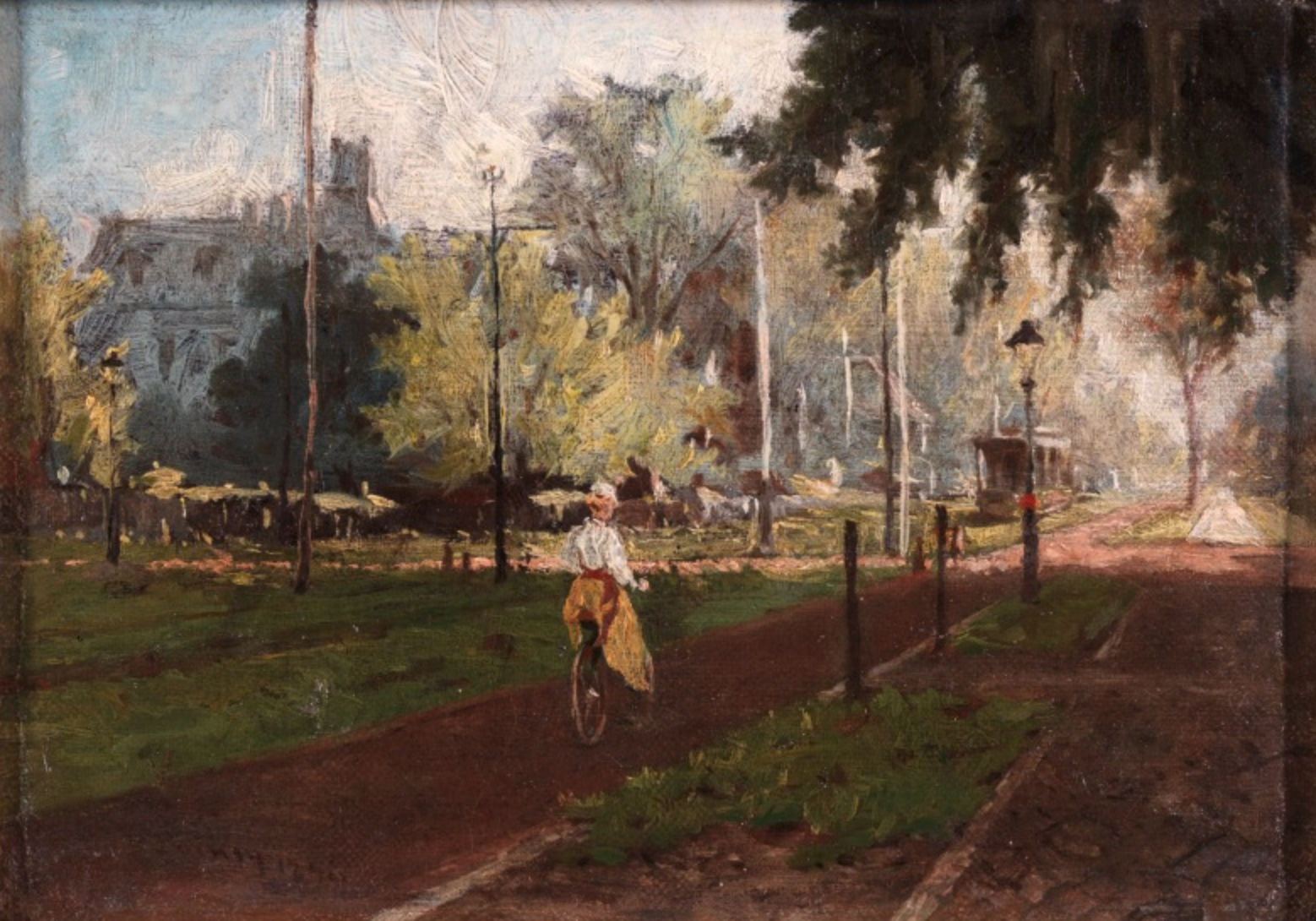
View of St. Charles Avenue Streetcar, 1898

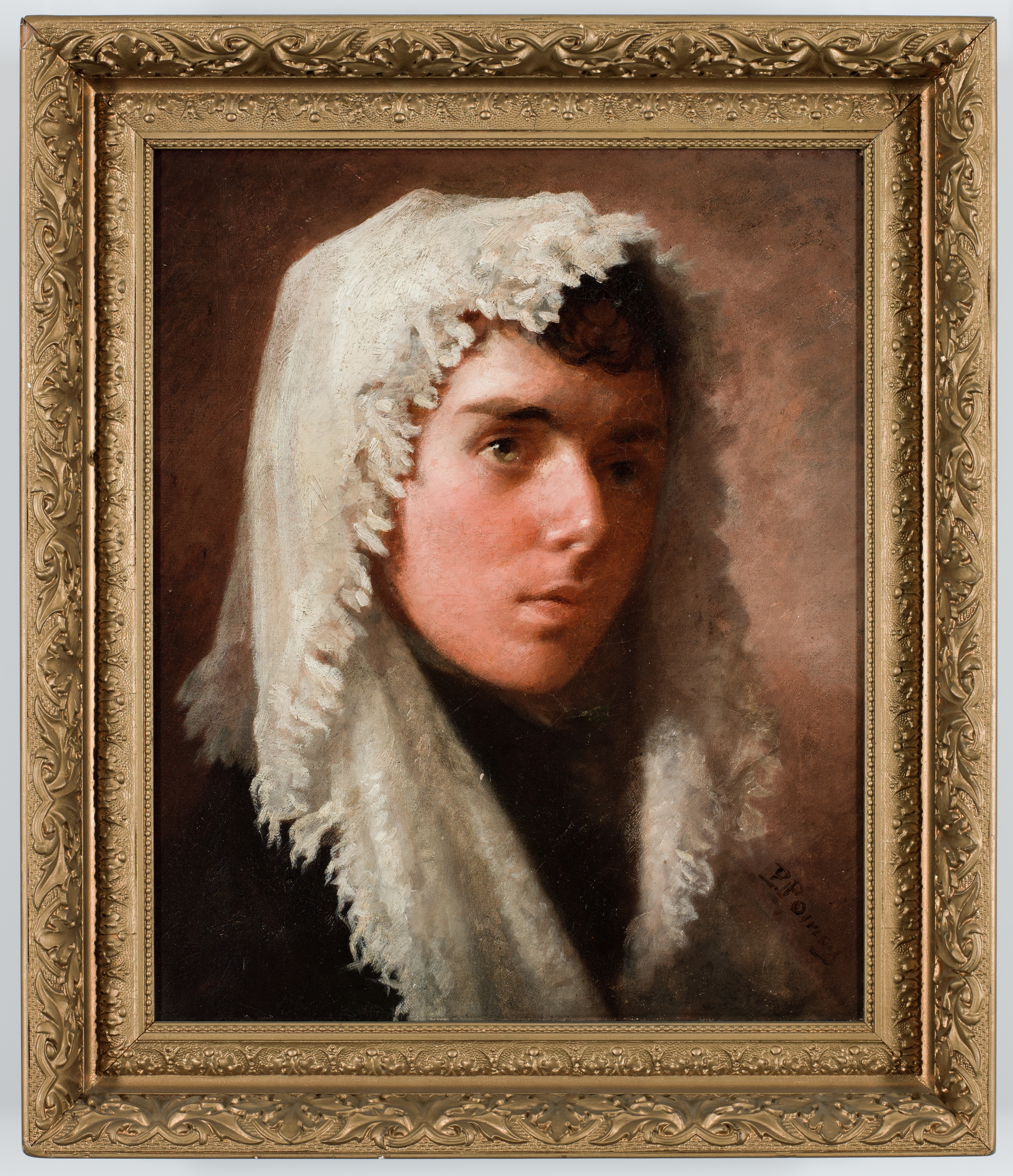
Portrait of Marie Madeleine Seebold Molinary, 1890-1905

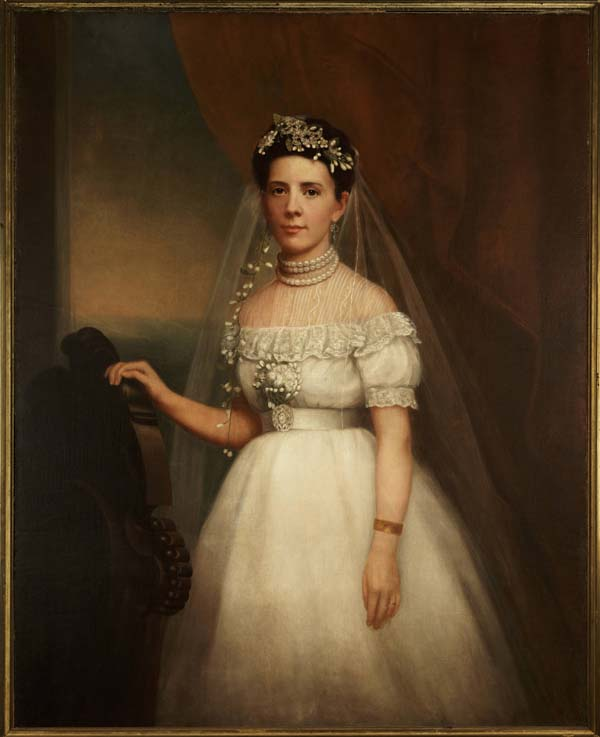
Portrait of Ernestine Sabourin of New Orleans on Her Wedding Day, 1896

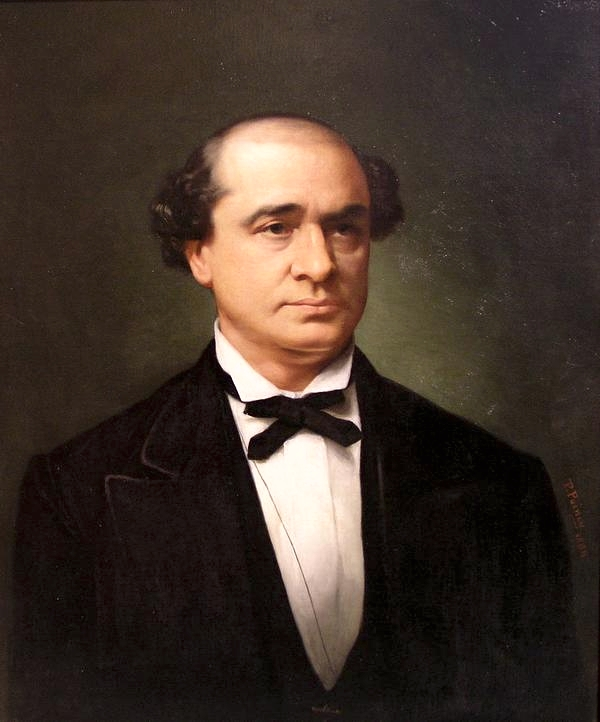
Portrait of Thomas Courtland Manning, c. 1909

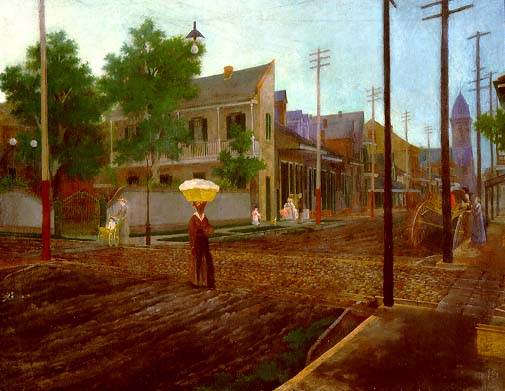
St. Claude and Dumaine Streets, Faubourg Tremé, 1895
