= Bror Anders Wikström =

Swedish–American artist (1854–1909)

Anders Wikström
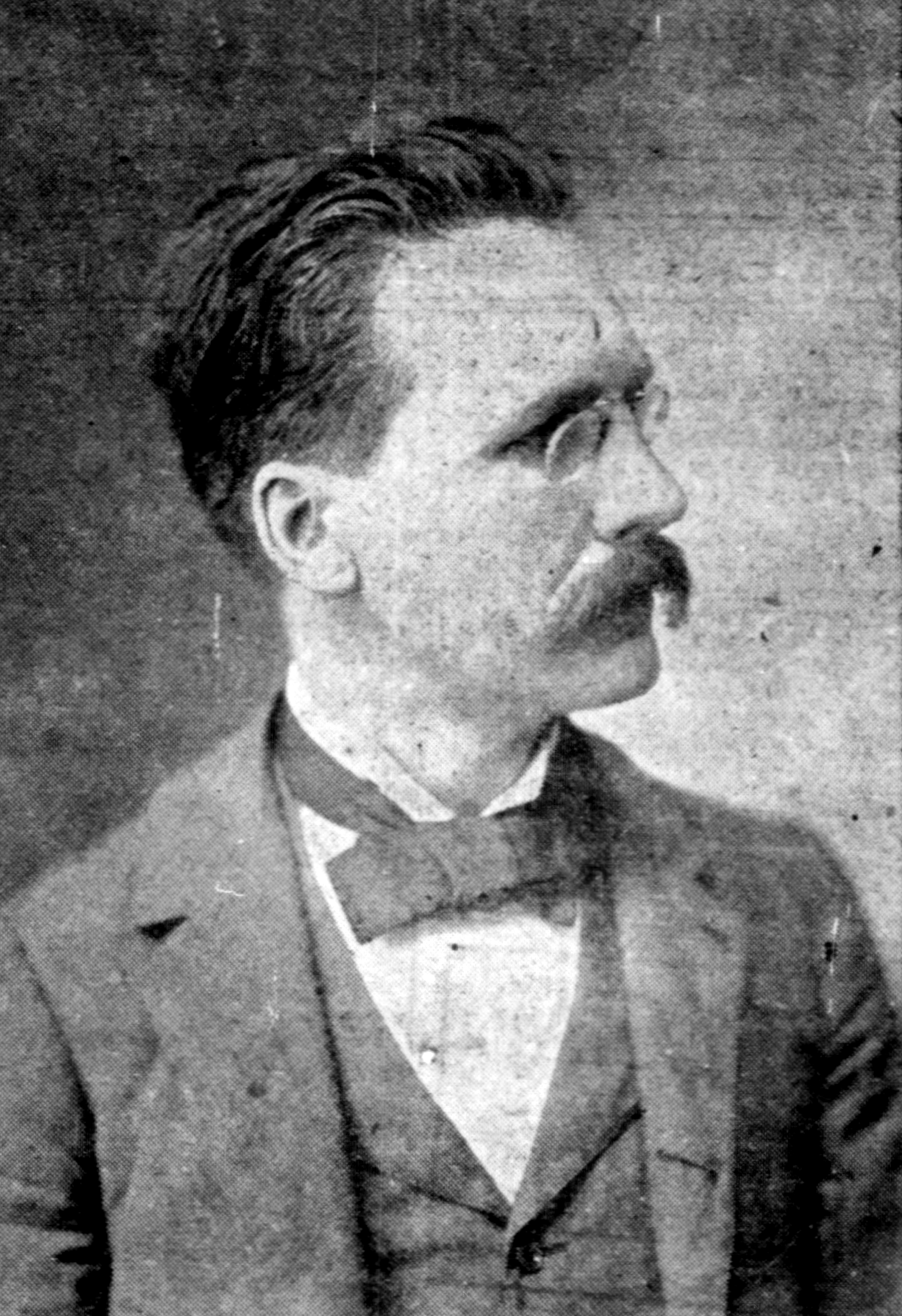
- Born: April 14, 1854; Laxå, Örebro, Sweden
- Died: April 26, 1909 (aged 55); New York City, U.S.
- Resting place: Metairie Cemetery

Anders Wikström (April 14, 1854 – April 26, 1909), also known as Bror Anders Wikström, was a Swedish and American artist, costume designer, and art teacher based in New Orleans. He was known for his work designing floats and costumes for Mardi Gras krewes around the turn of the 20th century.

== Early life ==
Wikström was born near Laxå, Örebro, Sweden, to mill manager Anders Wikström and his wife Carolina Roth. He had some training in drawing under Olof Hermelin while at the Karolinska Institut in Örebro, before graduating in 1869. At age 16, Wikström took to sea, signing on the ship Peru. He spent the next several years on ships carrying guano from South America to Europe.

Wikström studied in the navigation school at Gävle to be a sea captain, but his near-sightedness was too great a liability and, rejecting the idea of becoming a shipbuilder, he abandoned life as a sailor.

Over the objections of his family (and his fiancée, who ended their engagement), he enrolled at the Royal Art Academy in Stockholm and then studied in Paris under Rodolphe Julian and Filippo Colarossi, eventually becoming a magazine illustrator. In 1881, he illustrated a magazine article about life at sea, which inspired him to paint seascapes and other marine themed works.

== Career ==
By 1882, Wikström had relocated to the United States, spending about a year in Florida before settling in New Orleans, where he began teaching art classes and, in 1885, co-founding with Andres Molinary and others the Artists' Association of New Orleans.

In 1884, Wikström's ailing neighbor, Charles Briton, a fellow Swede, hired him to assist in designing Carnaval floats and costumes for the Rex Organization. With Briton's death that same year, Wikström was hired as Rex's main designer. He designed the Rex parade for 25 years, as well as Proteus for 10 years. Each parade required about 20 float designs, 100 costumes, and additional drawings for jewelry, masques, slippers, instruments, and other accessories. Because of the lead time needed to create a krewe's floats and costumes, at the time of his death in 1909 Wikström had competed the designs for his final parade, Rex's 1910 "The Freaks of Fable." Julia Massie, one of Wikström's students, managed the completion of his Rex 1910 designs.

From his base in New Orleans, Wikström travelled in the summers through the Caribbean and back to Europe. During these trips he sketched scenes that would serve as the basis for his popular marine and landscape paintings. He also returned to Sweden on these trips, connecting with Swedish artists and painting landscapes.

== Death ==
Wikström died suddenly on April 26, 1909, in New York. He had been in the city working on costumes and floats for the Hudson–Fulton Celebration marking the joint 300th anniversary of Henry Hudson's exploration of the Hudson River and the 100th anniversary of Robert Fulton's paddle steamer. Despite being ill for several weeks with dropsy, he continued work on the project. By his death, Wikström had for completed designs for 60 floats, along with rough designs for another 40.

== Gallery ==
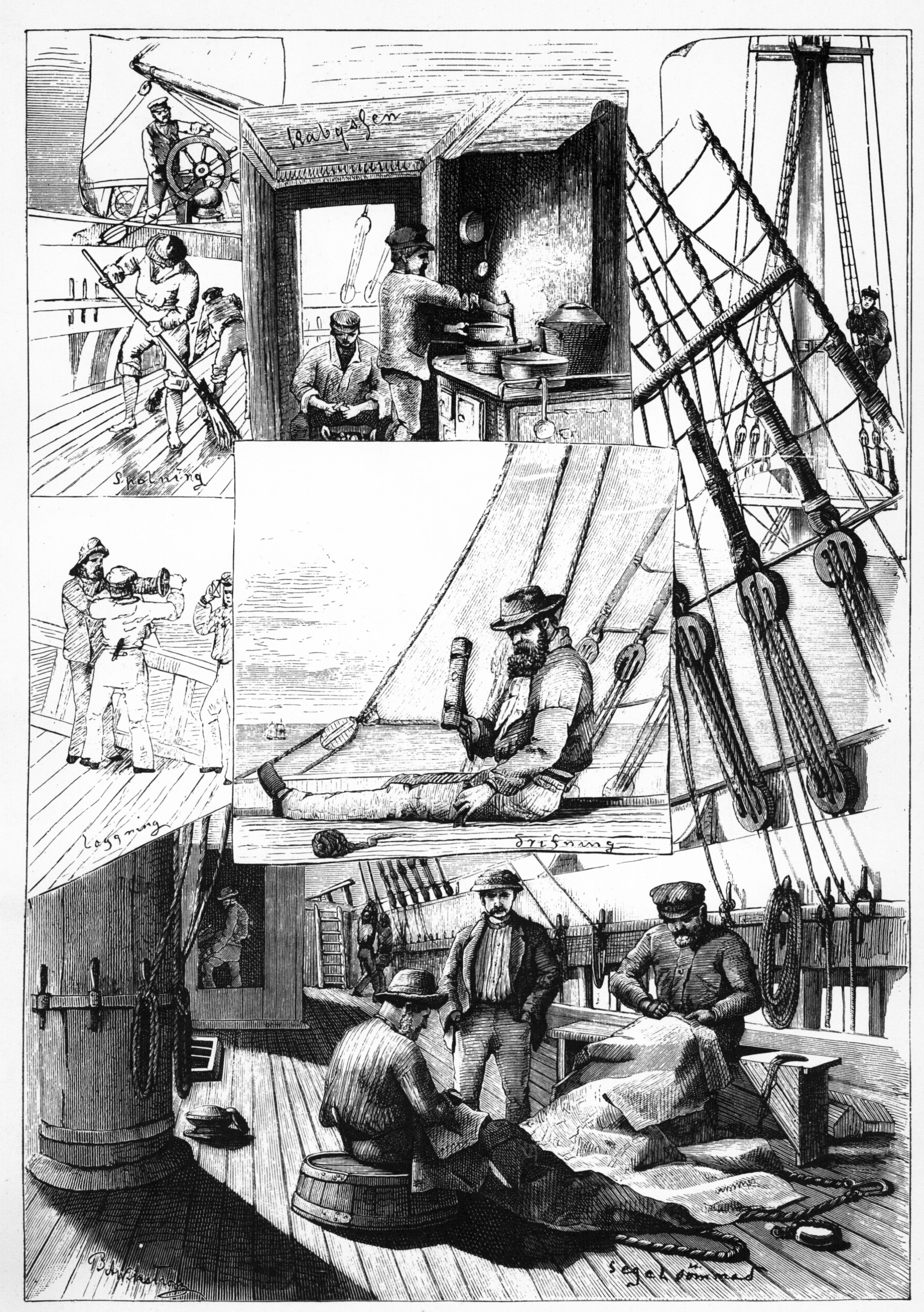

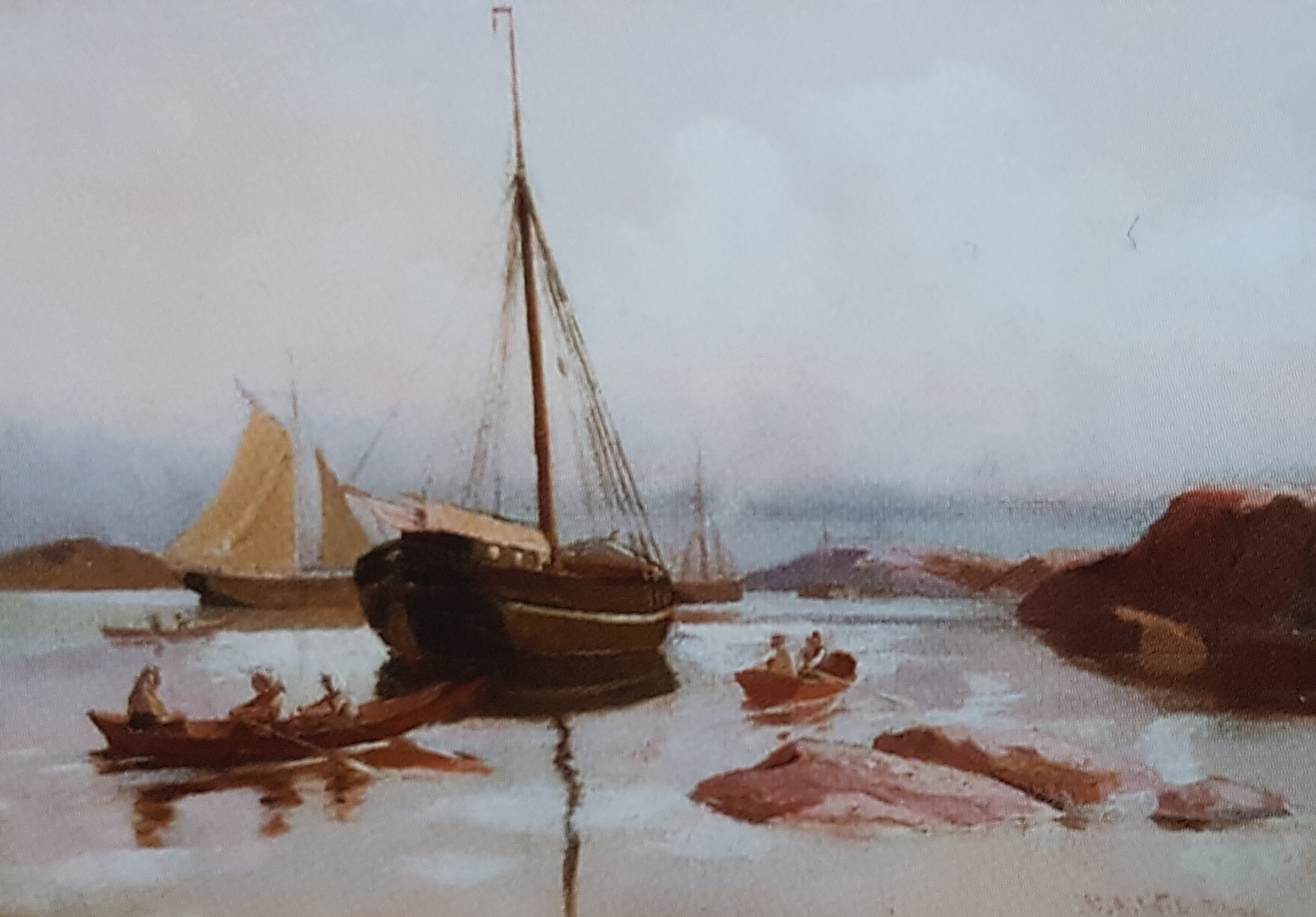

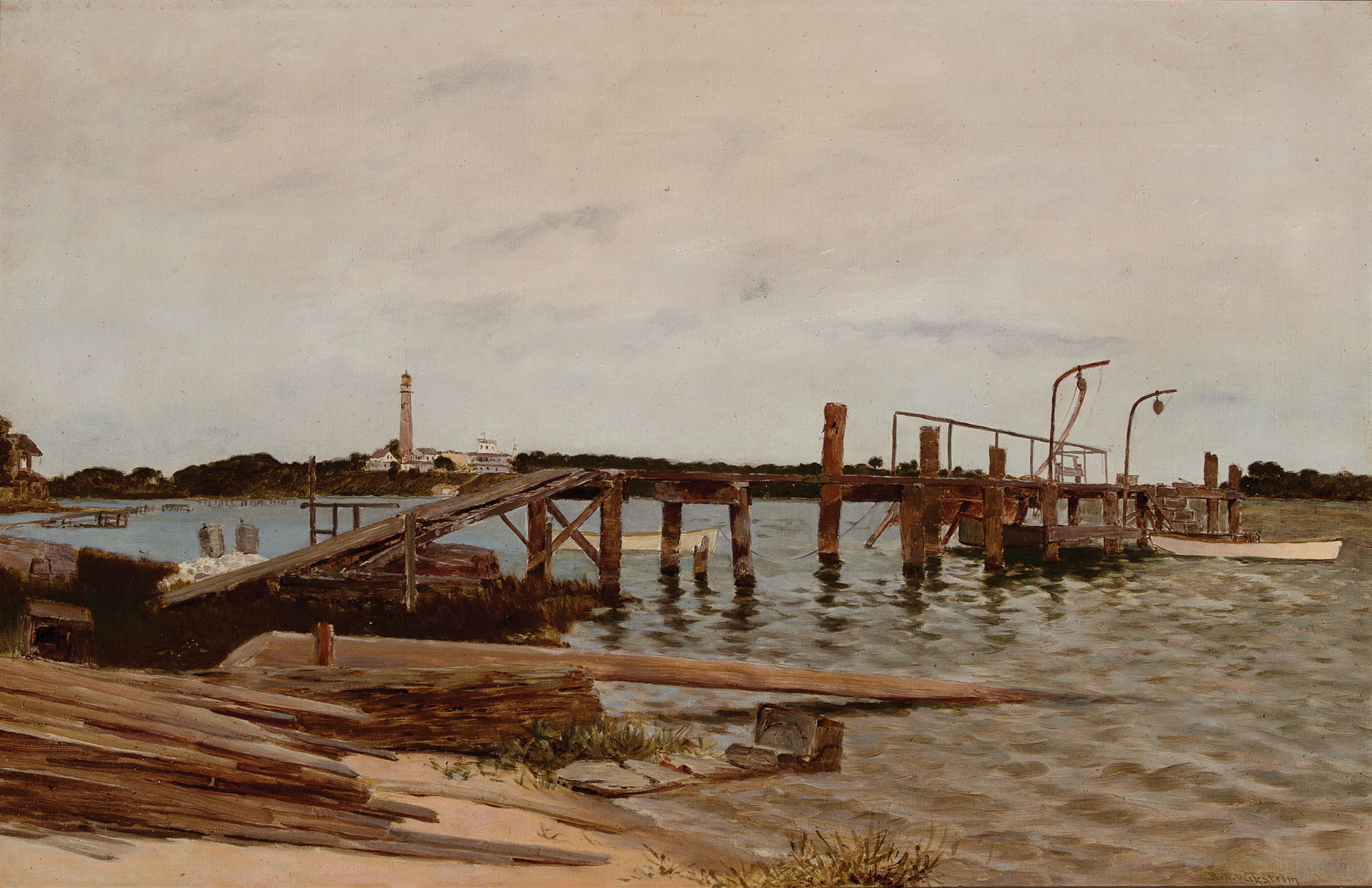

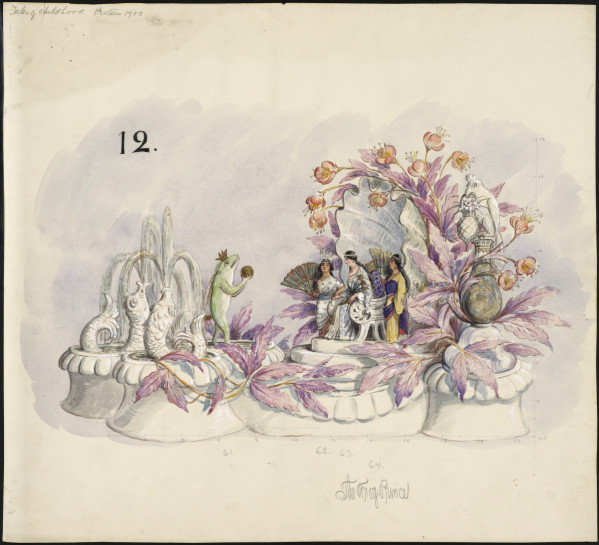

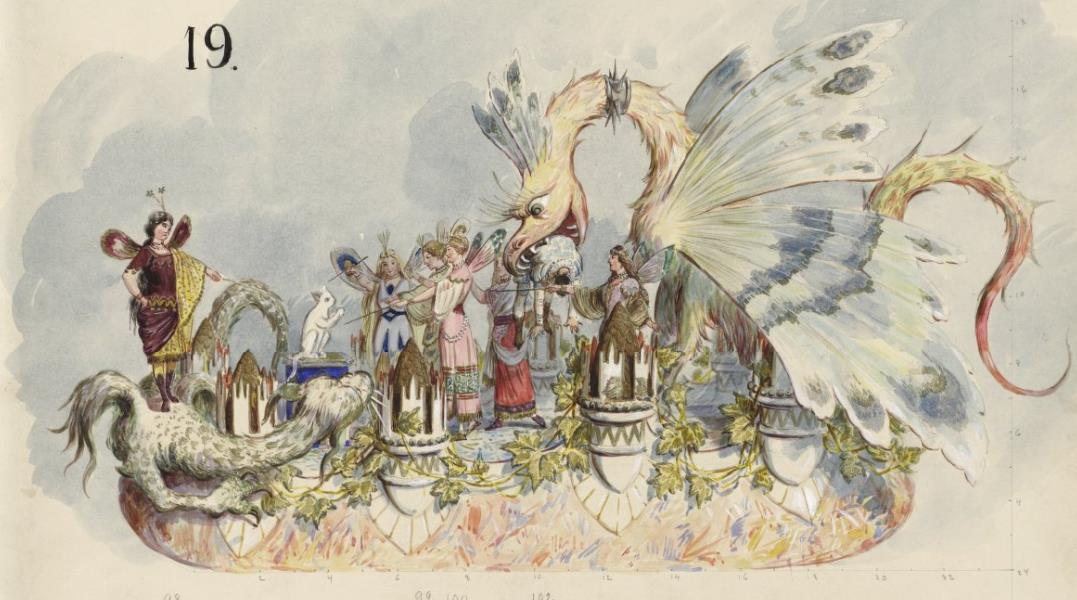

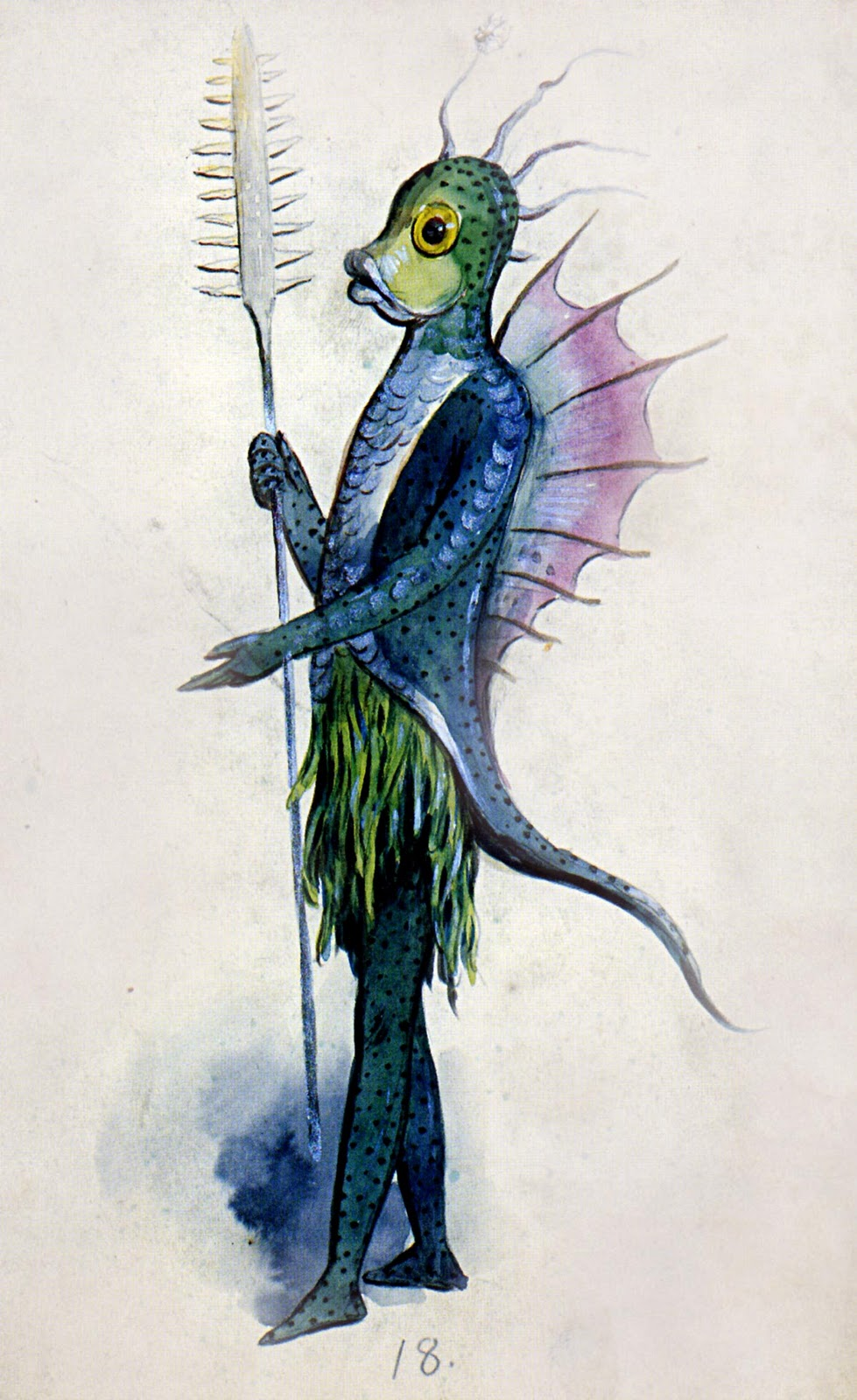

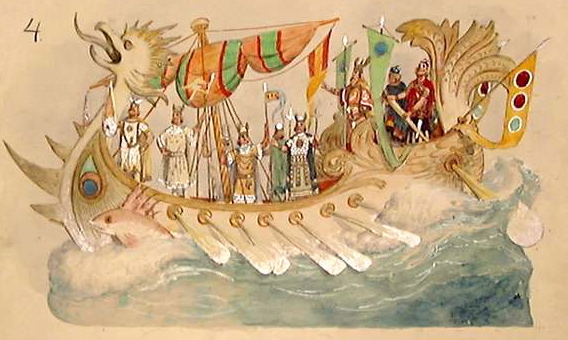
