= Krewe of Proteus =

Parade krewe at New Orleans Mardi Gras

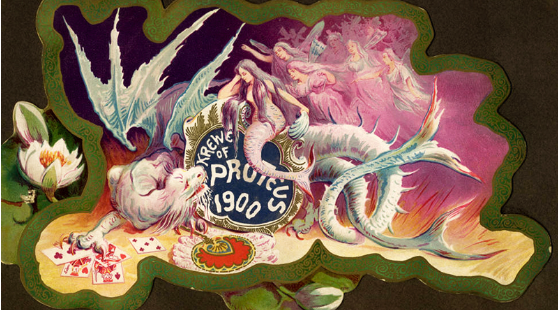
- Krewe of Proteus Invitation 1900
- Abbreviation: KoP
- Named after: Proteus
- Formation: 1882; 144 years ago
- Type: Carnival Krewe
- Location: New Orleans, LA.
- Website: kreweofproteus.com

The Krewe of Proteus (KoP) is a New Orleans Carnival Krewe founded in 1882, the oldest continuously parading Old Line Krewe.

== History and formation ==
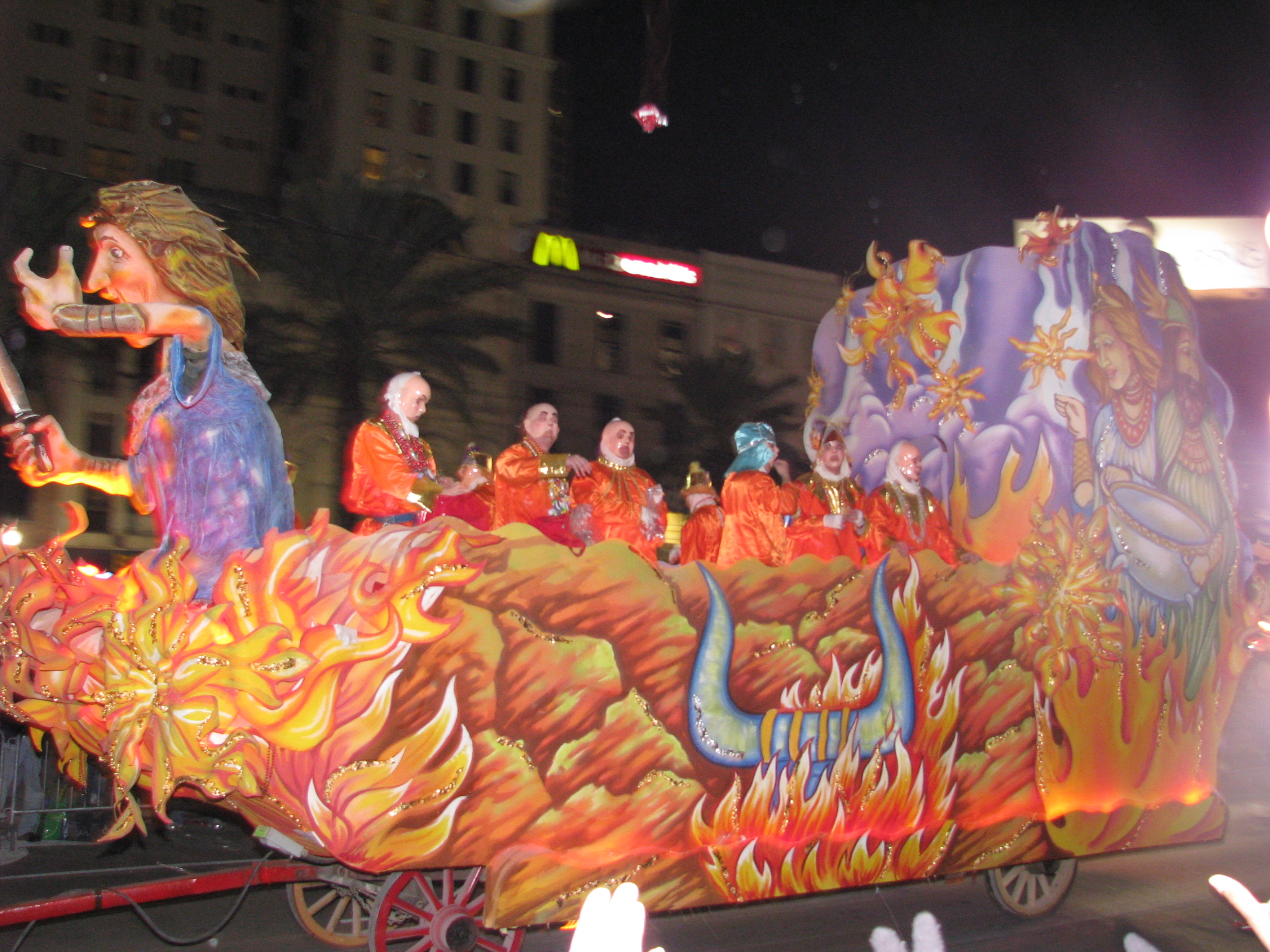
KREWE OF PROTEUS 2005

The Krewe of Proteus is the longest riding Old Line Night Parade Krewe in New Orleans Carnival after the Mistick Krewe and the Knights of Momus stopped parading in 1992. The parade of the krewe of Proteus traditionally travels an Uptown or St. Charles route ending on Canal Street. Parade floats still use original chassis from the early 1880s. Proteus is an offshoot of Mistick Krewe, and Knights of Momus - formed because the Mistick Krewe's waiting list was too long. Supposedly the Captain of the Mistick Krewe made the suggestion to form Proteus, as it was taking even too long for younger men of Comus families to get into Knights of Momus.

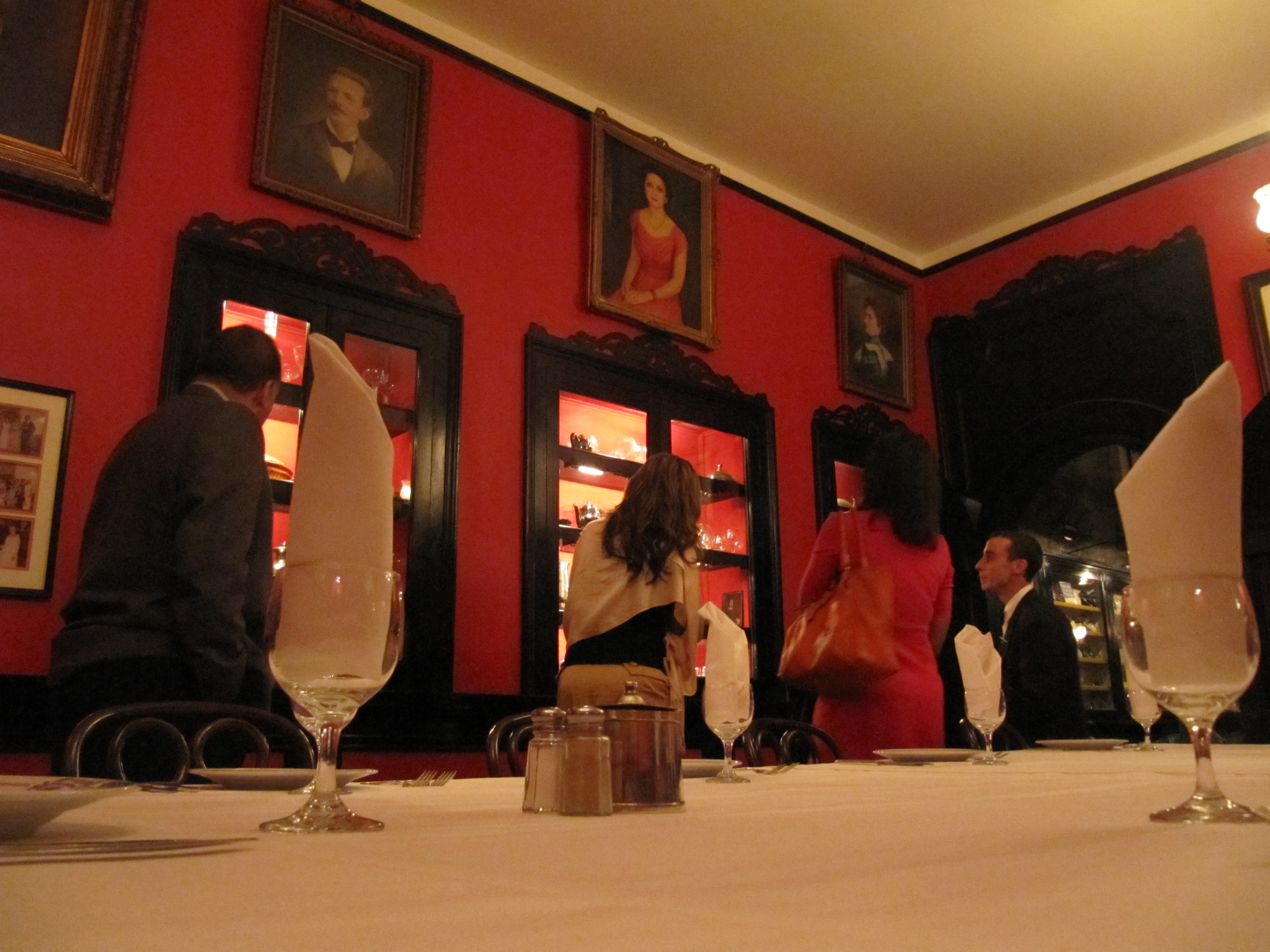
Antoine's the Proteus Dining Room

In 1991 the New Orleans City Council, led by Democrat Dorothy Mae Taylor, passed an ordinance that required social organizations, including Mardi Gras Krewes, to certify publicly that they did not discriminate on the basis of race, religion, gender, disability, or sexual orientation, in order to obtain parade permits and other public licensure. The Proteus organization (along with Momus and Comus, other 19th-century Krewes) withdrew from parading, rather than racially integrating. Two federal courts later decided that the ordinance was an unconstitutional infringement on First Amendment rights of free association and an unwarranted intrusion into the privacy of the groups subject to the ordinance. Proteus returned to parading in 2000.

== Parade ==
Krewe of Proteus parades on the evening of Lundi Gras prior to the Krewe of Orpheus. The parade follows the uptown route for parades starting at Napoleon Avenue and Magazine Street; proceed north to St. Charles; proceed east on St. Charles to Harmony Circle continuing on St. Charles to Canal Street. Krewe of Proteus utilize flambeaux to light the parade route.

=== Parade themes ===
The Krewe of Proteus keeps the season parade and ball theme secret until Lundi Gras.

- 2026 Journey of Sun Wukong
- 2025 Seafaring Scoundrels
- 2024 Commedia dell Arte
- 2023 Kālevālā Lore of Finland
- 2022 Divine Tricksters
- 2021 No Parade due to COVID-19
- 2020 Feasts and Libations
- 2019 Travels and Treasures of the Silk Road
- 2018 Les Grâces des dieux pour la Nouvelle-Orleans
- 2017 Der Ring Des Nibelungen
- 2016 The Hindu Heavens
- 2015 Nature of the Beasts
- 2014 Ancient Elements of Alchemy
- 2013 The Unseen New Orleans Carnival
- 2012 Mythologica Aquatica
- 2011 The Prophetic Old Man of the Sea
- 2010 The Mythology of Astrology
- 2009 Mabinogion: The Romance of Wales
- 2008 Realms of Enchantment
- 2007 Legends and Lore of the Deep
- 2006 Proteus Through the Years
- 2005 Fables Famous and Familiar
- 1999 No Parade
- 1998 No Parade
- 1997 No Parade
- 1996 No Parade
- 1995 No Parade
- 1994 No Parade
- 1993 No Parade
- 1988 Famous Firsts
- 1986 Notable Notes from New Orleans
- 1984 The Sun King
- 1983 Valentine Voyages
- 1982 Water Courses of the Continents
- 1981 Centennial Anniversary
- 1978 Creatures and Curious Cliches
- 1977 World in Our Garden
- 1967 Treasures of the Earth and Sea
- 1936 Don Quixote de la Mancha
- 1935 Irish Fairy Tales
- 1932 American Poet Lore
- 1929 The Adventures of Hajji Baba
- 1927 Famous Heroes and Heroines of History and Legend
- 1926 The Fair God
- 1925 Tales and Romance of Old Japan
- 1924 Netar-Tua
- 1923 Myths and Legends of North American Indians
- 1922 The Romance of the Rose
- 1907 The Queen of Serpents
- 1905 The Rubiyat
- 1904 The Alphabet
- 1903 Cleopatra
- 1902 Flora's Feast
- 1901 Al-Kyris the Magnificent
- 1900 Tales of Childhood
- 1899 E. Pluribus Unum
- 1898 A Trip to Wonderland
- 1897 Orlando Furioso
- 1896 Dumb Society
- 1895 Asgard and the Gods
- 1894 Sháh Námeh, The Epic of the Kings
- 1893 Kalevala
- 1892 A Dream of the Vegetable Kingdom
- 1891 Tales of the Genii
- 1889 The Hindoo Heavens
- 1888 Legends of the Middle Ages
- 1887 Andersen's Fairy Tales
- 1886 Visions of Other Worlds
- 1885 Myths and Worships of China
- 1884 The Aeneid
- 1882 Ancient Egyptian Mythology

== Gallery ==
=== Floats and costumes ===
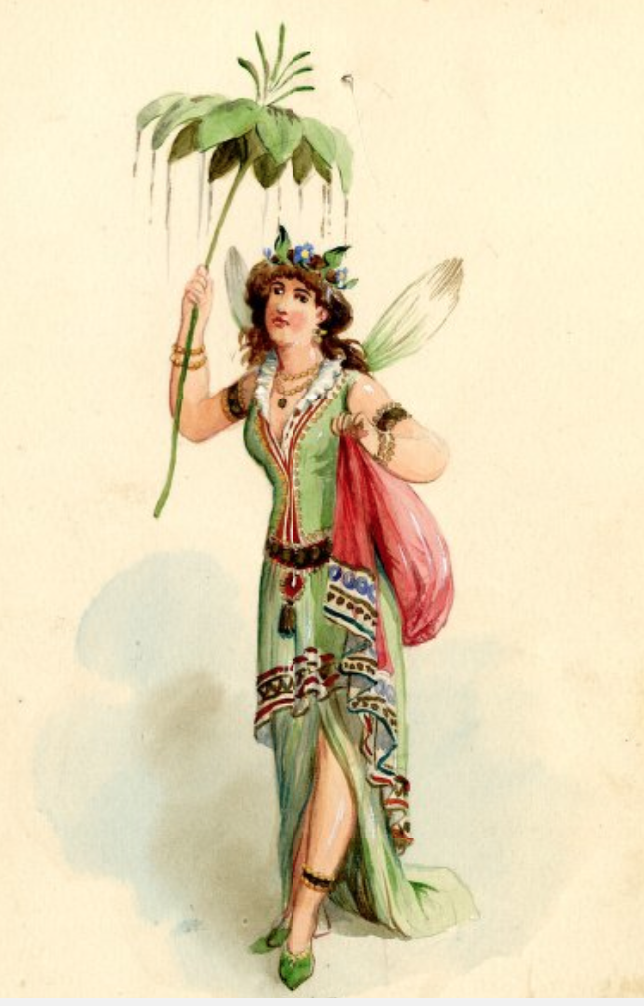
Elfland 1890

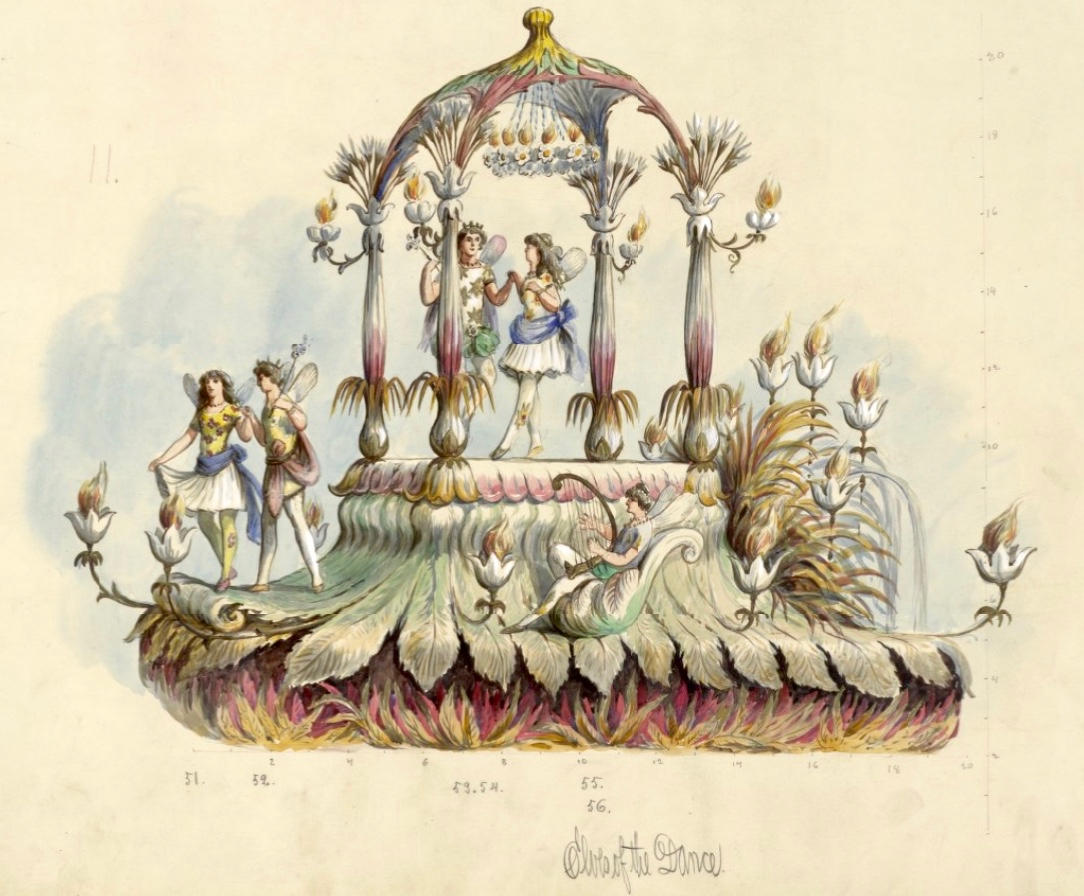
Elves of Dance 1890

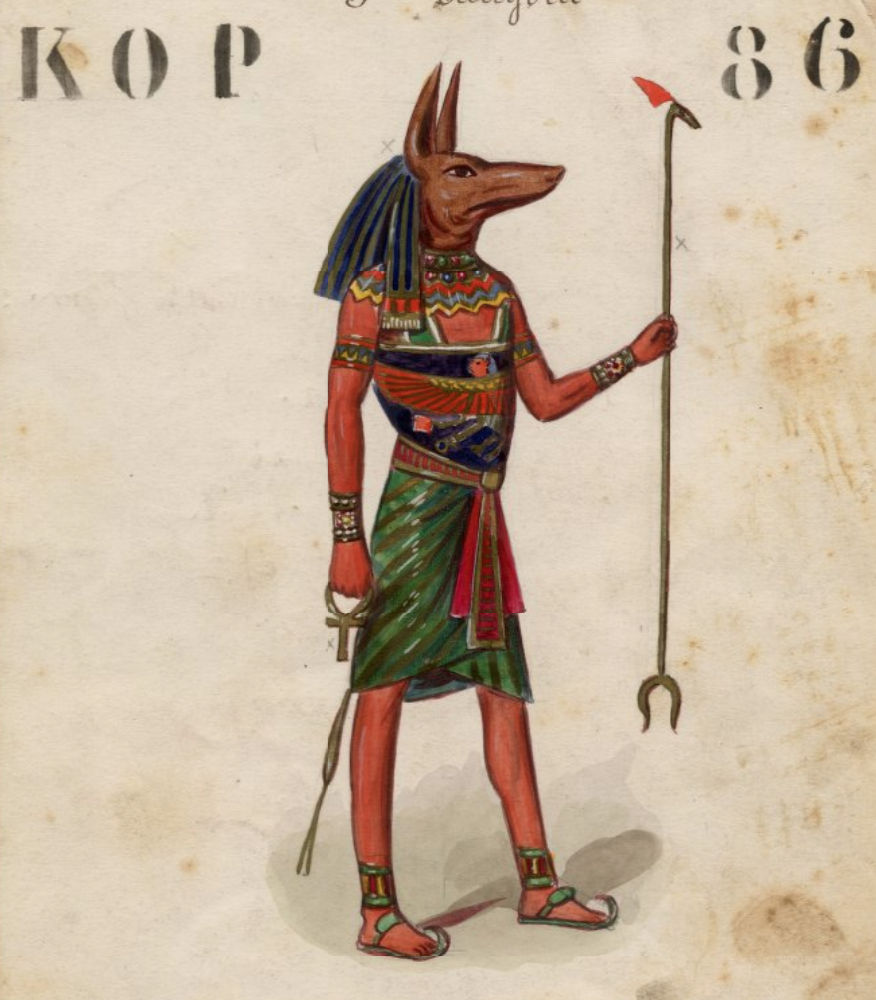
Anubis 1882

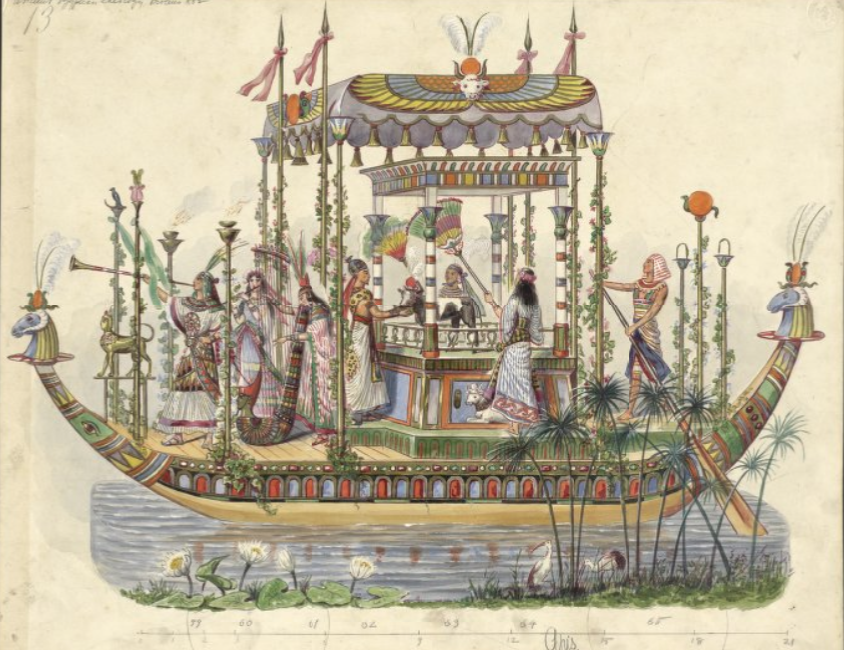
Apis 1882

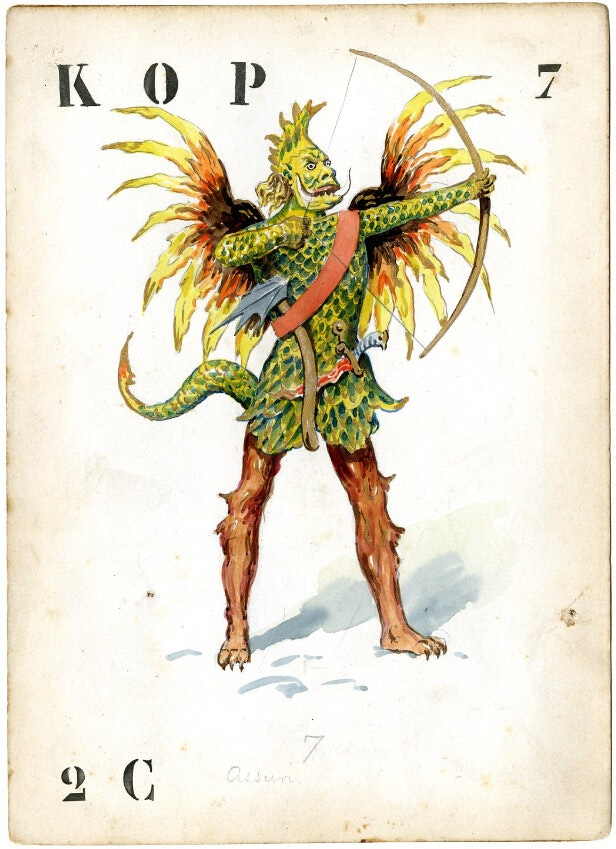
Assuri 1885

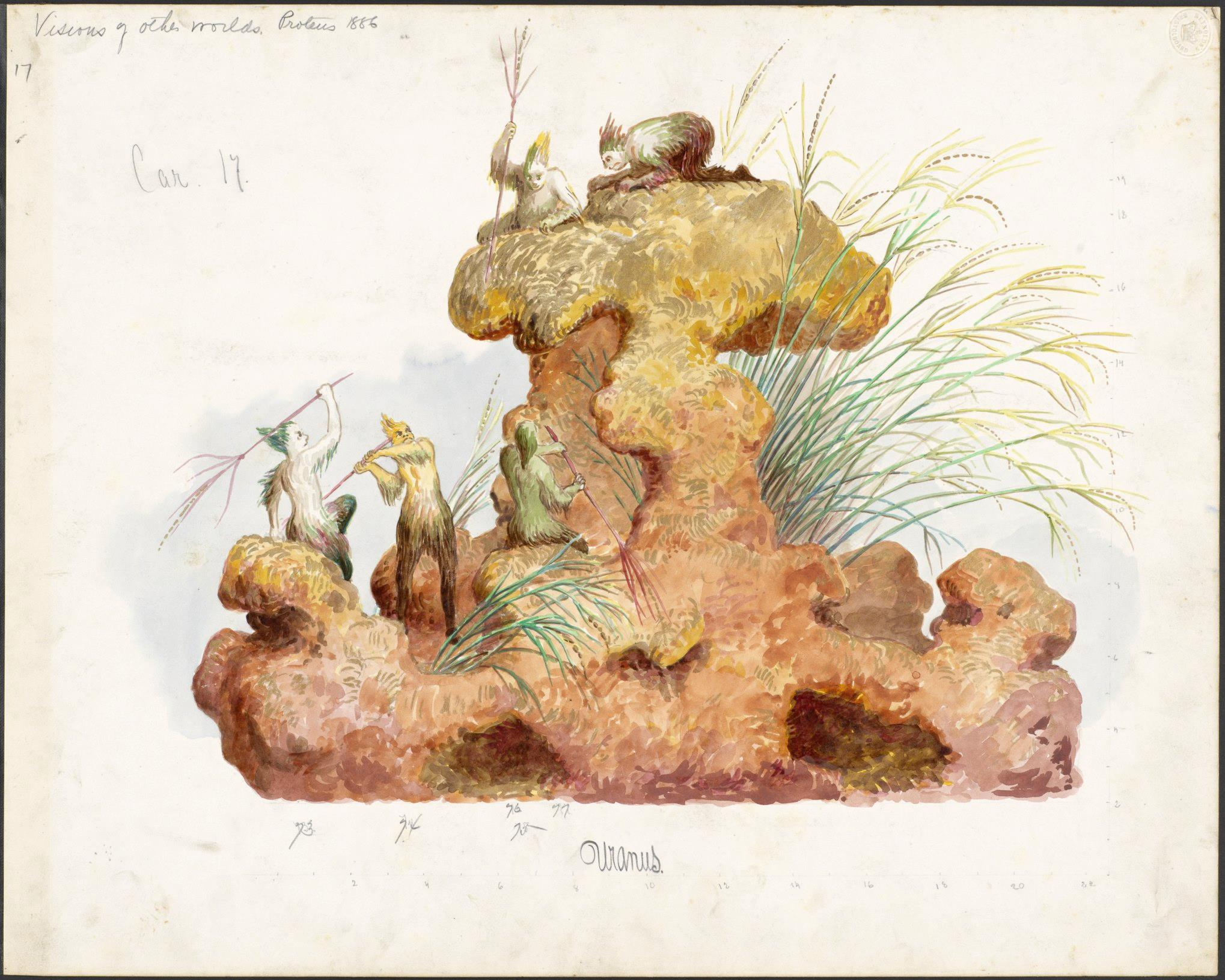
Uranus 1886

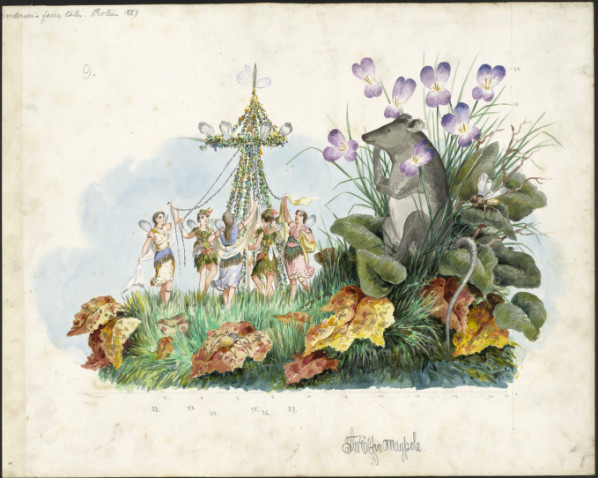
May Pole 1887

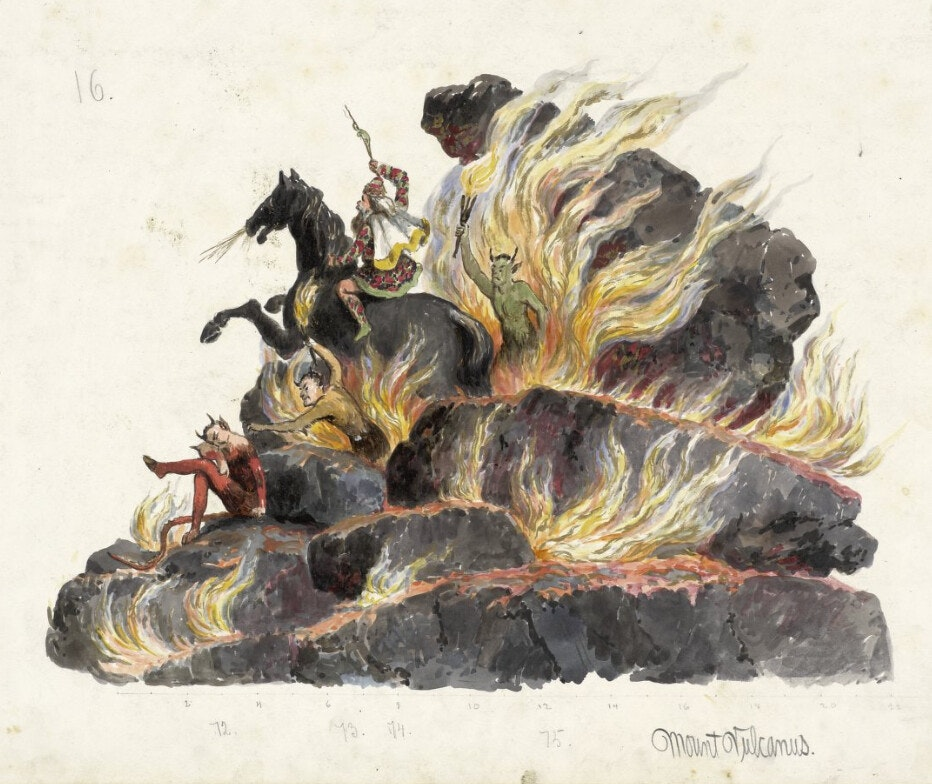
Bayard escapes from Mount Vulcanus 1888

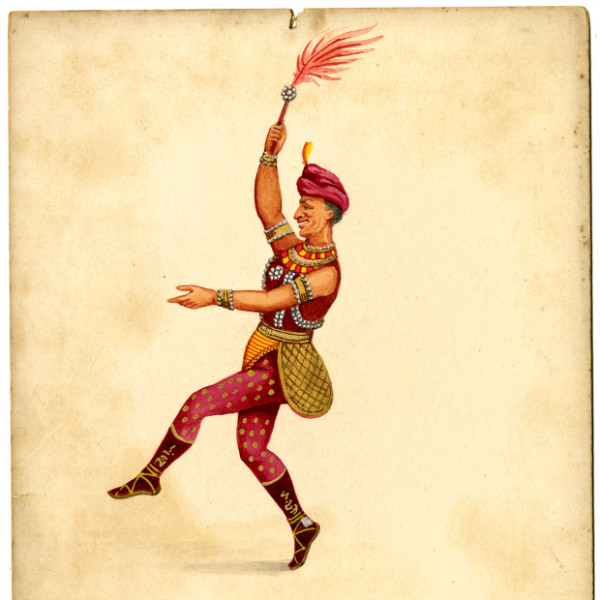
Fire Sprite 1889

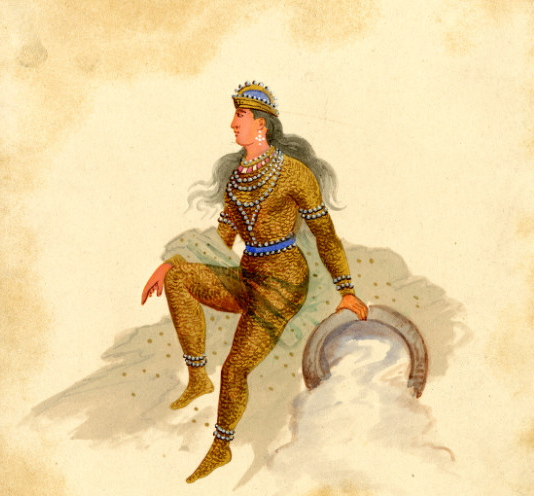
Water Nymph 1889

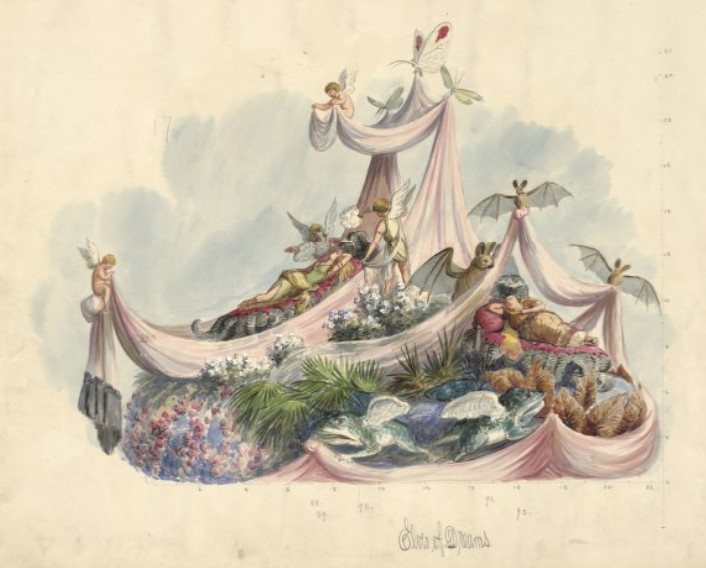
Elves of Dreams 1890

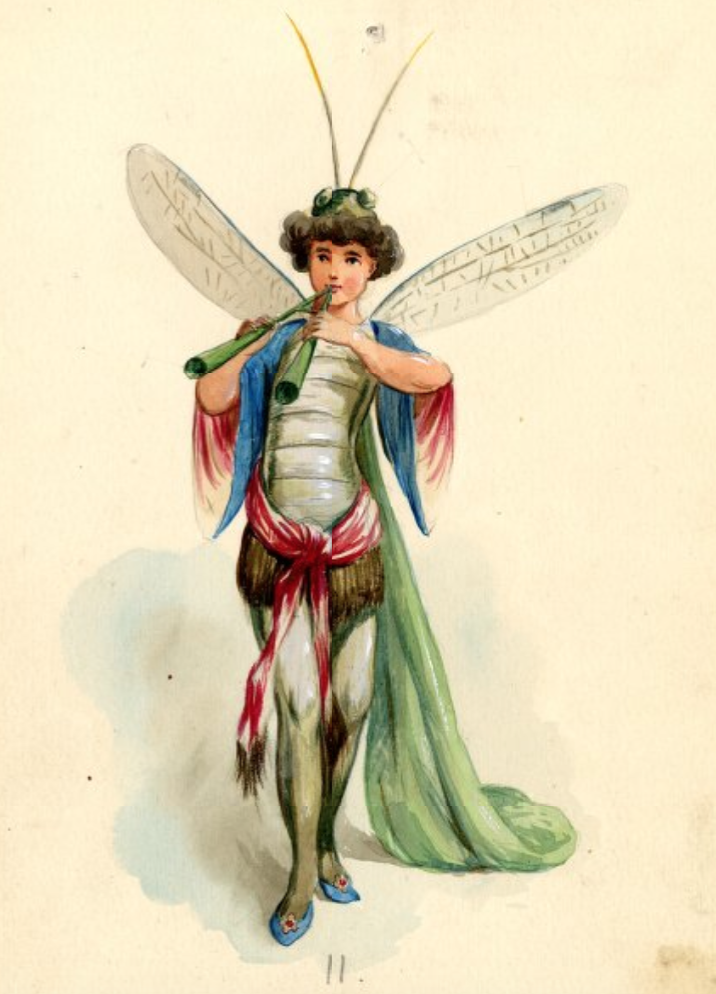
Elfland 1890

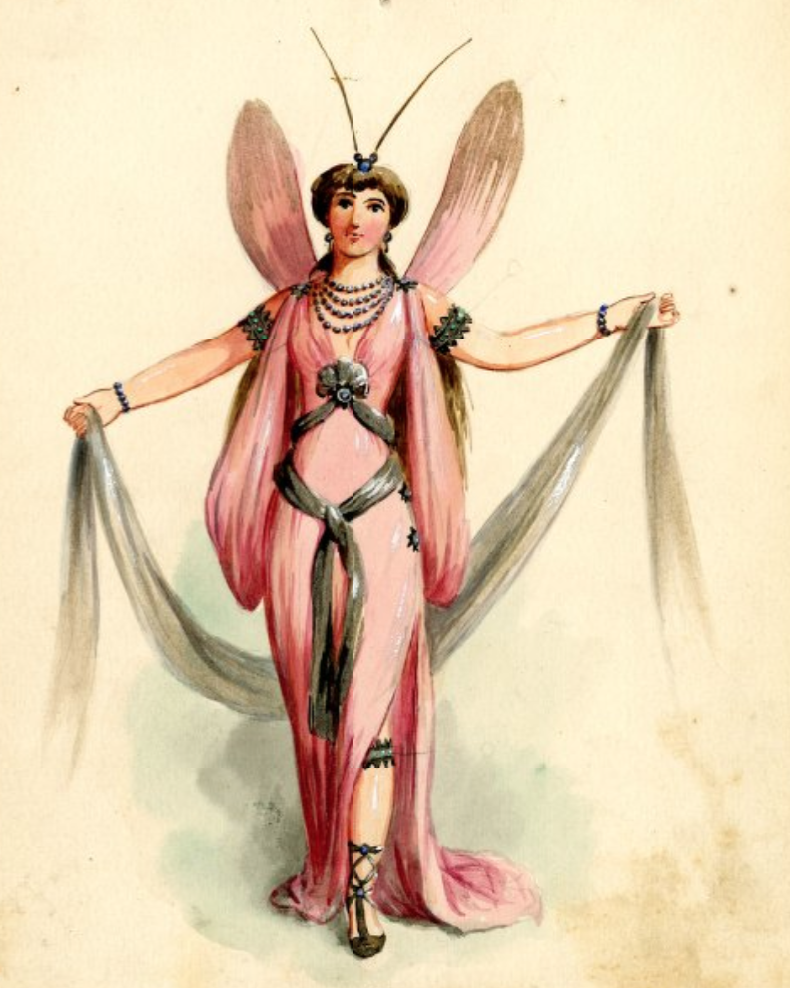
Pink Butterfly Elf 1890

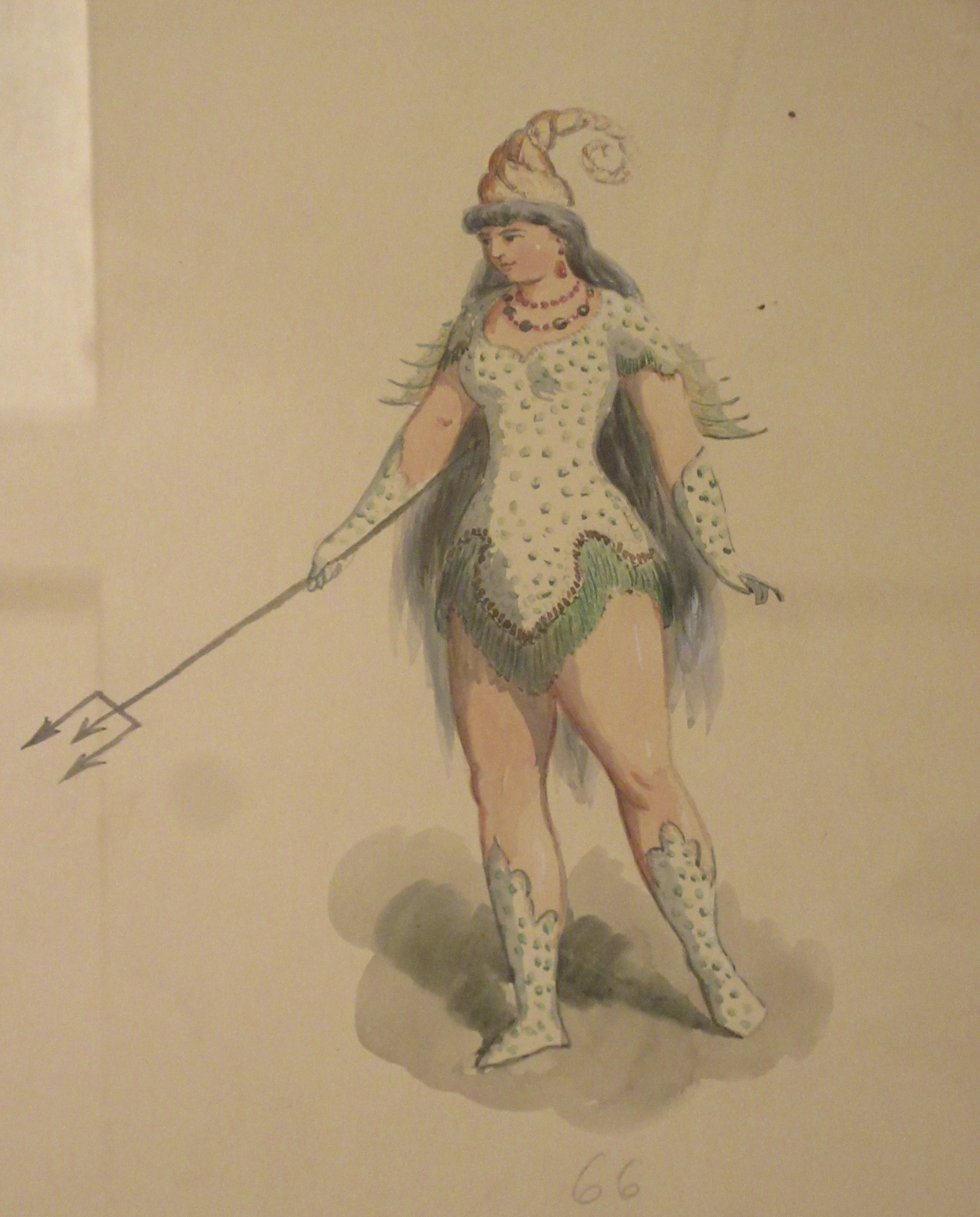
1892

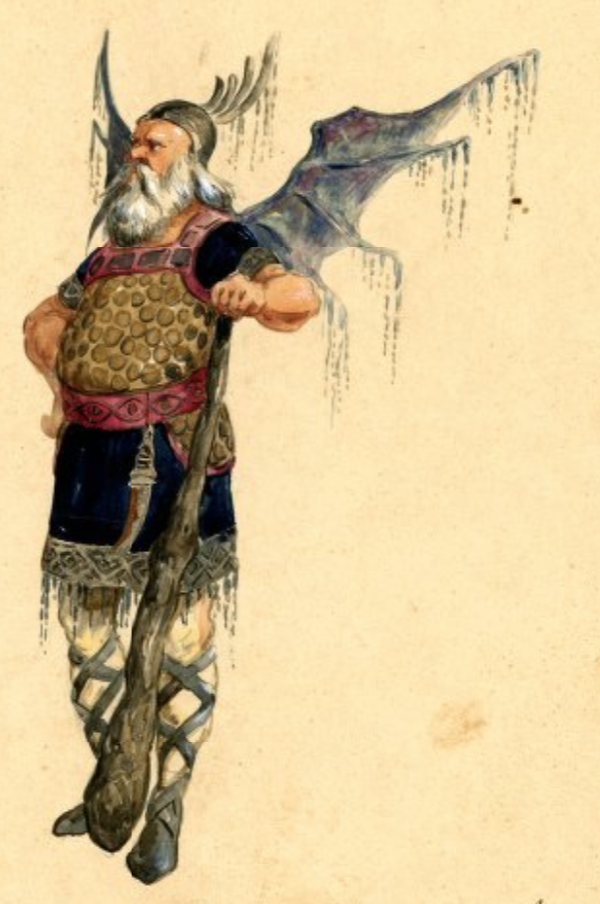
Aarini, God of Hidden Treasures 1893

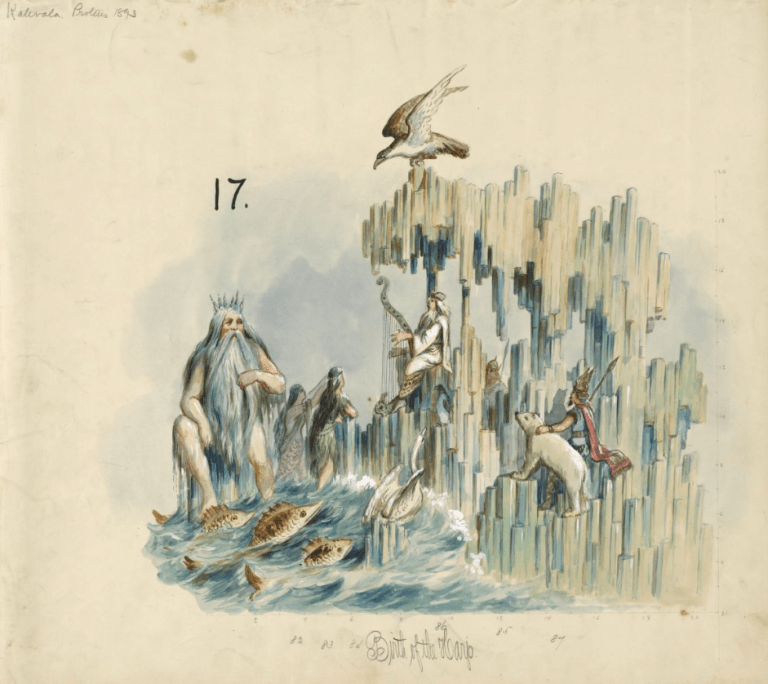
Birth of the harp Wainamoinen wisdom singer 1893

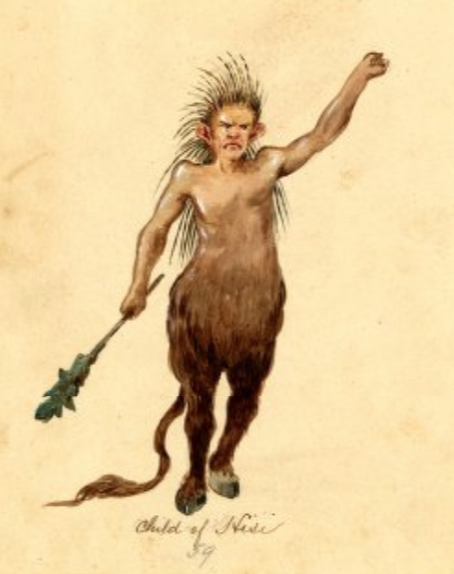
Child of Hisi 1893

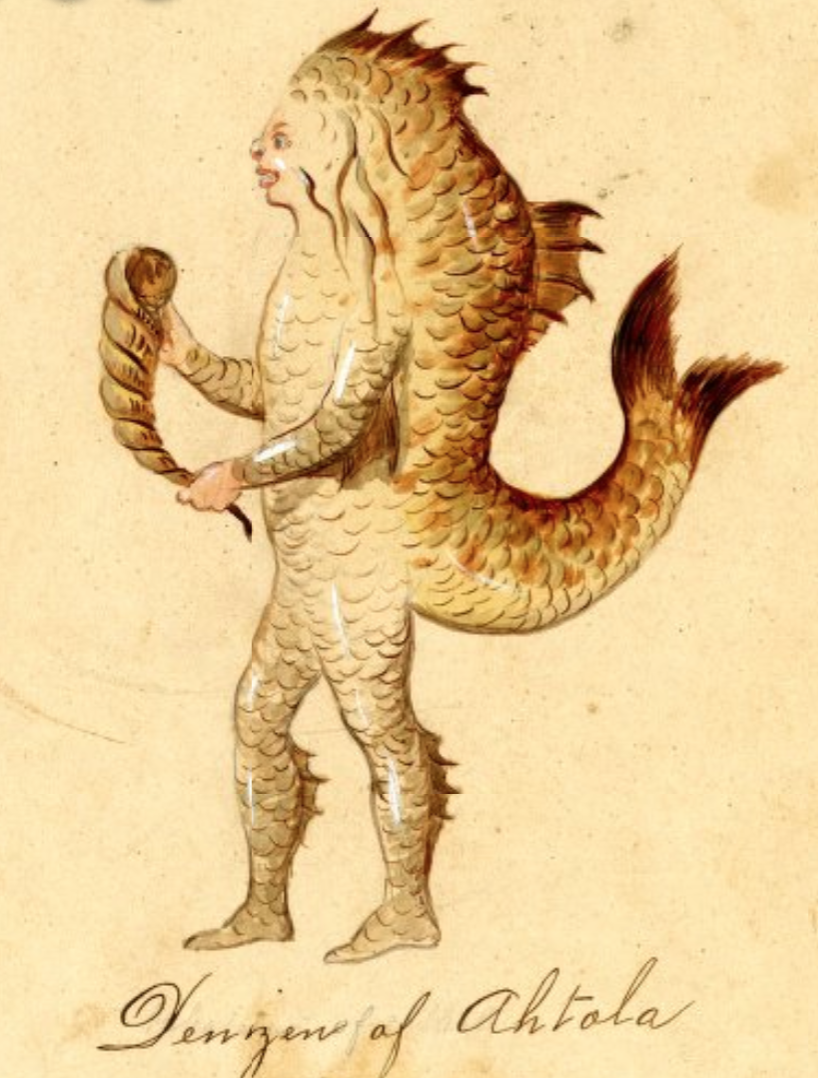
Denizen of Ahtola 1893

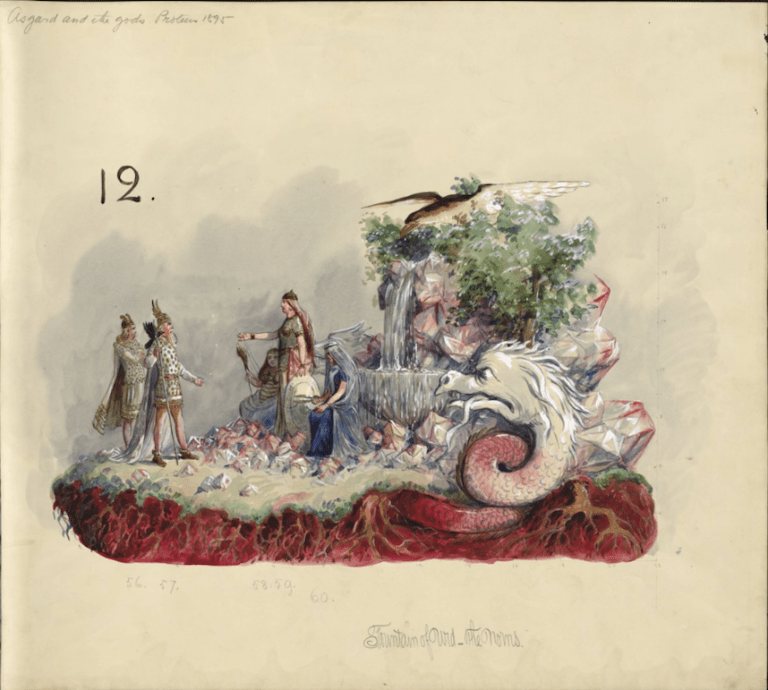
Fountain of Urd The Norns 1895

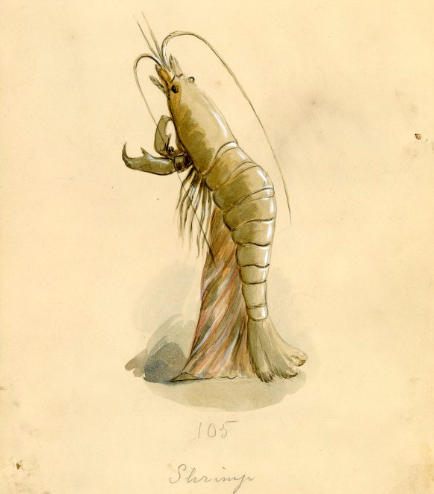
Shrimp 1896

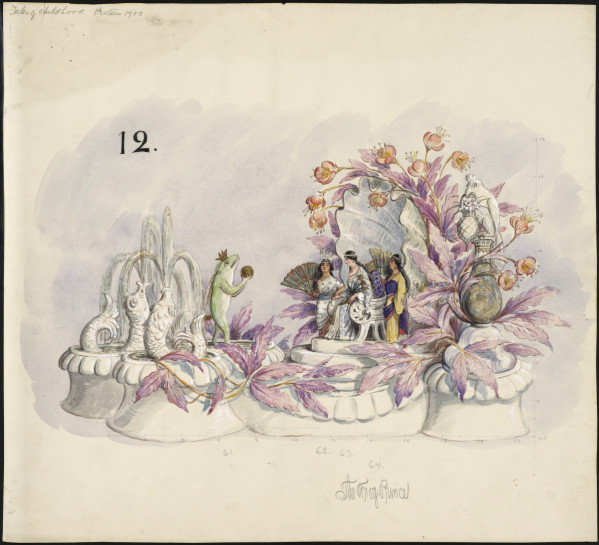
Frog Prince 1900

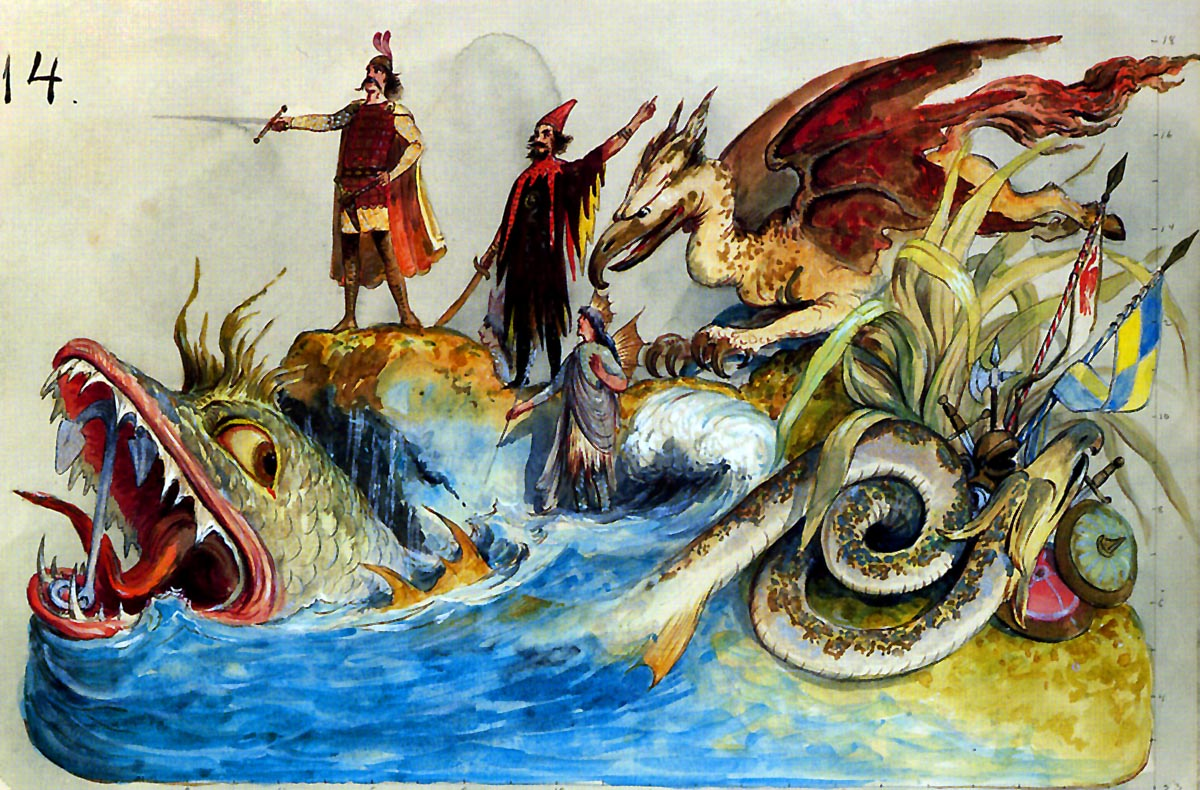
Wikstorm 1906

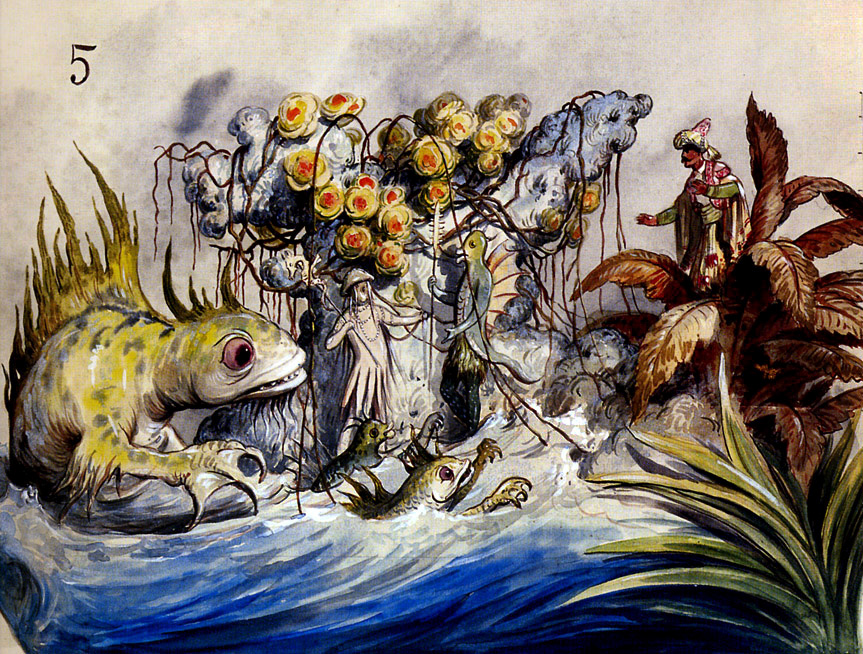
Wikstorm Monsters 1907

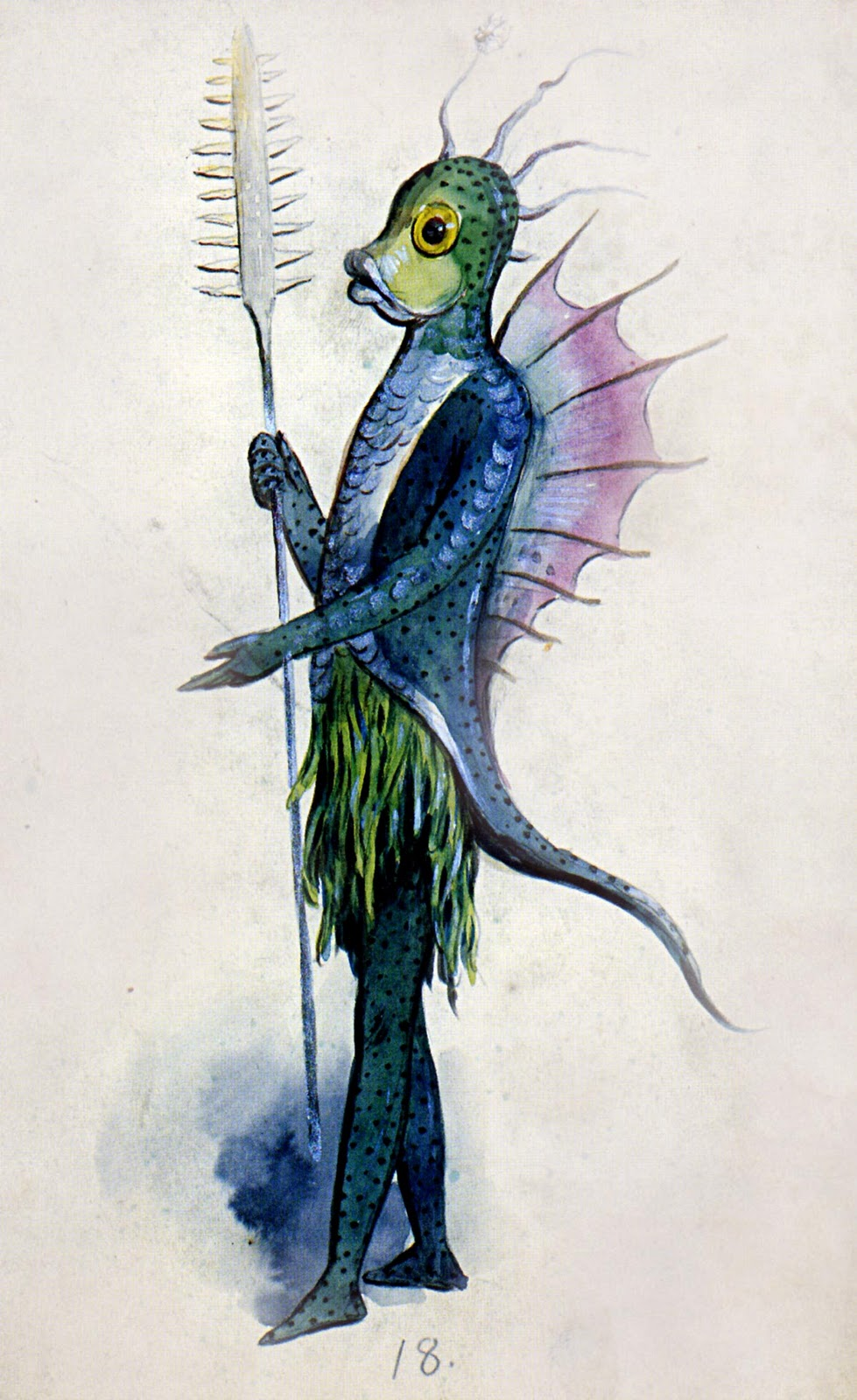
Fishman Costume 1907

=== Invitation ===
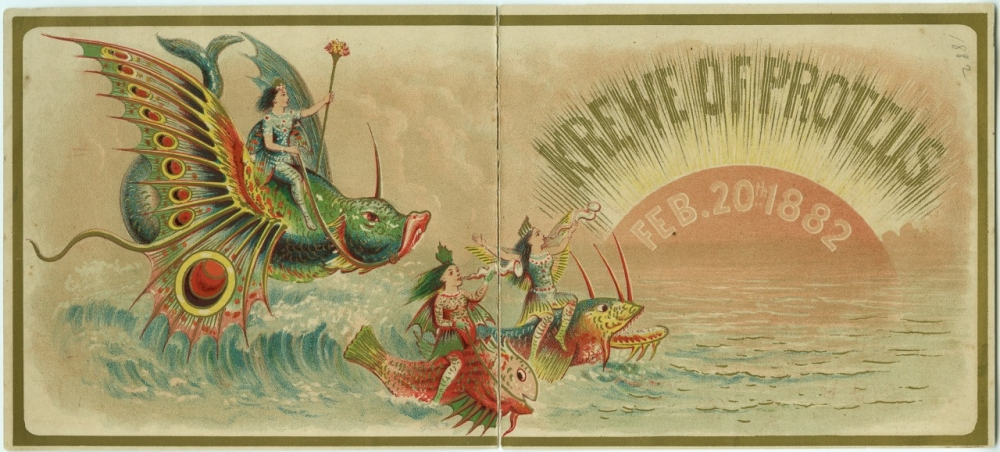
1882

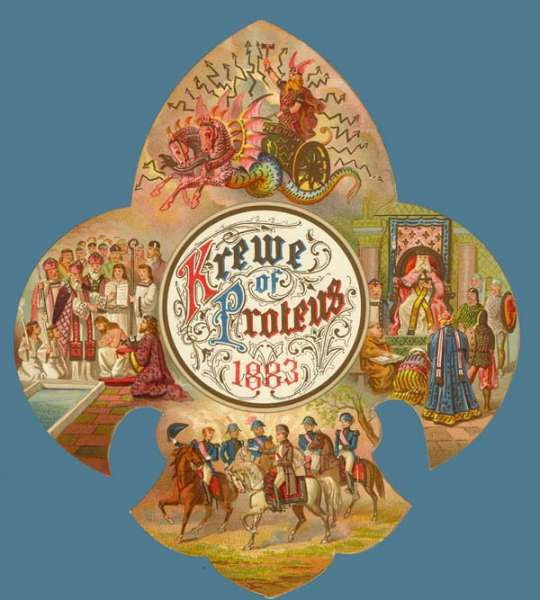
1883

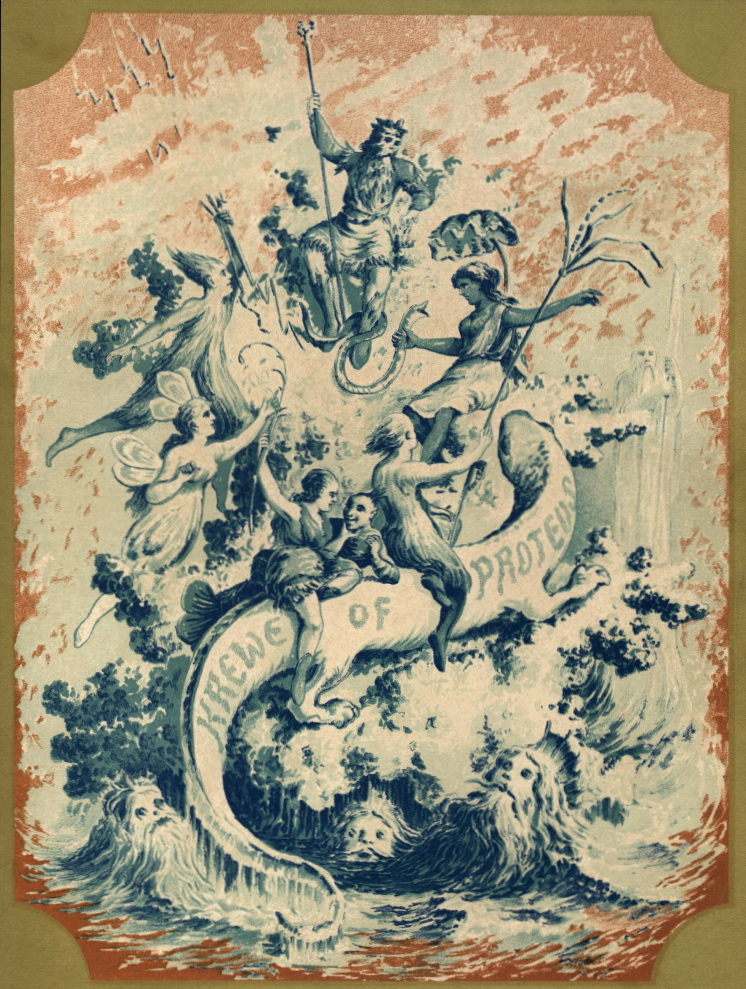
1886

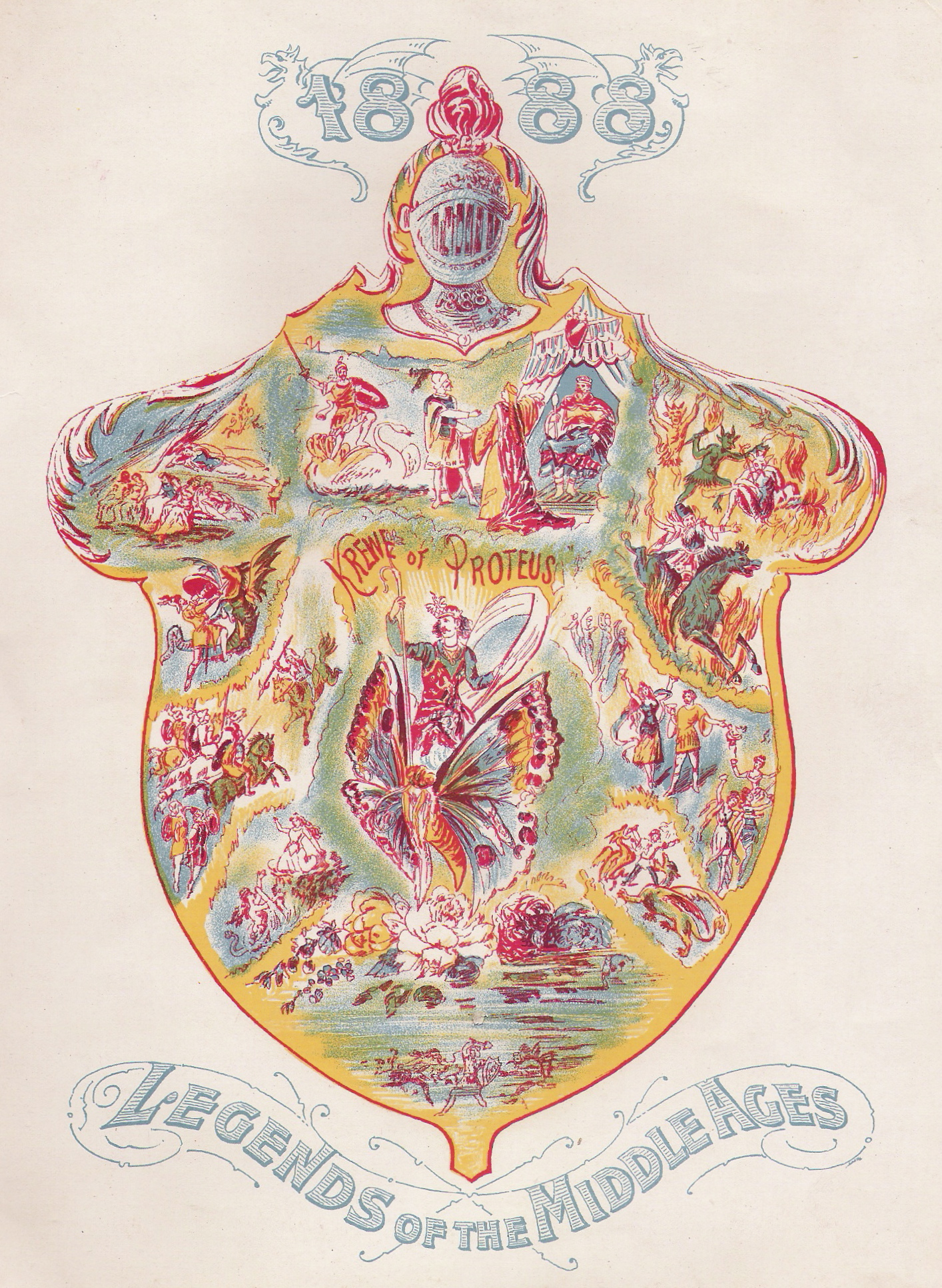
1888

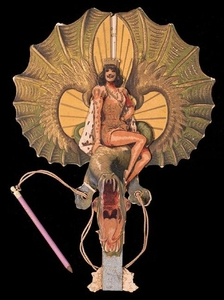
Dance Card 1891

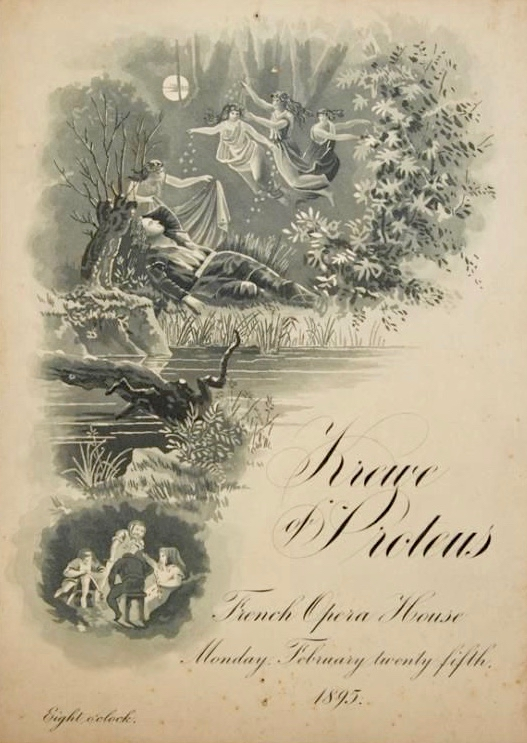
1895

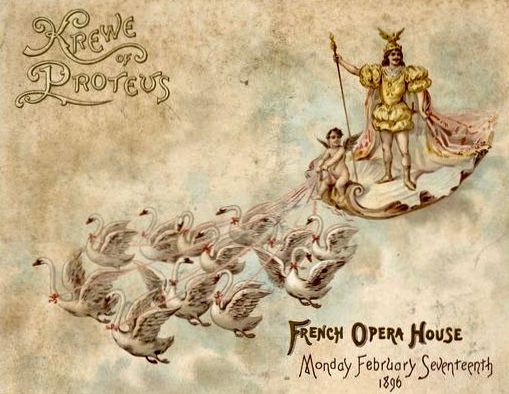
1896

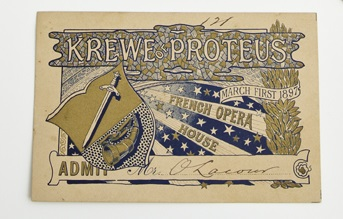
1897 Admittance Card

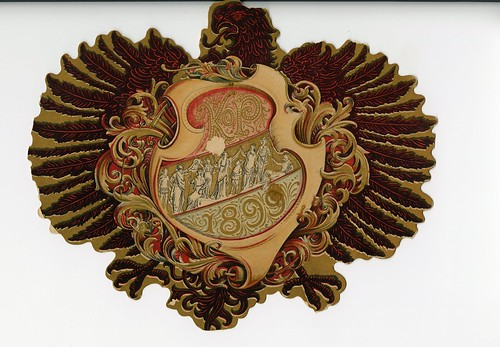
1899 side 1

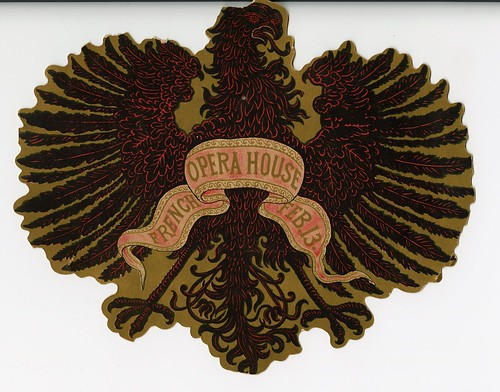
1899 side 2

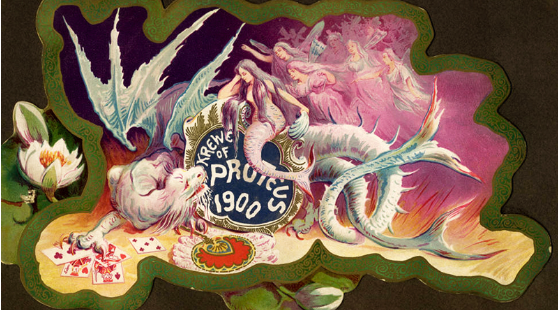
Krewe of Proteus Invitation 1900

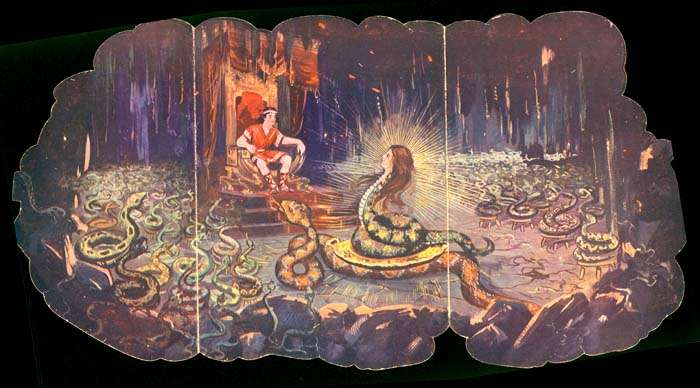
1907

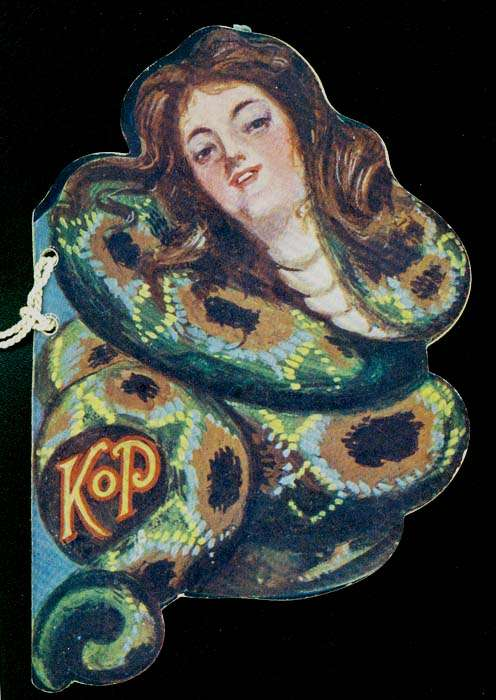
1907 Dance Card

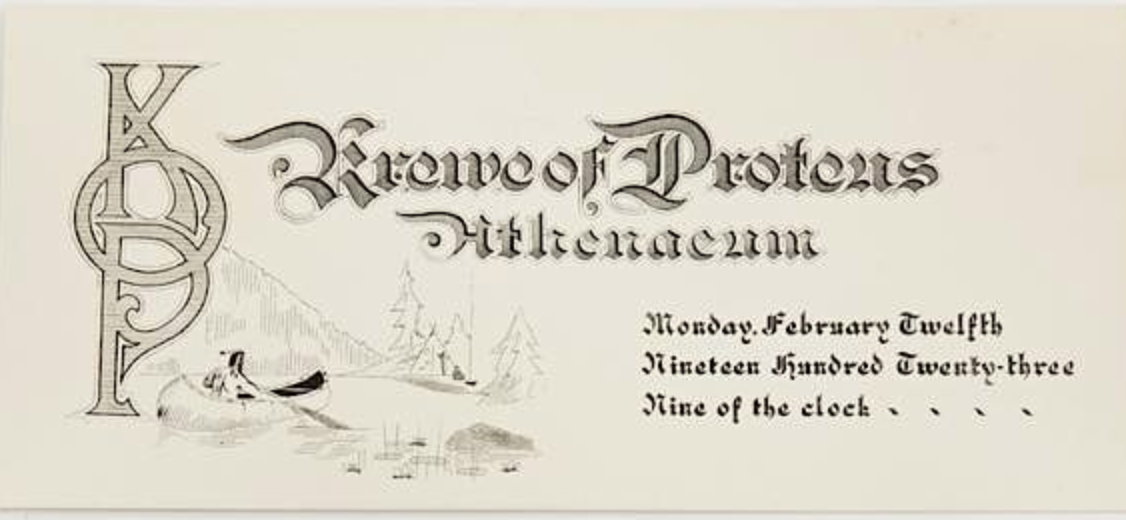
1923

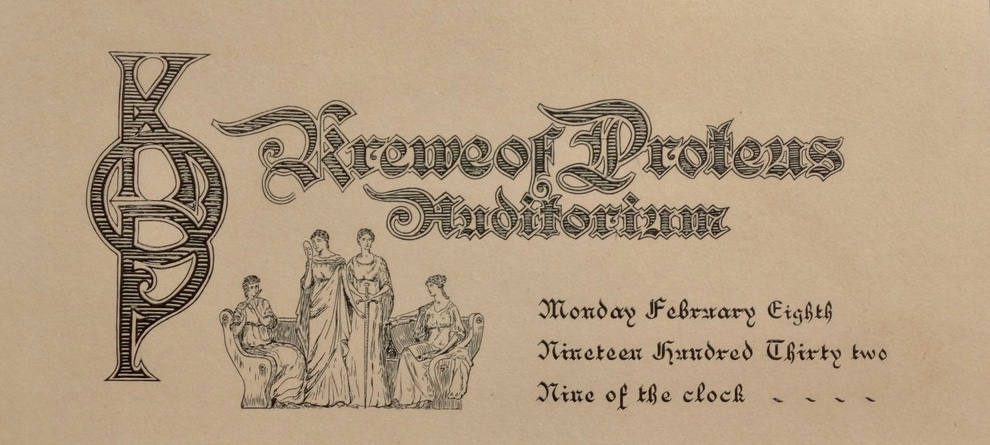
1932

=== Bulletin ===
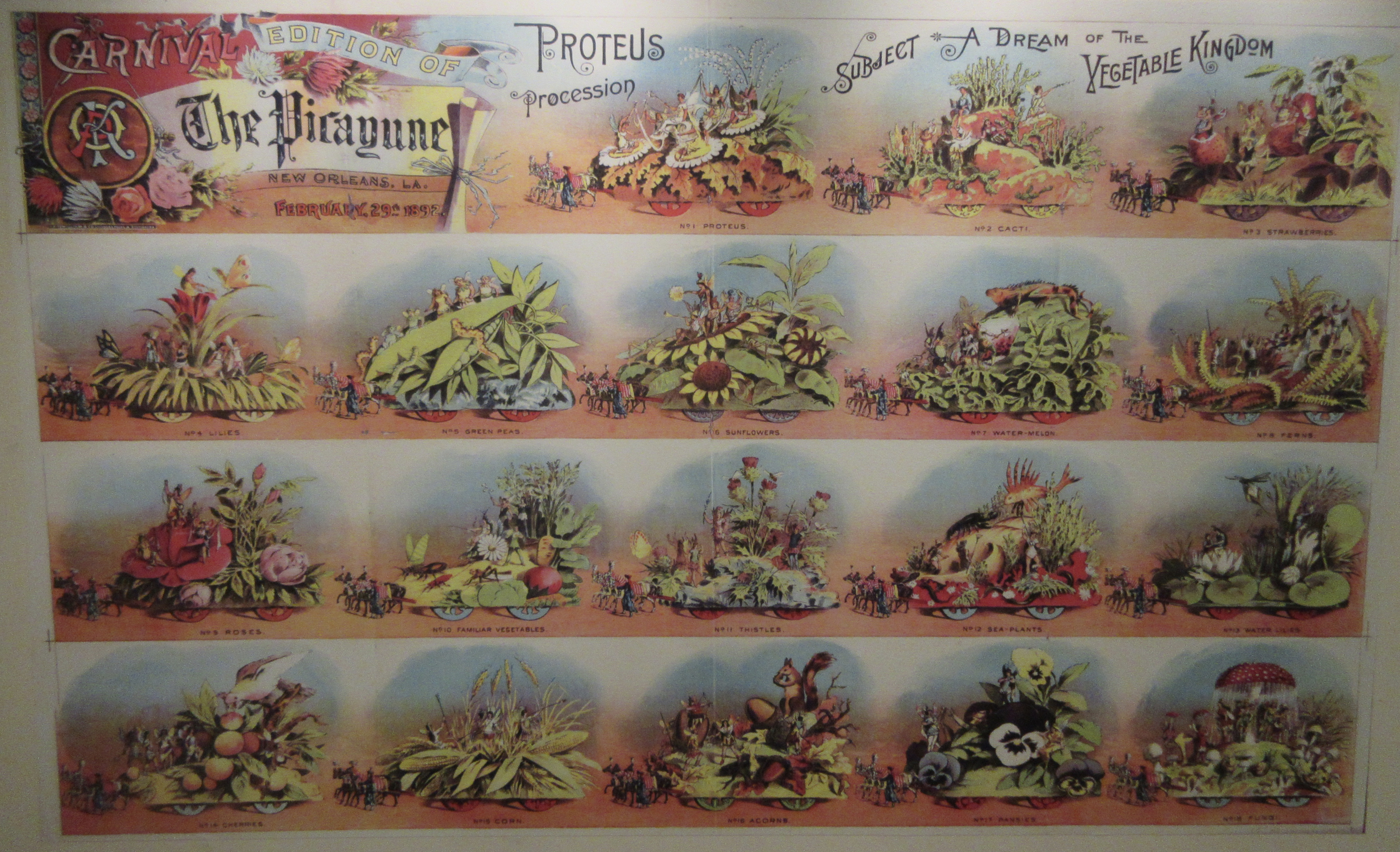
A Dream of the Vegetable King 1892

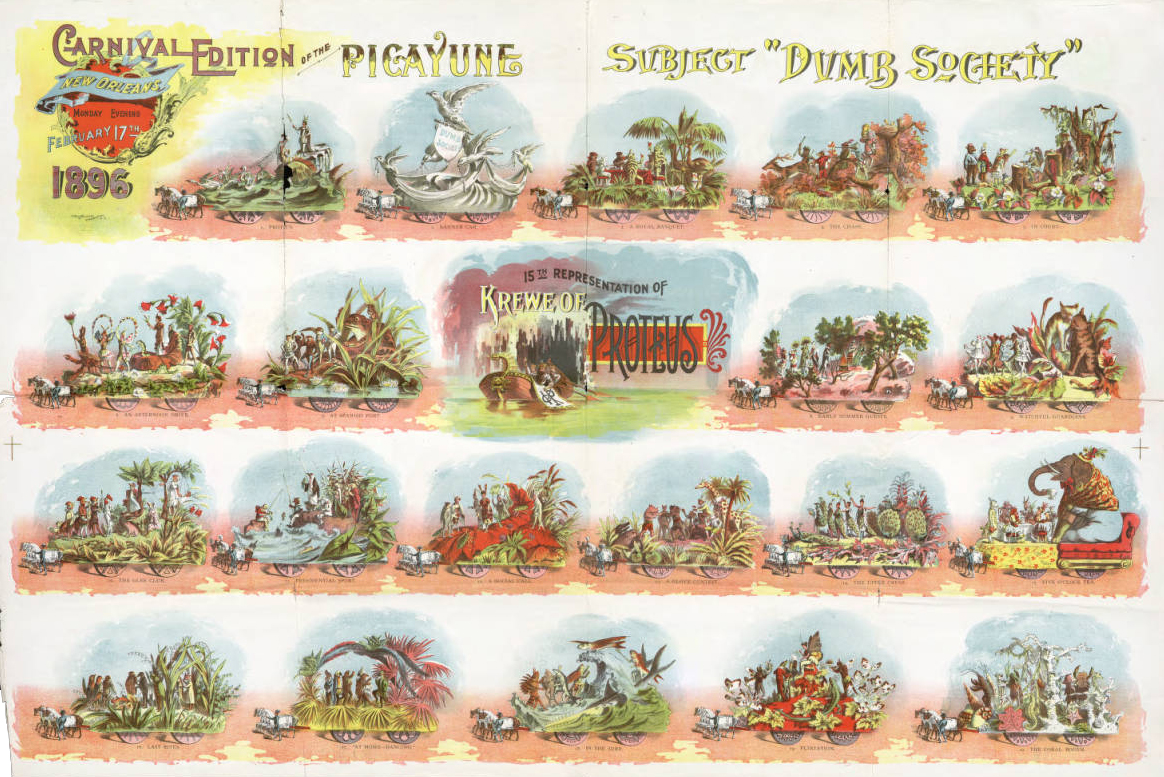
Dumb Society 1896

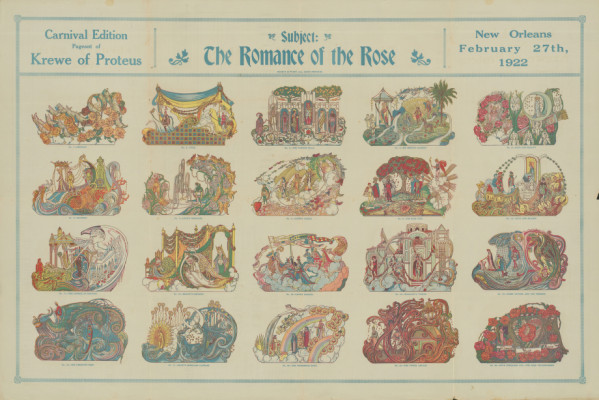
The Romance of the Rose 1922

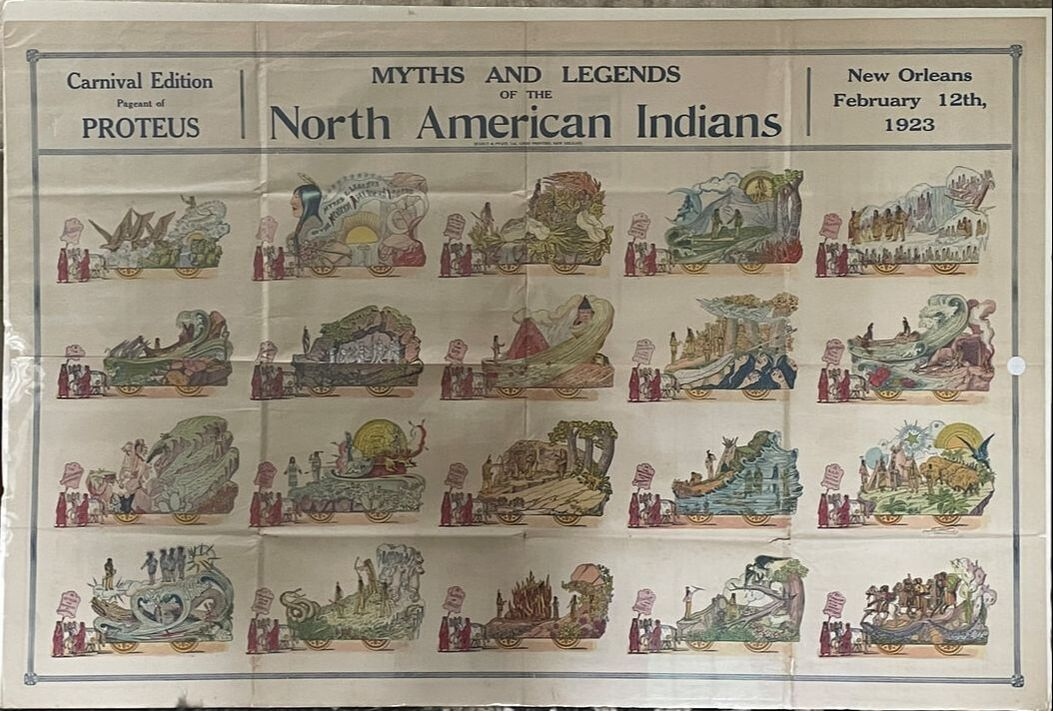
Myth & Legends of North American Indians 1923

=== Program ===
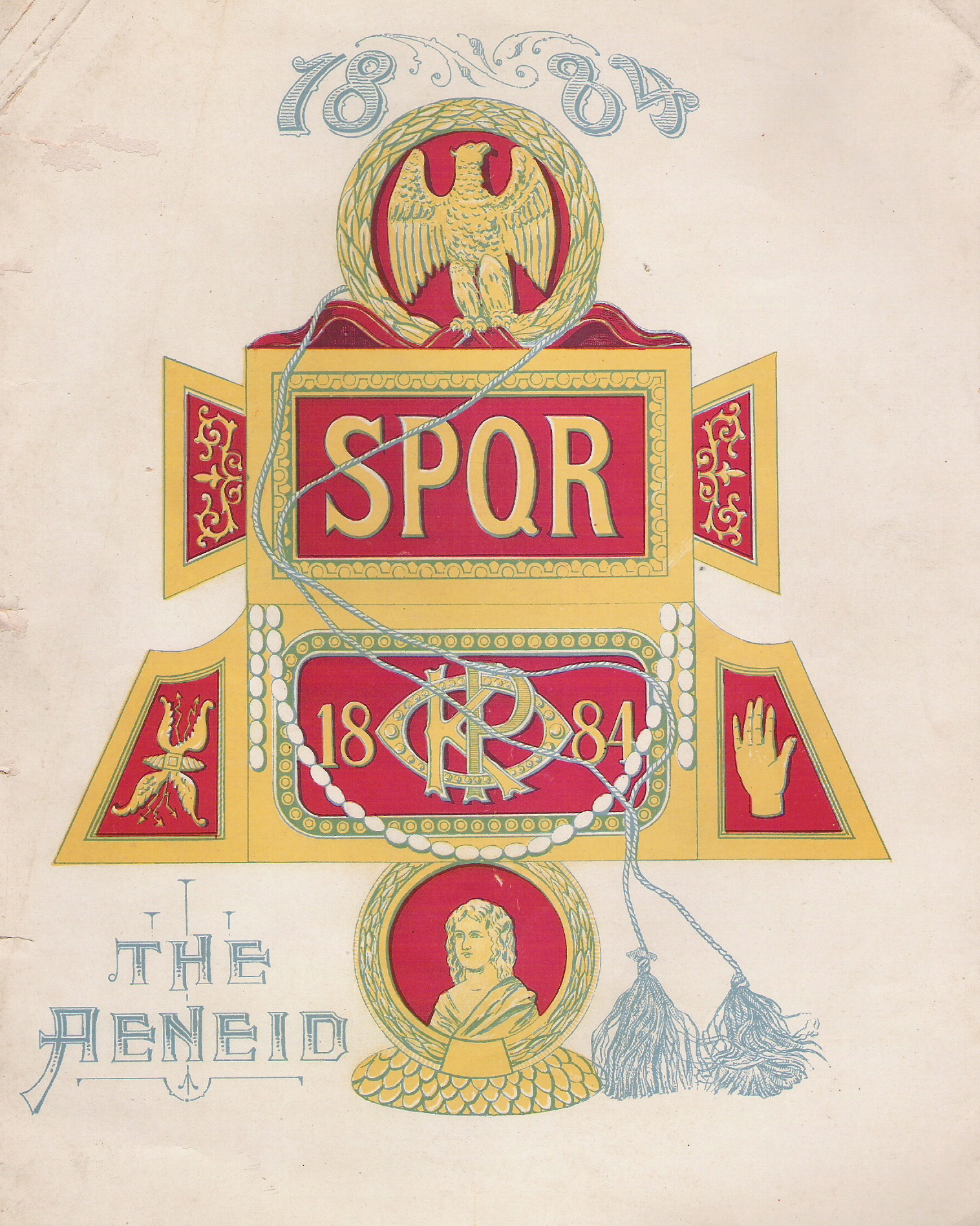
1884

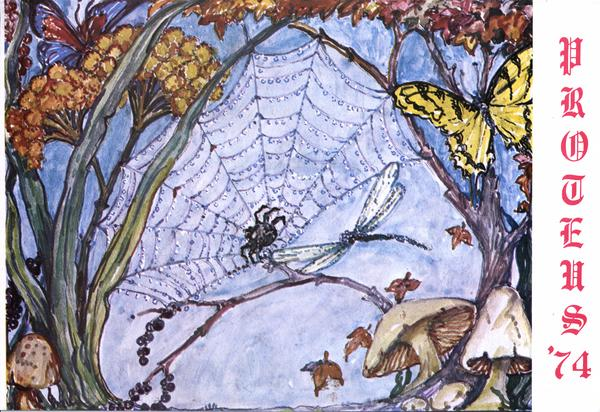
1974

== See also ==
- Knights of Momus
- Mistick Krewe
- Twelfth Night Revelers
- The Boston Club
