= Marie Madeleine Seebold Molinary =

American painter

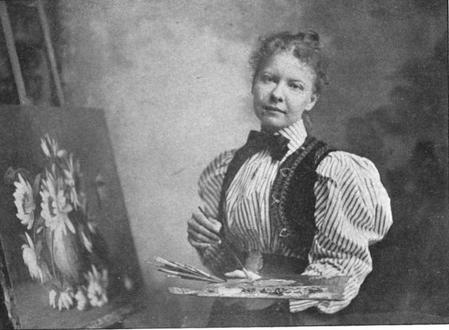
- Born: Marie Madeleine Seebold; August 13, 1866; New Orleans, Louisiana
- Died: August 19, 1948 (aged 83); New Orleans, Louisiana
- Known for: Painting
- Spouse: Andres Molinary (m. 1915)

Marie Madeleine Seebold Molinary (1866–1948) was an American painter known for her still life paintings and landscapes.

== Biography ==
Molinary née Seebold was born on August 13, 1866, in New Orleans, Louisiana. She was the daughter of Frederic William Seebold, an art collector in New Orleans. She was encouraged by her family in her study of art. She studied with George David Coulon and Paul E. Poincy in New Orleans and then with William Merritt Chase in New York City. She attended the School of the Art Institute of Chicago and the Philadelphia Museum of Art.

In 1881 Molinary exhibited at the International Cotton Exposition in Atlanta, Georgia. In 1885 she was included in the exhibition at the World Cotton Centennial in New Orleans. Her work was also exhibited at the Cotton Palace in Waco, Texas in 1889 and the World's Columbian Exposition in Chicago in 1893.

Molinary was a member of the Artists’ Association of New Orleans, and the Southern States Art League.

In 1915 Molinary married fellow artist and mentor Andres Molinary, who died shortly thereafter.

She died on August 19, 1948, in New Orleans, Louisiana.

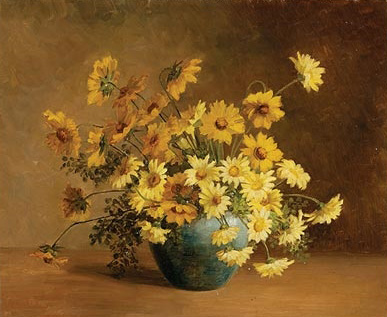
Black‑Eyed Susans in Green Art Pottery Vase

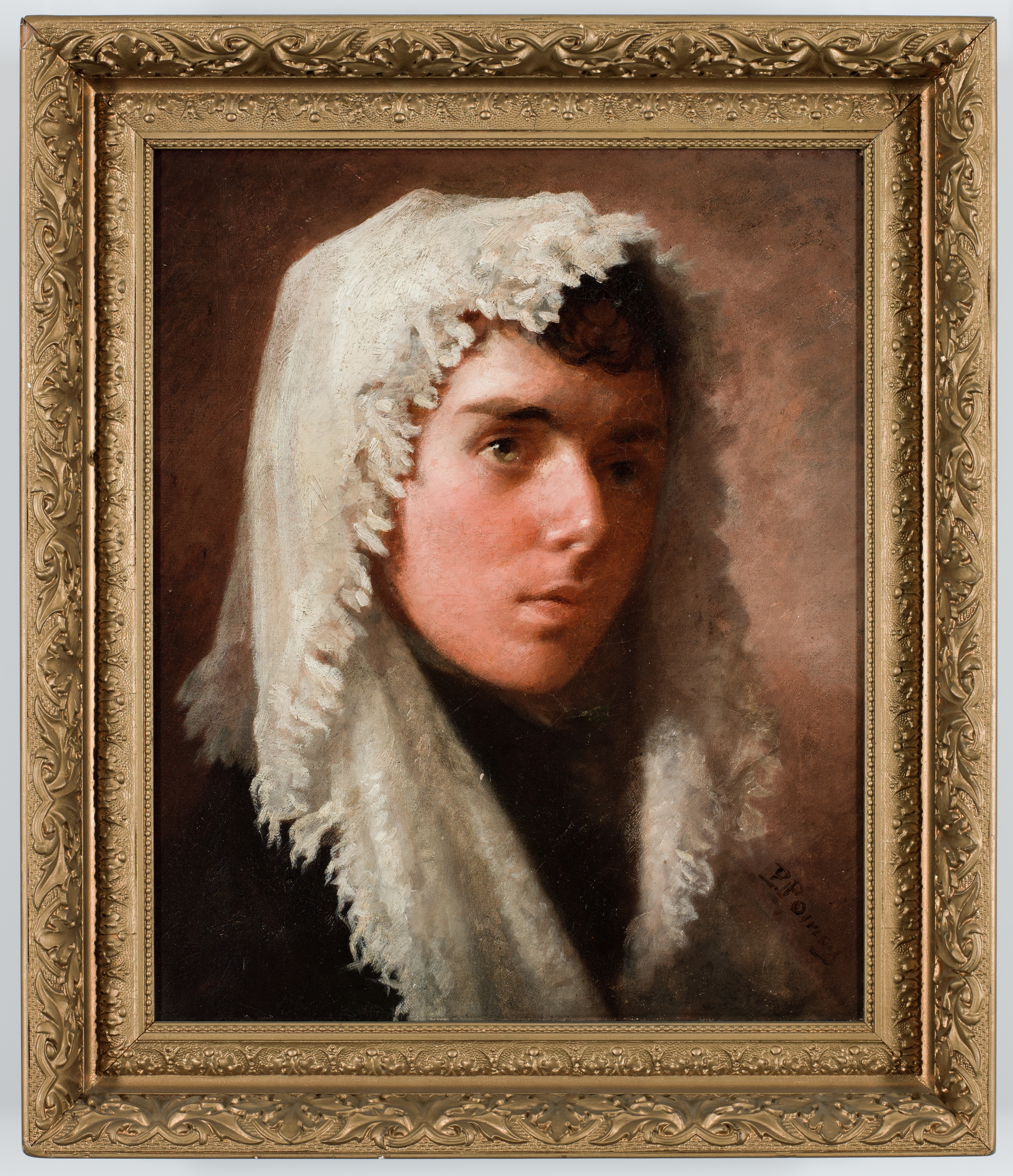
Portrait of Marie Seebold by Paul E. Poincy
