= Andres Molinary =

American painter

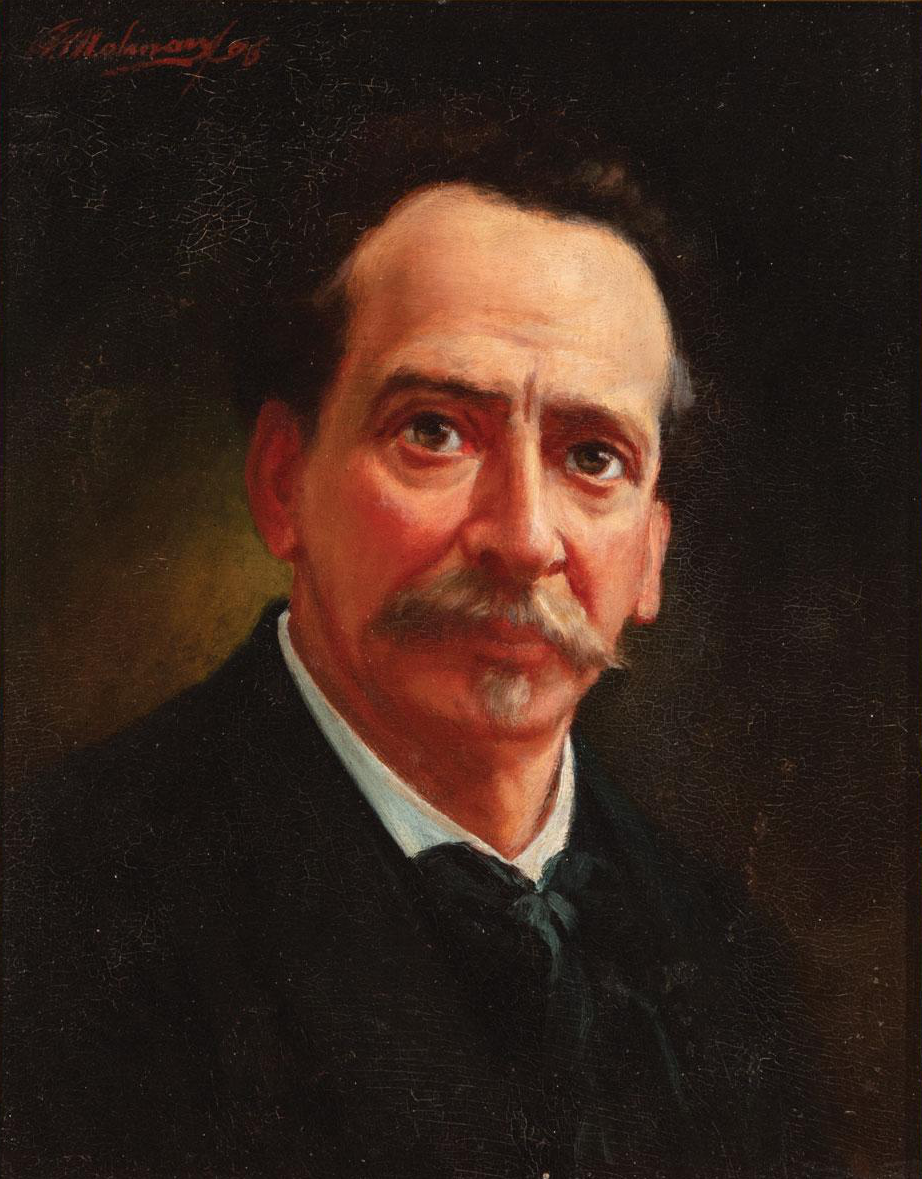
- Self-Portrait (1896)
- Born: Andrew Molinary (Note: British census records record his first name as 'Andrew'.); November 2, 1847; Gibraltar
- Died: September 11, 1915 (aged 67); New Orleans, Louisiana, U.S.
- Spouse: Marie Madeleine Seebold (m. 1915)

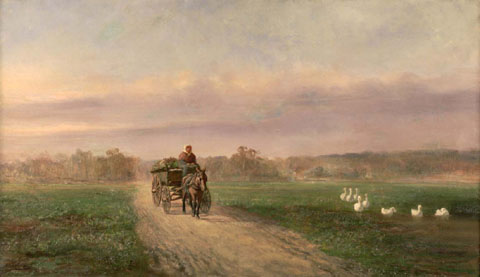
Old Gentilly Road (1890), Andres Molinary

Andres Molinary (Note: Some sources spell his first name with an accent mark, Andrés.) (1847–1915) was an artist, art teacher, restorer and photographer who painted for most of his career in New Orleans, Louisiana. His works were prominently displayed in New Orleans during his career, with exhibitions at the Southern Art Union, the World's Industrial and Cotton Centennial Exposition, and the Artists' Association of New Orleans. At the time of his death, the Delgado Museum of Art sponsored a retrospective exhibition of his works.

== Early life and training ==
Molinary was born in Gibraltar to an Italian father and Spanish mother. He won a scholarship to attend the Accademia di San Luca in Rome, and he later studied at the Real Academia de Bellas Artes in Seville, Spain. During this period, he was influenced by Spanish artist Marià Fortuny especially with respect to painting landscapes and historic vistas, and he traveled through North Africa to paint. In 1872, his uncle, John Brunasso, encouraged him to come to New Orleans to work at his import business; however, office work did not appeal to Morinary and he set up a small artists studio. After spending a year traveling and painting in Mexico and Central America, he returned to New Orleans by 1876.

== Aristic career ==
In New Orleans, Molinary established himself as a popular portrait painter, though he also was noted for his landscapes and genre scene paintings. He was considered a member of the Seebold School of artists in New Orleans.

He was involved in the formation of several artists groups in the city, including The Cup and Saucer Club, the Southern Art Union, and the Artists' Association of New Orleans. He mentored other artists through his involvement with the Artists' Association of New Orleans. Molinary's studio served as the home of the Southern Art Union.

In June 1881, the Southern Art Union opened an art school in New Orleans with Molinary teaching oil painting. In 1887, Molinary, alongside editor Mary Ashley Townsend and fellow artists Bror Anders Wikström and Ellsworth Woodward, launched Art and Letters, a short-lived bimonthly literary journal. The first issue was published in February 1887 by the Artists' Association of New Orleans, but by the second issue the group had formed the Art and Letters Association to publish it. The final issue was published in December 1887. From its opening in 1911 to his death in 1915, Molinary served on the executive committee of the Delgado Museum of Art.

In 2015, Molinary's 1884 painting North Shore, Lake Pontchartrain (Fisherman's Cabin) sold at auction for $261,500 — a record price for one of Molinary's works.

== Personal life ==
On his deathbed, Molinary married fellow artist and artistic protégé Marie Madeleine Seebold.
