= Josephine (given name) =

Josephine, Josefina
- Pronunciation: /ˈdʒoʊsəfiːn, -zə-/ French: [ʒozefin] German: [joːzəˈfiːnə]
- Gender: Female

Origin
- Origin: Hebrew
- Meaning: "She shall add/grow"

Other names
- Related names: Josefine, Josefin, Joseph, Joey, Joe, Josie, Josef

Josephine is a female name. It is the English version of the French name Joséphine, itself a female variant of the name Joseph, which is ultimately derived from the Hebrew name Yosef (Hebrew: יוֹסֵף), meaning "he shall add/grow".

== Variations ==
Originally a diminutive form of the French name Josèphe, Joséphine became the standard form in the 19th century, replacing Josèphe, which eventually became a very rare name. In 2017, Josephine was the 107th most popular girls' baby name in the US. Diminutive forms of this name include Fifi, Jo, Josie, Joetta and Jojo. Other language variants include the Irish version Seosaimhín, the Spanish version Josefina or Josephina, and the Greek version Iosiphina (Greek: Ιωσηφίνα). Alternate spellings include Yosefina and Gosefine. The Swedish version is Josefin or Josefine.

The name started gaining popularity after 1800 due to the high profile of Joséphine de Beauharnais, a French noblewoman who became Napoleon's mistress and later his wife and Empress of the French.

== Translations ==
- Jozefina, Xhozefina, Gjozefina, Gjyzepina (Albanian)
- جوزفين (Arabic)
- Жазэфіна, Žazefina (Belarusian)
- Josefina, Fina, Josefa (Catalan)
- 约瑟芬, Yuēsèfēn (Chinese Simplified)
- 約瑟芬, Yuēsèfēn (Chinese Traditional)
- Josipa, Jozefina, Finka, Ina (Croatian)
- Josefine (Danish)
- Jozefien, Josefien, Fien (Dutch)
- Josephine, Josephin (English)
- Josefiina (Finnish)
- Joséphine, Fifi, Josette, Josiane (French)
- Josefine (German)
- Ιωσηφίνα, Io̱si̱fína (Greek)
- જોસેફાઈન, Jōsēphā'īna (Gujarati)
- ג'וזפין (Hebrew)
- जोसफिन, Jōsaphina (Hindi)
- Jozefina, Jozefin, Jozefa (Hungarian)
- Yosephine, Josefa, Josepha, Josephira, Josephine, Josephina, Yosefin, Yosefina, Josefina, Yosepha, Finka, Ina (Indonesian)
- Giuseppina (Italian)
- ジョセフィン, Josefuin (Japanese)
- ಜೋಸೆಫೀನ್, Jōsephīn (Kannada)
- 조세핀, Josepin (Korean)
- Џозефин, Džozefin (Macedonian)
- ജോസഫൈൻ, Josephine (Malayalam)
- Жозефина, Jozyefina (Mongolian)
- जोसेफिन, Jōsēphina (Nepali)
- ژوزفین (Persian)
- Józefina (Polish)
- Josefina (Portuguese)
- Жозефина, Zhozefina (Russian)
- Iosefina (Samoan)
- Јосефина, Josefina (Serbian)
- Josefina (Spanish)
- Josefina, Josefine, Josefin (Swedish)
- ஜோசபின், Jōcapiṉ (Tamil)
- జోసెఫిన్, Jōsephin (Telugu)
- โจเซฟิน, Josefin (Thai)
- Жозефіна, Zhozefina (Ukrainian)
- דזשאָסעפינע, Dzşʼásʻpynʻ (Yiddish)

== Nicknames ==
Jobe, Joby, JJ, Jowse, Jody, Jossan, Fi, Fientje, Fifi, Fike, Fina, Jael, Jo, Joephy, Joey, Joja, Jojo, Jos, Josa, Josie, Josy, Jovi, Johnny, Jussus, Juza, Pepi, Peppa, Phinie, Posey, Posy, Posie, Sefi, Sefina, Sephie, Sephine, Sophie, Ephine, Effy, Jo-Z, Joan, Jayla, Jay, Fini, Fine, Finka, Finni.

== People with the given name Josephine ==
=== Royalty ===
- Joséphine-Charlotte of Belgium (1927–2005), Princess of Belgium, Grand Duchess of Luxembourg
- Josephine of Leuchtenberg (1807–1876), Queen of Sweden
- Joséphine de Beauharnais (1763–1814), Empress of France, Queen Consort of Italy, first wife of Napoleon Bonaparte
- Princess Joséphine of Lorraine (1753–1797), Princess of Carignano
- Josephine of Rosenborg (1942–2013), Countess, member of Denmark's Royal Family
- Princess Josephine of Baden (1813–1900), Princess of Hohenzollern-Sigmaringen
- Princess Joséphine Caroline of Belgium (1872–1958), wife of Prince Karl Anton of Hohenzollern
- Princess Josephine of Denmark (born 2011), Danish princess

=== Other ===
- Joséphin Péladan (1858–1918), French novelist and martinist
- Josephine Abady (1949–2002), American stage director, film director, and producer
- Josephine Abercrombie (1926–2022), American horsewoman, businesswoman, boxing promoter, and philanthropist
- Josephine Adreon (1844–1911), American landscape painter
- Josephine Baker (1906–1975), American dancer, jazz and pop singer
- Josephine Bakhita (1869–1947), ex-slave from Sudan, Catholic nun and saint
- Josephine Balmer (born 1959), British poet and translator
- Josephine Baerveldt-Haver (1868–1945), Dutch women's suffrage activist
- Josephine Bell (1897–1987), English author
- Josephine Thorndike Berry (1871–1945), American educator, home economist
- Josephine Beatrice Bowman (1881–1971), US Navy nurse
- Josephine Bracken (1876–1902), Filipina wife of José Rizal
- Josephine Brandell (1887–1977), Austrian-Jewish actress
- Josephine Brunsvik (1779–1821), Hungarian countess, most likely Beethoven's Immortal Beloved
- Jo Budd (born 1961), British textile artist
- Josephine Bulmer (born 1996), Australian canoeist
- Josephine Bunch, British physicist
- Josephine Butler (1828–1906), British feminist and reformer
- Joséphine Calamatta (1817–1893), French painter
- Josephine Cashman, Aboriginal Australian lawyer and entrepreneur
- Joséphine Cavallini, known as Fifi Turin (1913–1944), French war resistor killed by Gestapo
- Josephine Chaplin (1949–2023), American actress
- Josephine Cochrane (1839–1913), American inventor
- Joséphine Colomb (1833–1892), French children's writer, lyricist, translator
- Josephine Cox (1938–2020), English author
- Josephine Dias (born 1948), Indian Eucharistic minister and actress
- Josephine Dillon (1884–1971), American actress and drama teacher
- Joséphine de La Baume (born 1984), French actress
- Josephine Dunn (1906–1983), American actress
- Josephine Earp (1861–1944), American common-law wife of Wyatt Earp
- Josephine Ann Endicott (born 1950), Australian dancer
- Jo Fletcher (academic), New Zealand professor of education
- Josephine Clay Ford (1923–2005), granddaughter of Henry Ford
- Josephine Forsman (born 1981), Swedish drummer and member of Sahara Hotnights
- Josephine Foster, American folk singer
- Josephine Frigge (born 1993), Swedish footballer
- Josephine Garcia, American politician
- Josephine Clara Goldmark (1877 – December 15, 1950), American reformer
- Josephine Sophia White Griffing (1814–1872), American activist
- Josephine Healion (born 1995), Irish para-cyclist
- Josephine Henry (1846–1928), American women's rights leader, suffragist, social reformer and writer
- Josephine Herrick (1897–1972), American photographer, humanitarian, entrepreneur and teacher
- Josephine R. Hilgard (1906–1989), American developmental psychologist
- Josephine Ho (born 1951), Taiwanese academic and feminist
- Josephine Hoey (1822–1896), Anglo-American stage actress
- Josephine Højbjerg (born 2003), Danish actress
- Josephine Hopper (1883–1968), American painter and model
- Josephine Humphreys (born 1945), American novelist
- Josephine Hutchinson (1903–1998), American actress
- Josephine Irwin (1890–1984), American suffragist
- Josephine Jacobsen (1908–2003), American-Canadian poet
- Joséphine Jobert (born 1985), French actress and singer
- Josephine Kane, British academic and historian of architecture
- Joséphine Nyssens Keelhoff (1833–1917), Belgian activist, social reformer, editor
- Josephine Gates Kelly (1888–1976), Native American activist and politician
- Josephine Kermode (1852–1937), Manx poet and playwright
- Josephine Klein (1926–2018), German-born British psychologist
- Josephine Alstrup Kofod (born 1999), Danish politician
- Josephine Lacson-Noel, (born 1967), Filipino politician
- Josephine Lang (1815–1880), German composer
- Josephine Langford (born 1997), Australian actress
- Josephine Lemoyan, Tanzanian sociologist and politician
- Joséphine Léno, Guinean educator, trade unionist and politician
- Josephine Lips (born 1976), Australian former representative rower
- Josephine Shaw Lowell (1843–1905), American reform leader and philanthropist
- Josephine Lucchese (1893–1974), American opera singer
- Josephine MacLeod (1858–1949), American devotee of Swami Vivekananda
- Josephine Mandamin (1942–2019), Anishinaabe grandmother, elder and founding member of water protectors
- Josephine McGill (1877–1919), American composer and music historian
- Josephine Meckseper, German artist
- Josephine Medina (1970–2021), Filipino table tennis player
- Josephine Meeker (1857–1882), American teacher and physician
- Josephine Melville (1961–2022), British actress, director and writer
- Josephine Miles (1911–1985), American poet and academic
- Josephine Mitchell (born 1965), Australian actress
- Josephine Moon, Australian author
- Josephine Louise Le Monnier Newcomb (1816–1901), American philanthropist
- Josephine R. Nichols (1838–1897), American lecturer and temperance reformer
- Josephine Obermann (born 1983), German curler
- Joséphine Pagnier (born 2002), French ski jumper
- Josephine Preston Peabody (1874–1922), American poet
- Josephine Amelia Perkins (born c. 1818), British horse thief and prisoner
- Josephine Corliss Preston (1873–1958), American educator and politician
- Josephine Roberto (born 1977), Filipina songwriter, actress and music producer
- Josephine Robinson Roe (1858–1946), American mathematician and university professor
- Josephine Ryan (1884–1977), Irish nationalist
- Josephine Siao (born 1947), Hong Kong actress
- Josephine E. Sizer (1862–1937), American temperance reformer
- Josephine Skriver (born 1993), Danish model
- Josephine Sparre (1829–1892), Swedish noble
- Josephine Spencer (1861–1928), American writer, journalist and political activist
- Josephine St. Pierre Ruffin (1842–1924), American publisher, journalist, civil rights leader, suffragist, and editor
- Josephine Staton (born 1961), American judge
- Joséphine Teakarotu (born 1969), French Polynesian politician
- Josephine Tewson (1931–2022), British actress
- Josephine Tey (1896–1952), Scottish author
- Josephine "Josie" Valeri (born 2001), American soccer player
- Josephine Waconda (1935–2013), American nurse and administrator
- Josephine Ward (1864–1932), British writer
- Josephine Wiggs (born 1965), British musician
- Josephine "Jo" Williams (born 1948), British businesswoman
- Josephine Wratten (born 1992), British rower
- Josephine McDonald Yarbrough (1879–1961), American writer and clubwoman
- Josephine Silone Yates (1852 or 1859–1912), American chemist

== Fictional characters ==
- Josephine Balsamo, a.k.a. Countess Cagliosto, antagonist of Arsène Lupin in novels
- Dr Josephine Jo Karev, in the television series Grey's Anatomy
- Josephine Joey Potter, in the television series Dawson's Creek
- Josephine Montilyet, in the video game Dragon Age Inquisition

== See also ==
- Josephina (disambiguation)
- Josephine (disambiguation)
- Josie (name)
- Giuseppina (given name)
- "Josephine the Singer, or the Mouse Folk", a short story by Franz Kafka
