= Posey =

Posey may refer to:

== Places ==
- Posey, California
- Posey, Illinois
- Posey, Texas
- Posey, West Virginia
- Posey County, Indiana
- Posey Township, Indiana (disambiguation)

== People ==
- Posey (given name)
- Posey (surname)
- Posey (Paiute) (1860s–1923), Paiute chief
- Posey G. Lester (1850–1929), American politician
- Posey Rorer (1891–1936), an old-time musician

== Other uses ==
- Posey House (disambiguation)
- Posey vest, a type of medical restraint

== See also ==
- Posie or nosegay
- Posy (given name)—Includes Posee, Posey, Posi, and Posie
