= Poesy =

Poesy an alternative anglicized term of the French word poésie meaning poetry. It may refer to:

- Clémence Poésy (born 1982), French actress and fashion model
- Poesy ring, gold finger rings with a short inscription on their surface

== See also ==
- Poésie (disambiguation)
- Posey (disambiguation)
