= Ogden Museum of Southern Art =

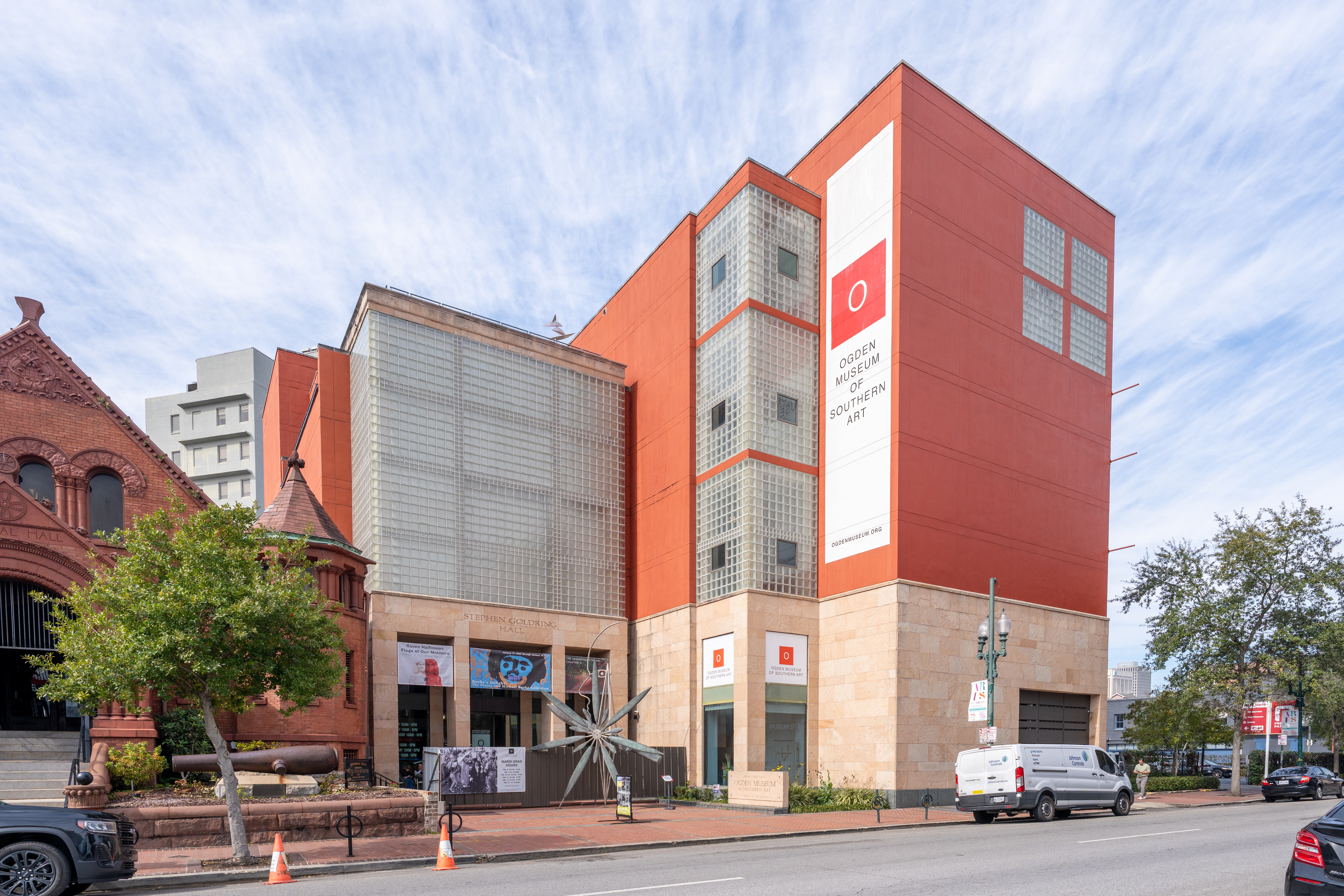
- (2026)

- Location within Louisiana
- Established: 2003
- Location: 925 Camp Street, New Orleans, Louisiana, United States
- Coordinates: 29.9437°N 90.0714°W
- Type: Art museum
- Collection size: 4000+
- Director: William Pittman Andrews
- Curators: Bradley Sumrall; Richard McCabe (photography)
- Website: www.ogdenmuseum.org

The Ogden Museum of Southern Art is a museum dedicated to art by artists from the southern United States in New Orleans, Louisiana. It was established in 1999.

== The building ==
The Ogden museum is located in the Warehouse Arts District of downtown New Orleans, and has been at its location in Stephen Goldring Hall at 925 Camp Street since 2003. It consists of two main buildings: the Patrick F. Taylor Library built in 1889 and designed by architect Henry Hobson Richardson, and the adjacent Stephen Goldring Hall (named after Stephen Goldring), a 47,000-square-foot, five-story glass and stone building designed by architects Errol Barron and Michael Toups and built in 2003. The museum also includes the Museum Store and the Center for Southern Craft and Design.

The museum's location is across the street from the National World War II Museum and the New Orleans Contemporary Arts Center. The three institutions anchor an arts district serving local residents and over 11 million visitors to New Orleans. The museum is a Smithsonian Affiliate.

== Collection ==
Area from which the museum draws its collection

The collection consists of work by artists from or associated with fifteen southern states (Alabama, Arkansas, Florida, Georgia, Kentucky, Louisiana, Maryland, Mississippi, North Carolina, Oklahoma, South Carolina, Tennessee, Texas, Virginia, and West Virginia) and the District of Columbia. It is based upon the founding donation of more than 600 works from New Orleans businessman Roger H. Ogden's private collection. Since this original donation the museum's collection of paintings, watercolors, drawings, prints, photographs, sculpture, wood and crafts has grown to include more than 4,000 works donated from individuals and collectors from across the US.

Among the many artists represented in the museum's collection are John Alexander, Walter Anderson, Benny Andrews, Clementine Hunter, George Rodrigue, George Dureau, William Dunlap, Ida Kohlmeyer, Will Henry Stevens, Kendall Shaw, Hunt Slonem, James Michalopoulos and George Ohr.

When the Ogden Museum opened in 2003, the New York Times observed that there is no easily identifiable Southern art style in the museum's collection. A sense of place, history and memory were themes that emerged. According to the Times, the artwork in the collection “range from folk art to shadowy paintings of bayous and back streets, from haunting old photographs to bright modern abstractions.”

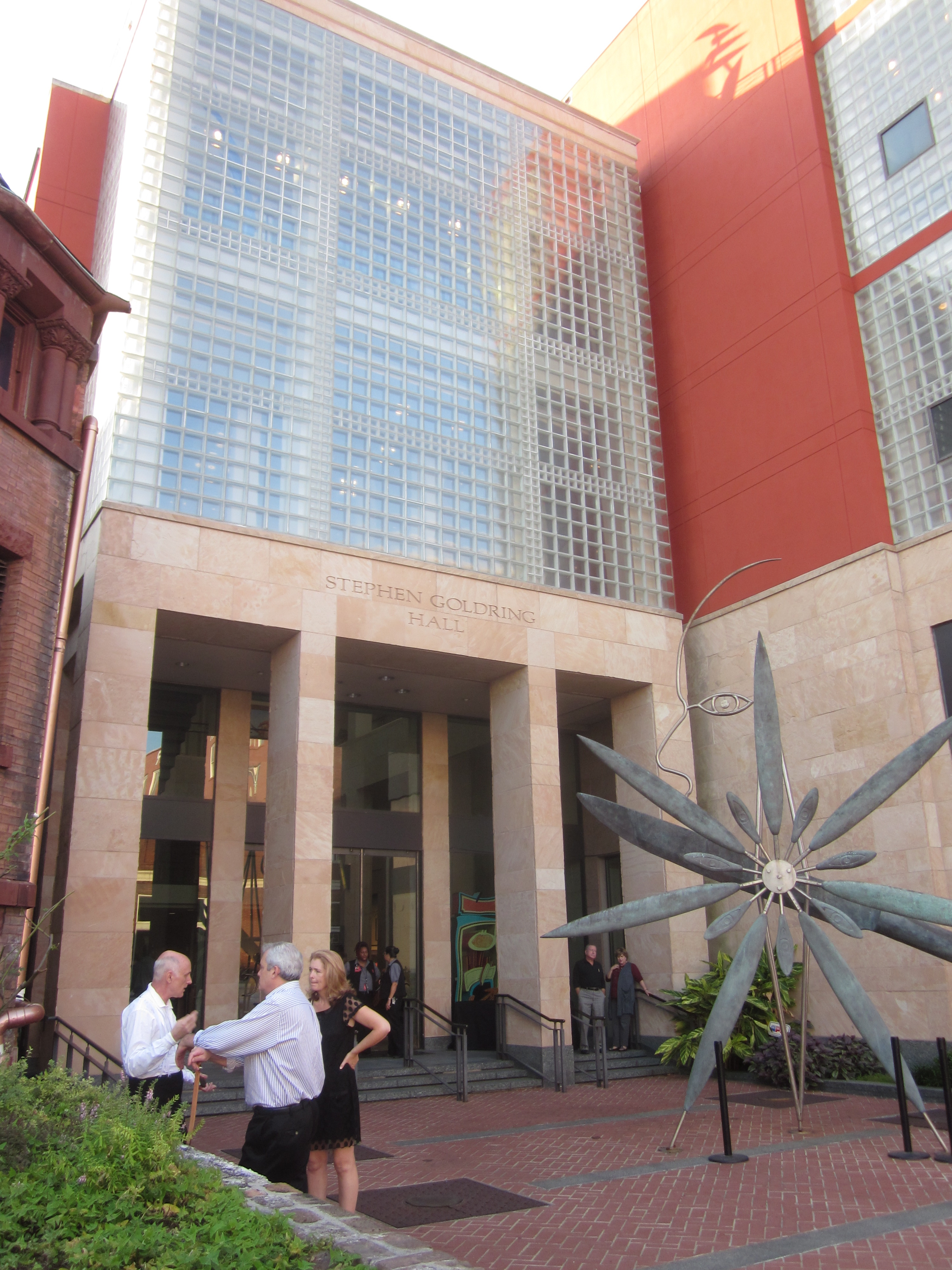
Entrance to Ogden Museum of Southern Art

The museum has permanent galleries and changing exhibitions throughout the year.

== Awards and recognition ==
The Ogden's Teen Docent Program was created in 2008 and had seen over 40 students enrolled at the time of the award. The students interacted with more than 7,000 people through museum tours, outreach programs and summer camps.

Ogden was recognized for his years of service with many non-profit organizations as well as his devotion to Southern art and his initial gift to the Ogden Museum of about 600 paintings and sculpture.

The Ogden Museum was selected to receive a grant from Bloomberg Philanthropies as part of its Arts Innovation and Management Program. The program will provide operating support and management training through a $43 million multi-year program for institutions across the country. The announcement was made in 2018.

== Gallery ==
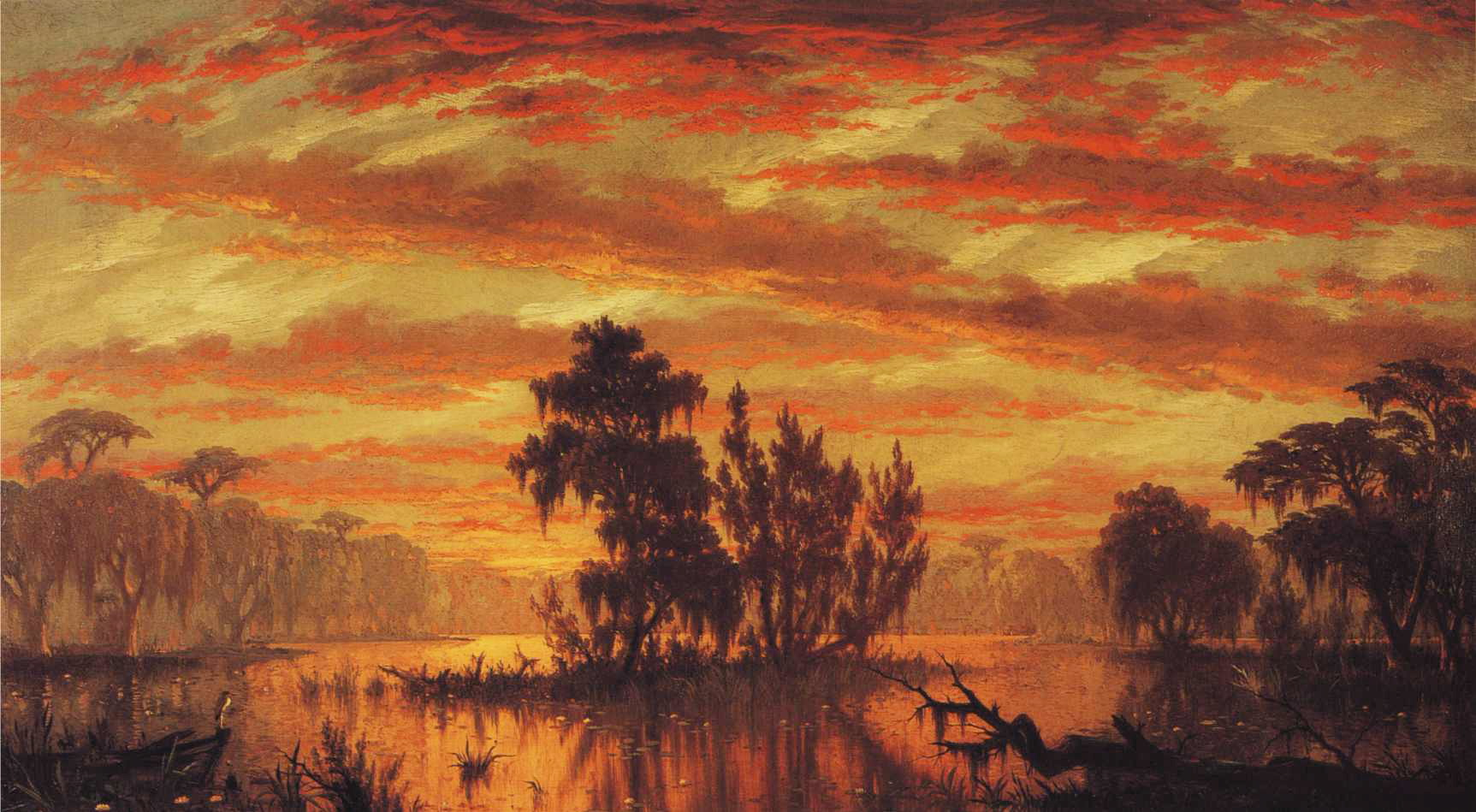
Joseph Rusling Meeker, Bayou Plaquemines, 1881

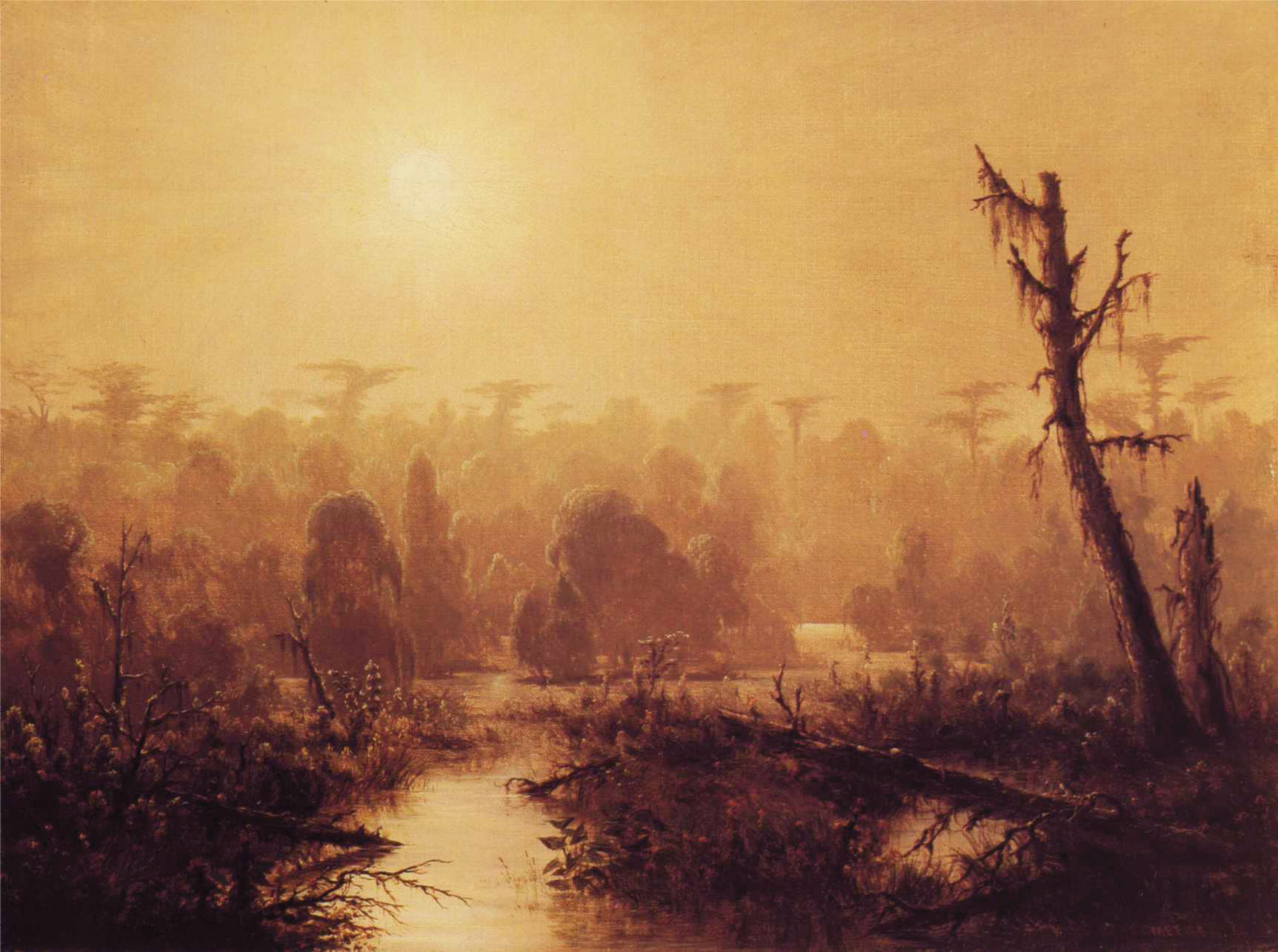
Joseph Rusling Meeker, Louisiana Bayou, 1866

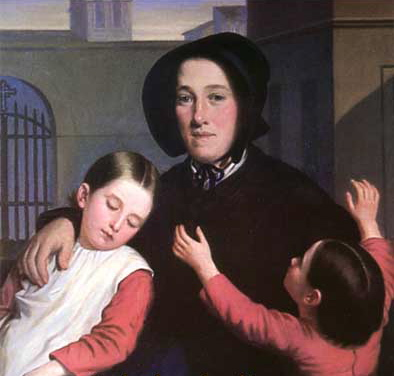
Jacques Amans, Portrait of Margaret with Two Orphans, c. 1842

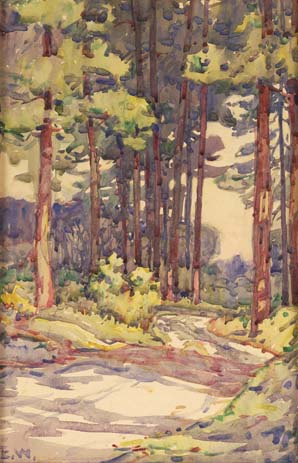
Ellsworth Woodward, Abita Springs, 1931

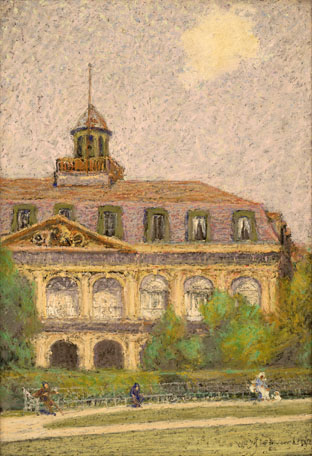
William Woodward, Cabildo, 1914

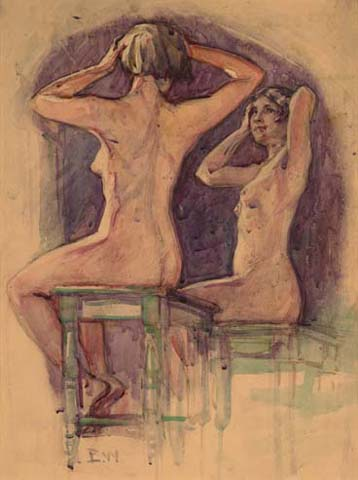
Ellsworth Woodward, Female Nude in Mirror, 1900

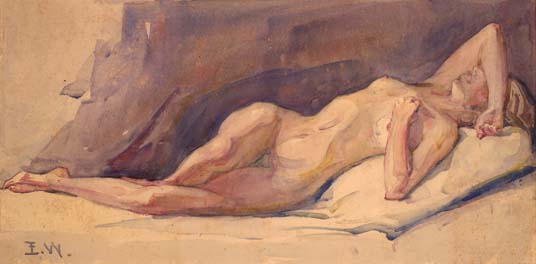
Ellsworth Woodward, Female Nude, 1920

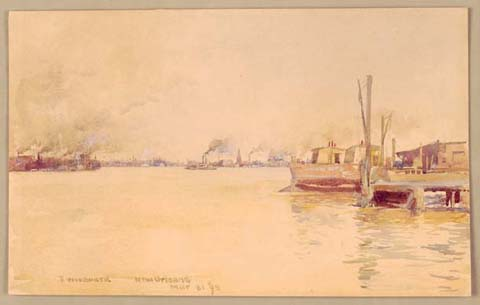
Ellsworth Woodward, New Orleans Skyline, 1893

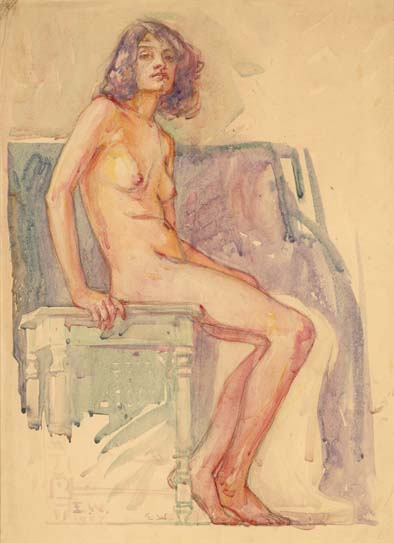
Ellsworth Woodward, Seated Female Nude, 1927

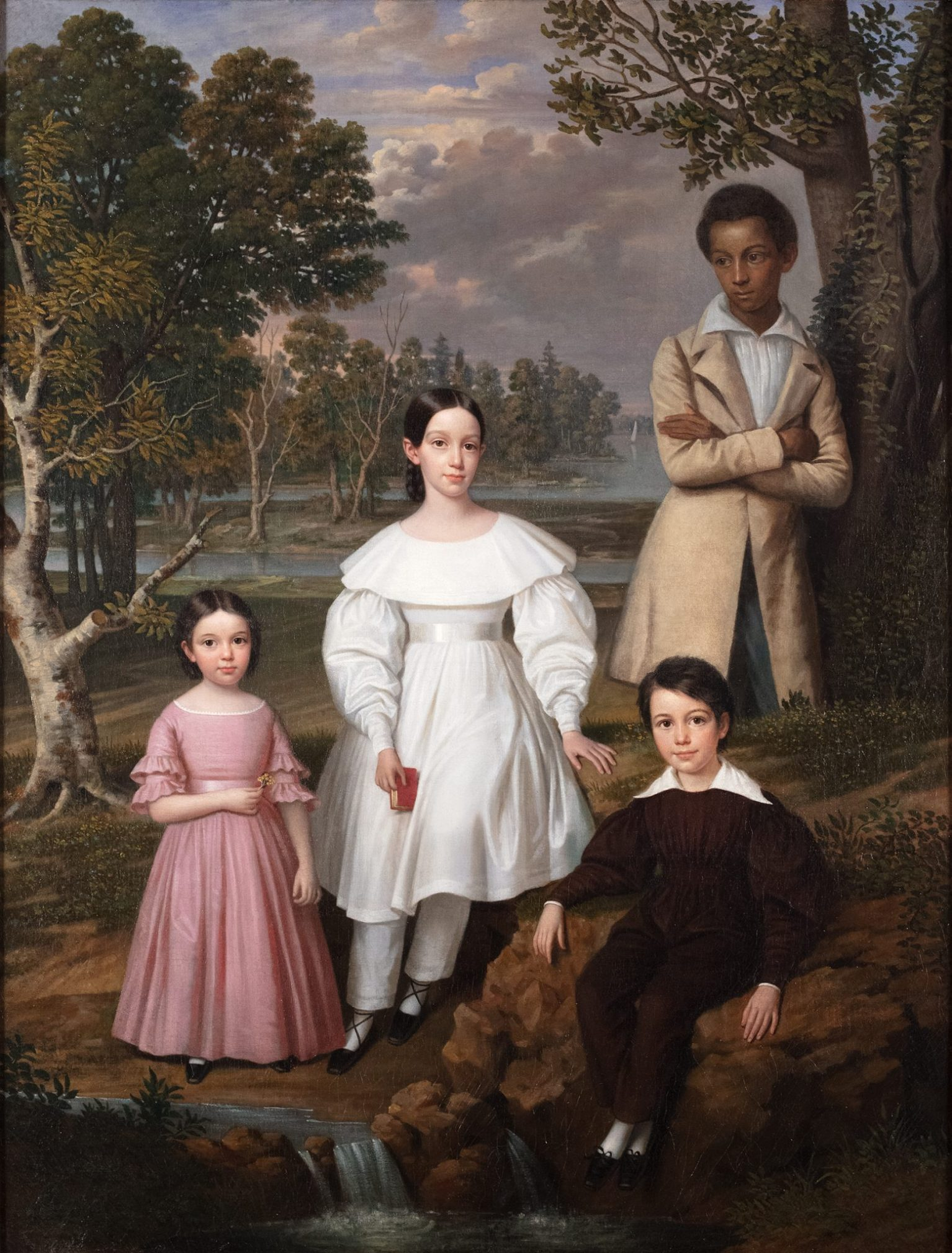
Jacques Amans, Bélizaire and the Frey Children, c. 1837

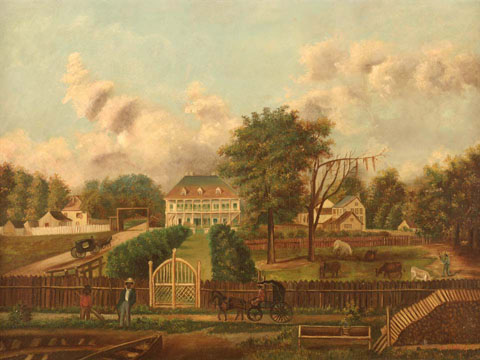
M.L. Pilsbury, Louisiana Plantation Scene, 1820

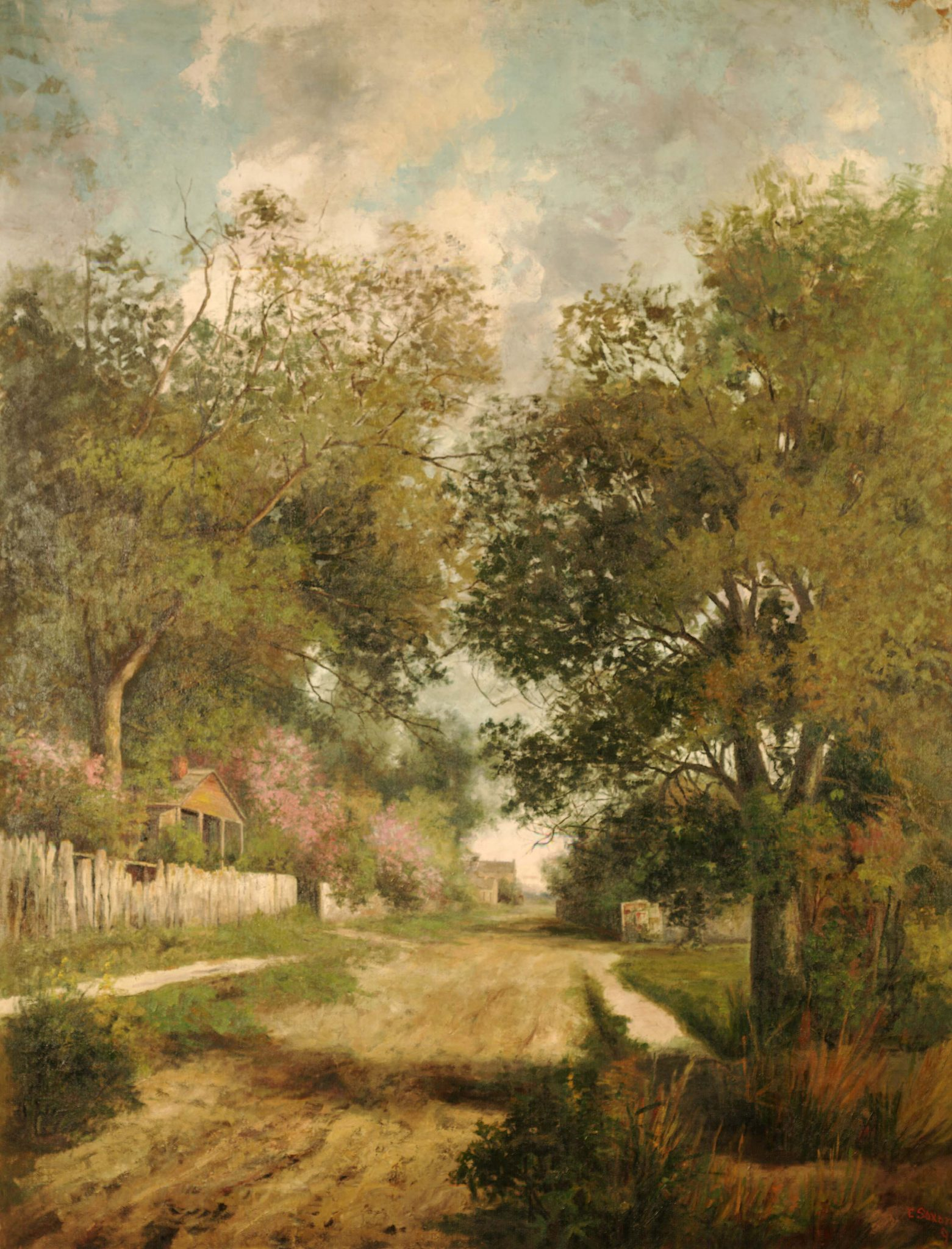
Lulu King Saxon, Uptown Street, New Orleans, 1890

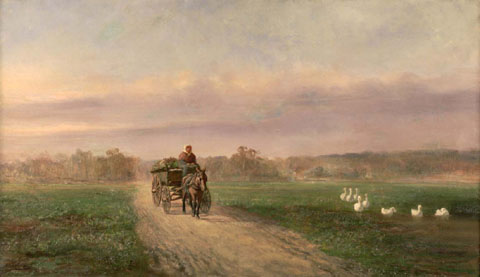
Andres Molinary, Old Gentilly Road, 1890

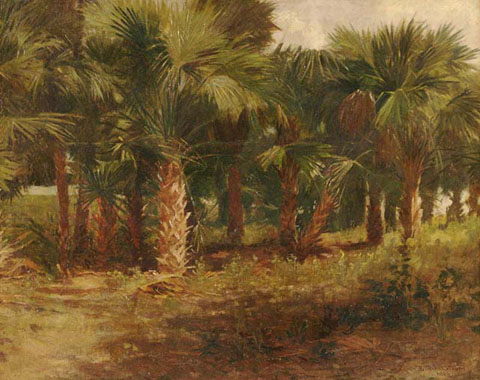
Bror Anders Wikstrom, Palmettos in City Park, New Orleans, 1900

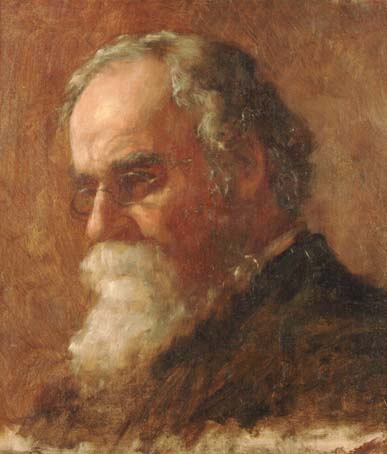
Andres Molinary, Paul Poincy, c. 1900

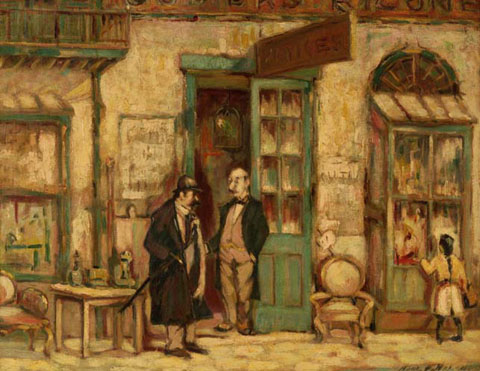
Harry Armstrong Nolan, Royal Street Antique Shop, 1918
