= Højbjerg (surname) =

Højbjerg is a Danish surname.

Notable people with the surname Højbjerg include:

- Jeppe Højbjerg (born 1995), Danish footballer
- Josephine Højbjerg (born 2003), Danish actress
- Pierre-Emile Højbjerg (born 1995), Danish footballer
