= Josefin =

Josefin is a feminine given name which may refer to:

- Josefin Abrahamsson (born 1979), Swedish table tennis player
- Josefin Åsberg (born 1974), Swedish production designer
- Josefin Asplund (born 1991), Swedish actress
- Josefin Bouveng (born 2001), Swedish ice hockey player
- Josefin Brink (born 1969), Swedish politician
- Josefin Christensen (born 1982), Swedish footballer
- Josefin Crafoord (born 1973), Swedish television and radio host
- Josefin Donat (born 1994), German nurse and Miss Germany Universe 2014
- Josefin Eder (born 1995), German sport shooter
- Josefin Hermansson (born 1990), Swedish bowler
- Josefine Holmgren (born 1993), Swedish ice hockey player
- Josefin Johansson (born 1988), Swedish footballer
- Josefin Kipper (1928–1981), Austrian actress
- Josefin Lillhage (born 1980), Swedish swimmer
- Josefin Ljungman (born 1981), Swedish actress
- Josefin Malmqvist (born 1987), Swedish politician
- Josefin Neldén (born 1984), Swedish actress
- Josefin Nilsson (1969–2016), Swedish singer and actress
- Josefin Nordlöw (born 1982), Swedish canoeist
- Josefin Olsson (born 1989), Swedish sailor
- Josefin Pettersson, Swedish ice hockey player
- Josefin Taljegård (born 1995), Swedish figure skater

== See also ==
- Josephine (given name)
- Josefine, a given name
