= Josie (name) =

Josie (/ˈdʒoʊzi/ or /ˈdʒoʊ.si/) is a given name that is often a diminutive of the female given name Josephine.

== People ==
- Josie, a ring name of professional wrestler Sojournor Bolt (born 1977)
- Josie Agius (1934–2015), aka "Aunty Josie", Aboriginal Australian educator and health worker
- Josie Aiello, American singer-songwriter
- Josie Arlington (1864–1914), American brothel madam
- Josie Aslakson (born 1995), American wheelchair basketball player
- Josie Bassett (1874–1964), American rancher associated with outlaws
- Josie Bissett (born 1970), American actress
- Josie Carroll (born 1957), Canadian Thoroughbred horse trainer
- Josie Del Castillo (born 1992), American artist
- Josie d'Arby (born 1972), Welsh television presenter
- Josie Davis (born 1973), American actress and producer
- Josie DeCarlo (1923–2012), inspiration and namesake of the fictional Josie of Josie and the Pussycats (see below)
- Josie Gibson (born 1985), British media personality and winner of Big Brother 2010
- Josie Heath (born 1937), American politician, community activist, and educator
- Josie Ho (born 1974), Hong Kong singer and actress; daughter of Macau gambling magnate Stanley Ho
- Josie Lawrence (born 1959), British comedian and actress
- Josie Leavitt, American politician
- Josie Long (born 1982), British comedian
- Josie Loren (born 1987), American actress
- Josie MacAvin (1919–2005), Irish set designer
- Josie Maran (born 1978), American model and actress
- Josie Rourke (born 1976), British theatre and film director
- Josie Totah (born 2001), American actress

== Fictional characters ==
- Josie McFarlane, in the BBC soap opera EastEnders
- Josie Packard, in the television series Twin Peaks
- Josie Russell, in the Australian soap opera Home and Away

== See also ==
- Jo (given name)
- Joseph
- Josephine (given name)
