= Joseph Rusling Meeker =

American painter (1827–1887)

- Born: April 21, 1827; Newark, New Jersey
- Died: September 27, 1887 (aged 60); St. Louis, Missouri
- Education: National Academy of Design
- Occupation: Painter
- Known for: Louisiana bayou landscapes

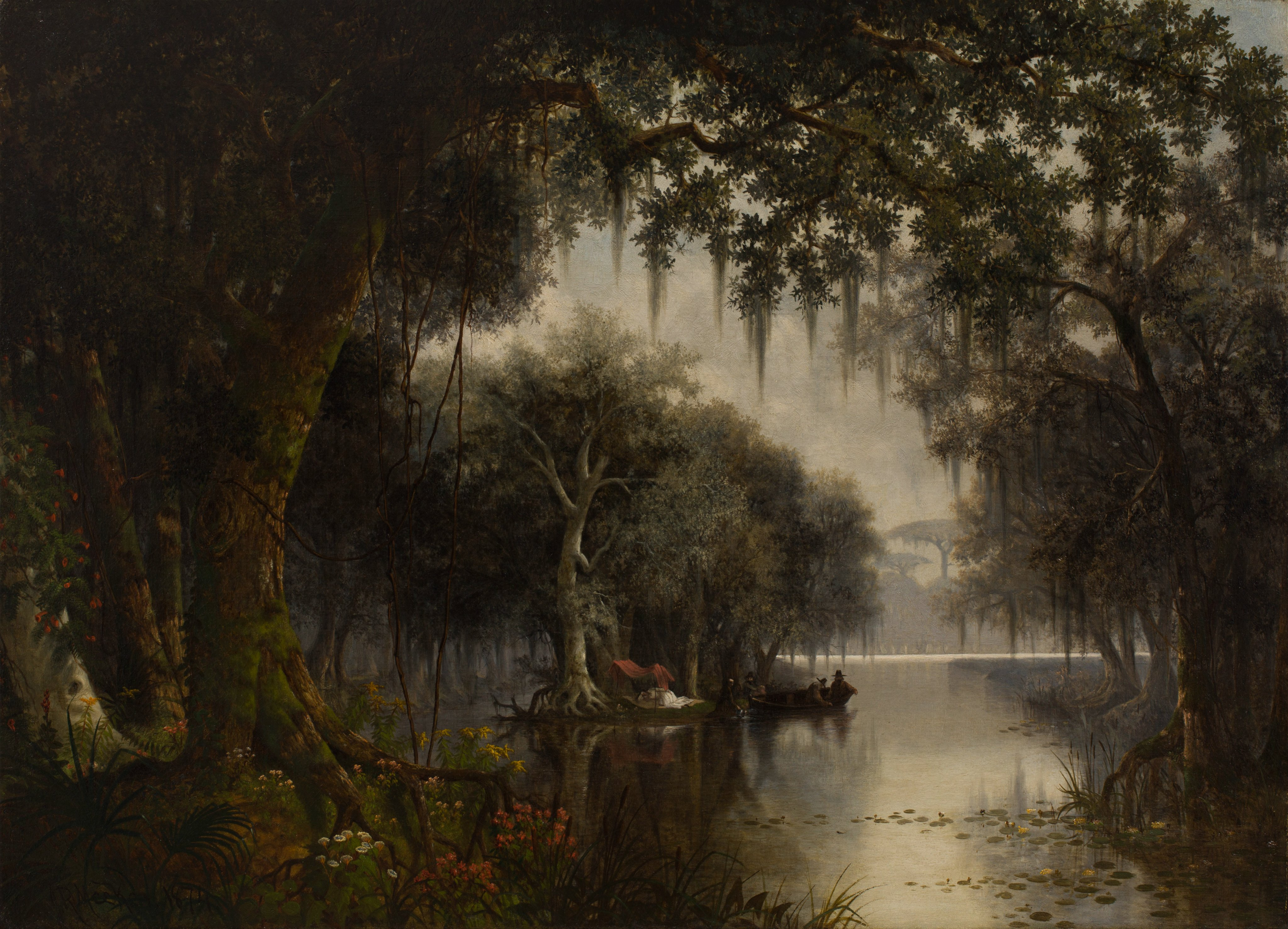
The Land of Evangeline, 1874

Joseph Rusling Meeker (Newark, New Jersey; April 21, 1827 – St. Louis, Missouri; September 27, 1887) was an American painter, known for his images of the Louisiana bayou. Art historian Estill Curtis Pennington called him "the foremost articulator of the romantic Louisiana landscape in the 19th century."

== Early life ==
Meeker was born in Newark, New Jersey, and grew up in Auburn, New York. His father's family had settled in Connecticut from what is now Belgium in 1640. His maternal grandfather and uncle were also artists. He began painting watercolors and age eight, and by age 16 operated a studio with a friend. He studied at the National Academy of Design in New York in 1845–46.

== Career ==
Finding little success in New York after graduation, he moved on to Buffalo, New York, where his career took an upswing with an exhibition at the American Art Union in 1849–50; he later exhibited at the Academy of Design in 1867, and the Boston Art Club in 1877. He moved again to Louisville, Kentucky, staying there for seven years before settling in St. Louis, Missouri, where he established a permanent studio and helped establish the St. Louis Art Society, of which he was president three times. In St. Louis Meeker took on several students including Augusta S. Bryant, and Josephine Adreon. Environmental historian Ann Vileisis notes that his swamp paintings often "shared similar compositions, iridescent colors, and a particular quality of mystery and light." He painted several works depicting the setting of Henry Wadsworth Longfellow's 1847 epic poem "Evangeline", which tells the story of the Expulsion of the Acadians from Nova Scotia and resettlement in Louisiana.

Meeker had a special sympathy with southern scenery, and has successfully rendered the landscapes of Louisiana. During the American Civil War, he served as a paymaster on a Union gunboat in Louisiana, where he began making sketches of the swamp country. Returning to St. Louis, he made a name for himself as a painter of the Southern bayou. His early paintings are almost mystical in tone, while his later works are more somber and sedate. Although many of his paintings are based on his wartime sketches from 1861–65, he returned to Louisiana frequently for the rest of his life. He also traveled widely throughout the South, especially Mississippi and Florida, where his work maintained what art historian August Trovaioli called "his singular interest in the eerie atmosphere of the cypress swamps."

Although the term was not in use during his life, 20th-century art historians would later call Meeker's work exemplary examples of the American art style known as "Luminism", in which the interplay of light and landscape was emphasized. His East Coast training (especially from Asher Brown Durand, his teacher at the Academy of Design) gave his paintings a distinct Hudson River School influence, with notable realism and attention to detail, though his use of color is his own, inspired in part by his idol, 18th-century English landscape artist J.M.W. Turner. In 1877, he wrote an article on Turner for St. Louis weekly The Western which also summed up his own artistic philosophy. He praised Turner's "infinite detail" and wrote that the most important element in a painting is "the element of repose, where the eye finally rests, quietly and peacfefully, in refreshing indolence, after scanning the multitudinous detail. ... It is impossible to view any dilapidated, moss-grown structure, whether of wood or stone, without a feeling of sadness and melancholy stealing over the heart; it is natural, and belongs to all ruin and decay." Trovaioli has noted the way Meeker's Florida canvases are "evocative of the damp, dangerous, heavy feeling of the swamps. ... Meeker emphasized the moss, the twisting tree trunks, and other particular aspects of the scene which create mood."

== Works ==
- "The Indian Chief"
- "The Acadians in the Atchafalaya"
- "The Vale of Cashmere"
- "The Lotos Eaters"
- "Louisiana Bayou"
- "The Noon-Day Rest," from Longfellow's Evangeline

== Gallery ==
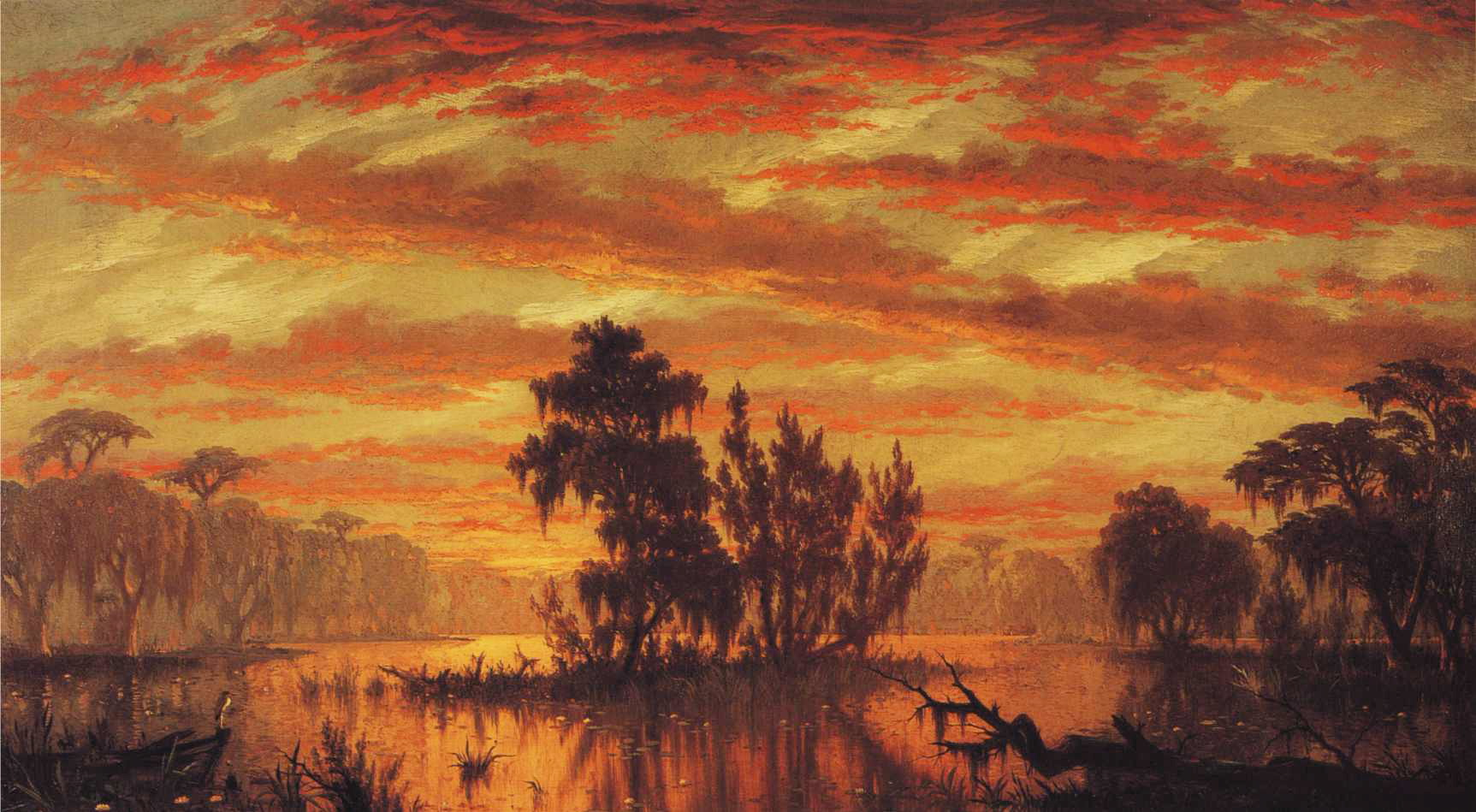
Bayou Plaquemines, 1881 (Ogden Museum of Southern Art)

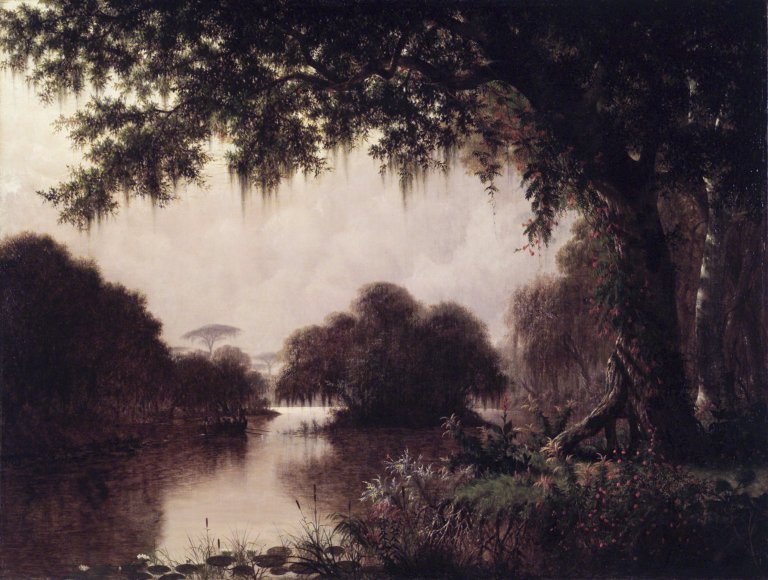
The Acadians in the Achafalaya, "Evangeline", 1871 (Brooklyn Museum)

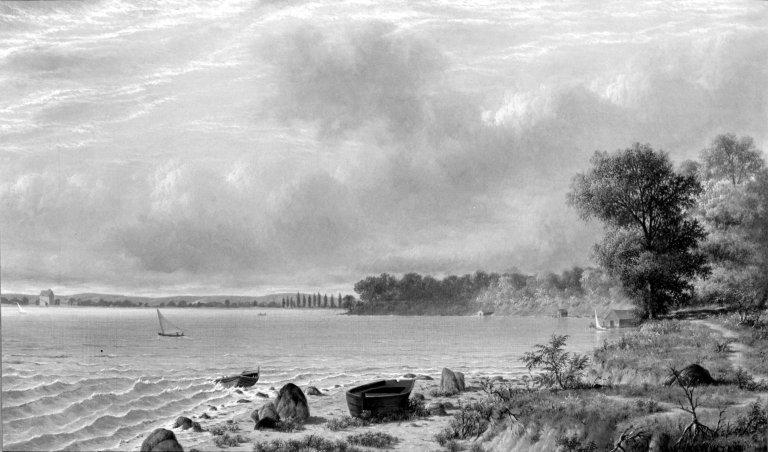
Lake Mendota, Madison, Wisconsin, 1870–71

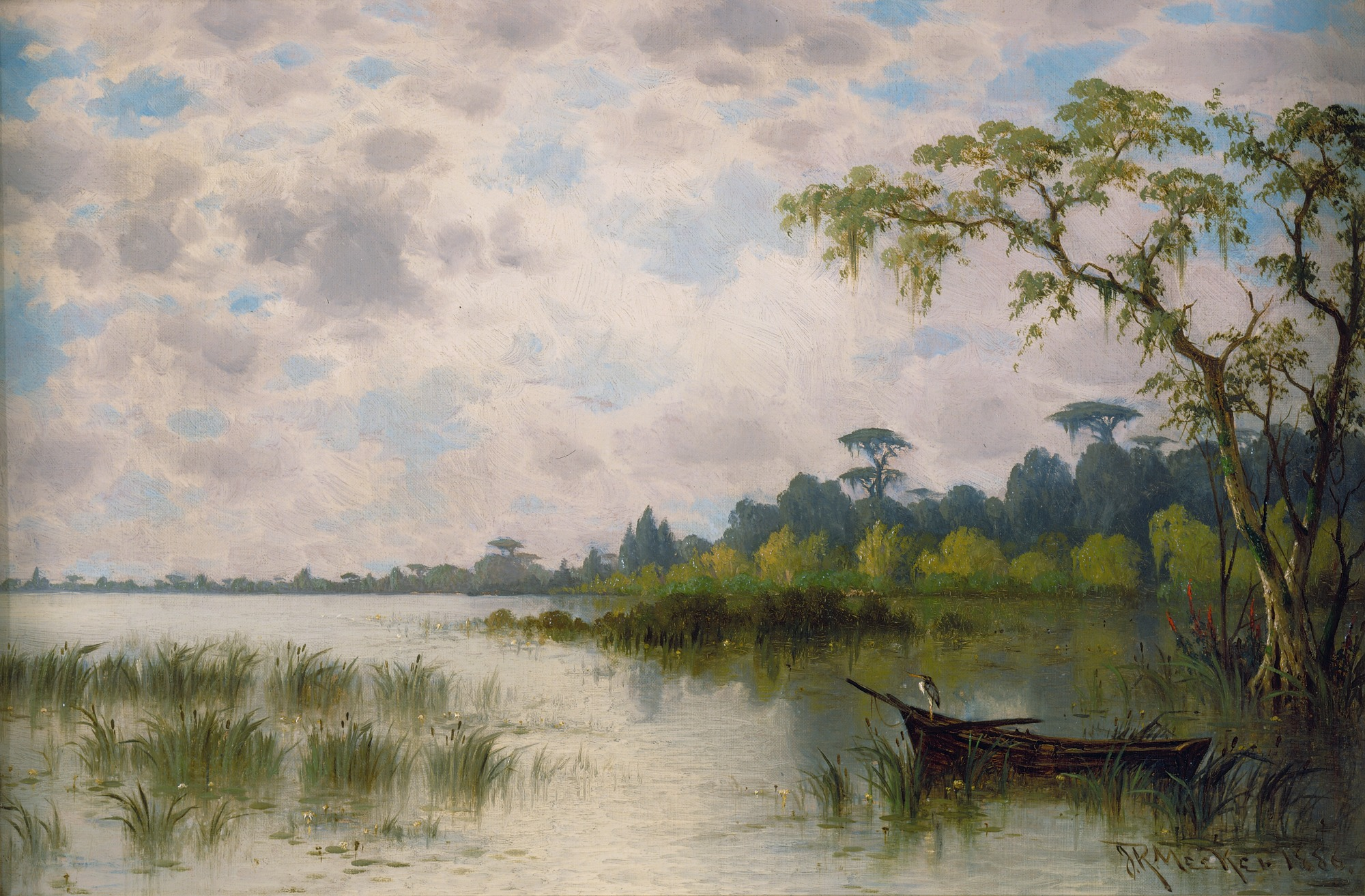
Bayou Landscape, 1886 (Morris Museum of Art)

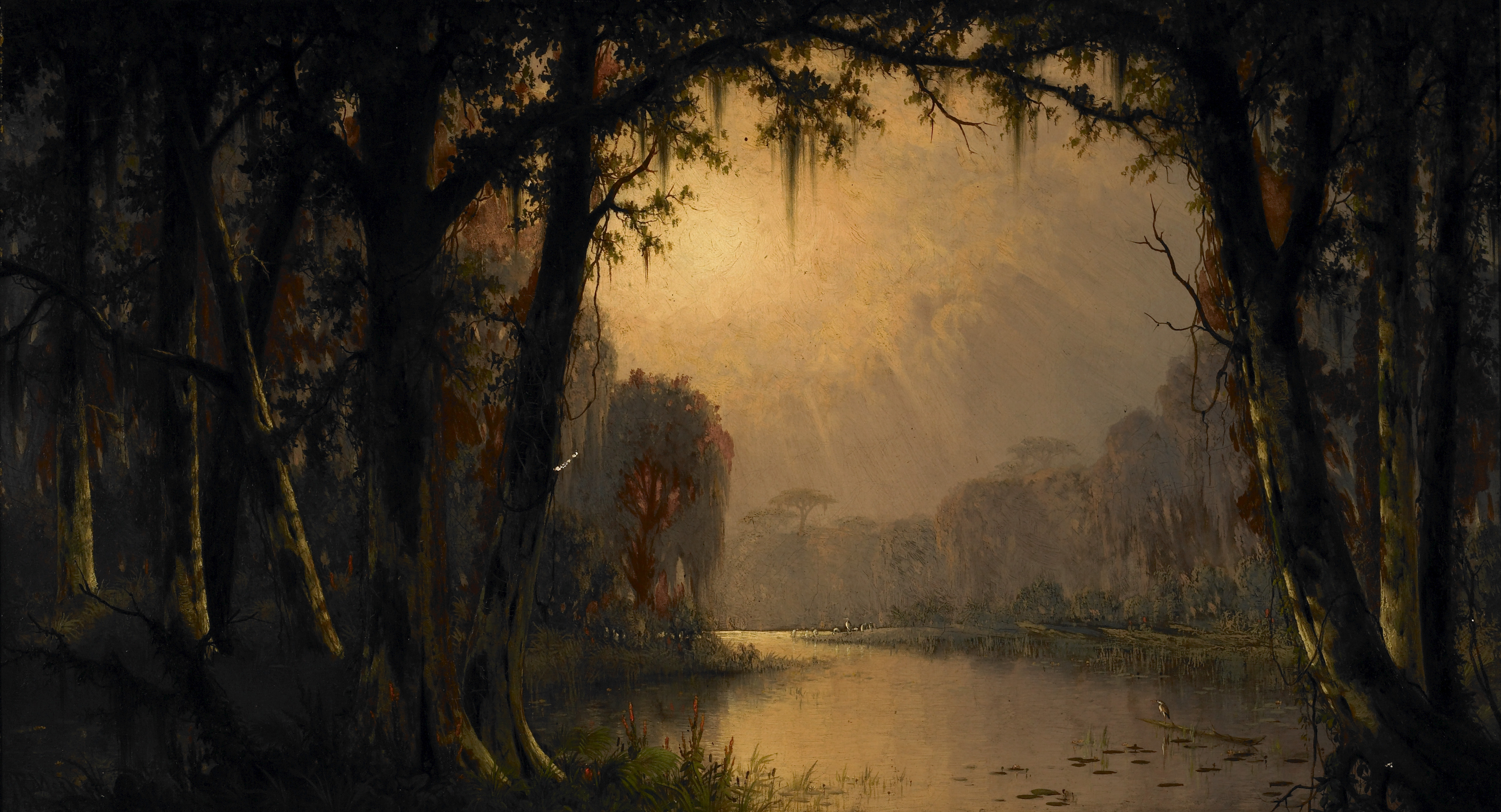
Bayou Teche, Louisiana, 1883 (Saint Louis Art Museum)

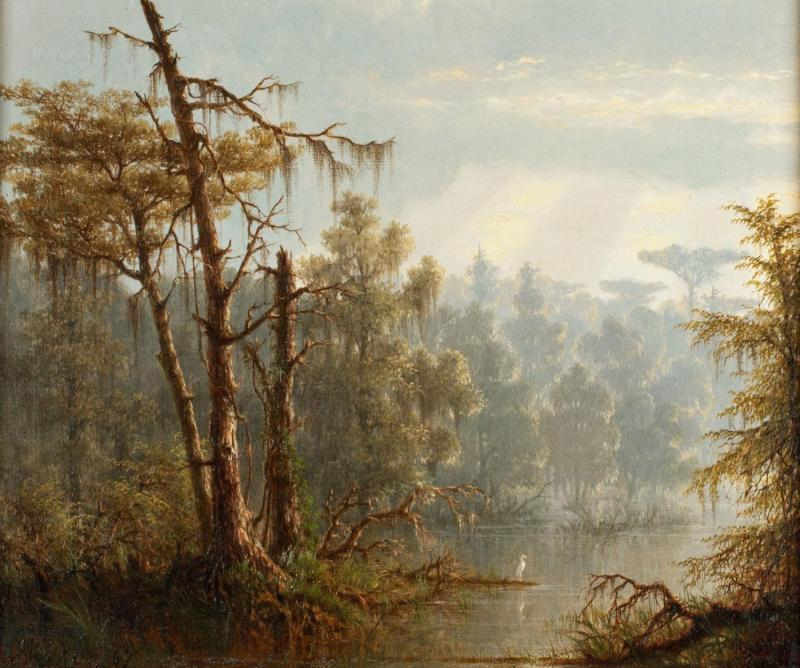
Louisiana Bayou, 1867 (New Britain Museum of American Art)

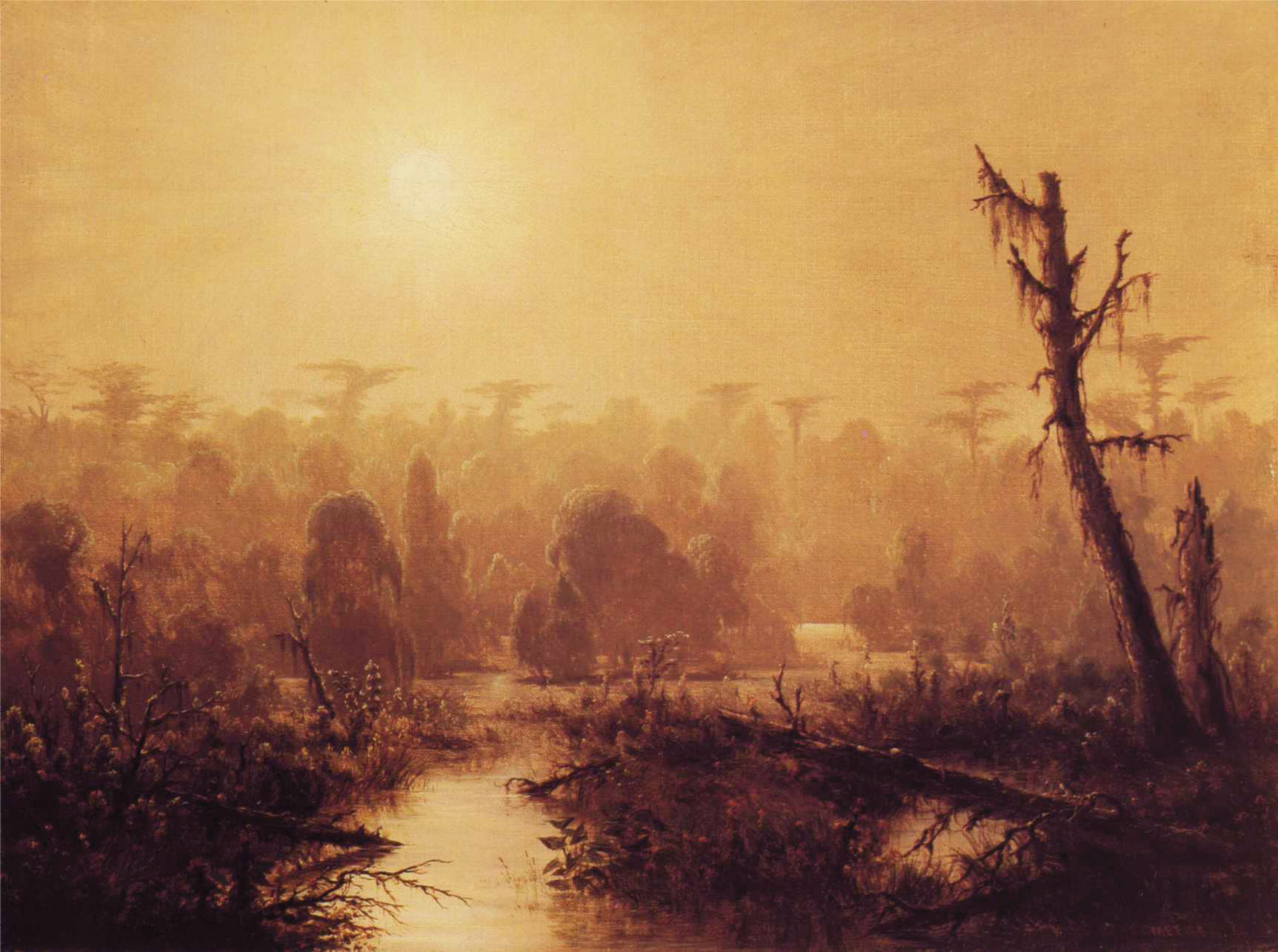
Louisiana Bayou, 1866 (Ogden Museum of Southern Art)

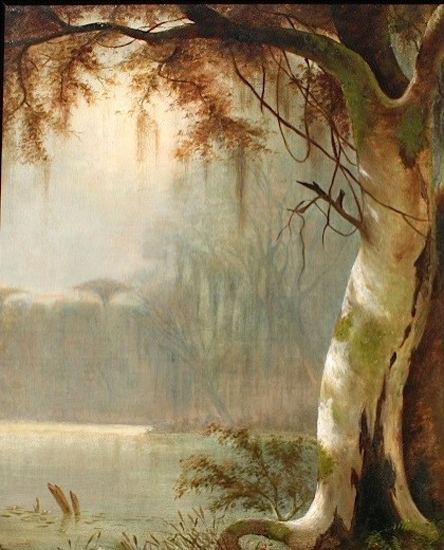
Lake Maurepas Bayou, 1880

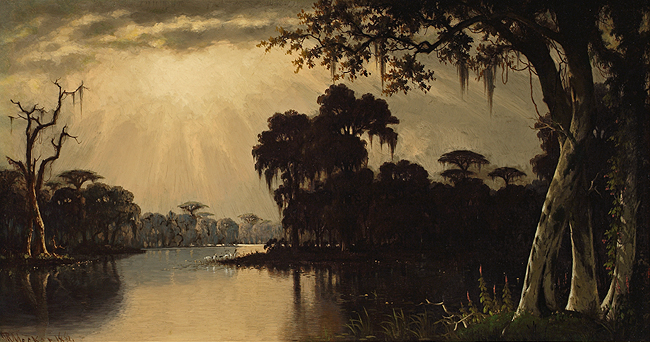
Louisiana Bayou, 1884

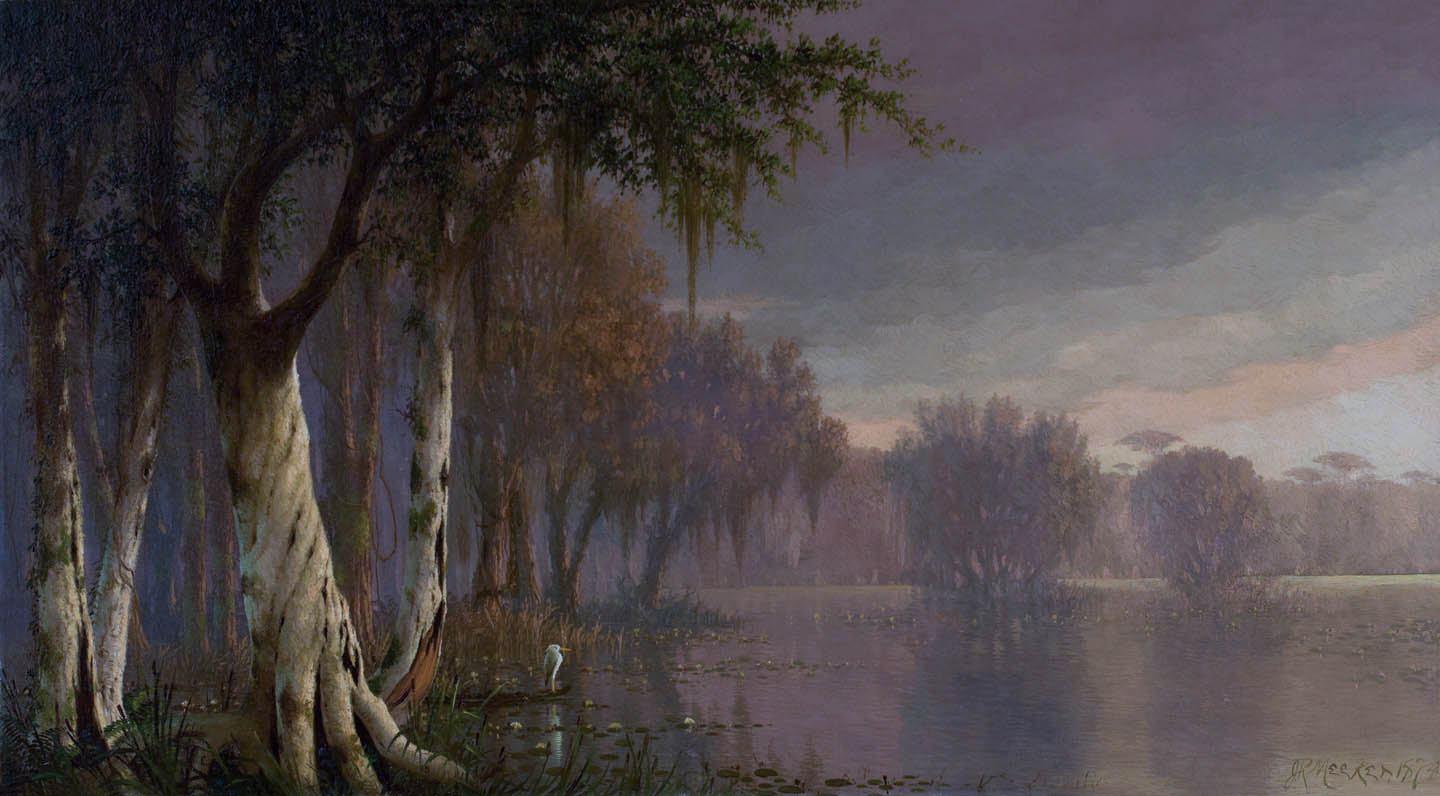
Bayou Teche, 1874 (The Johnson Collection)

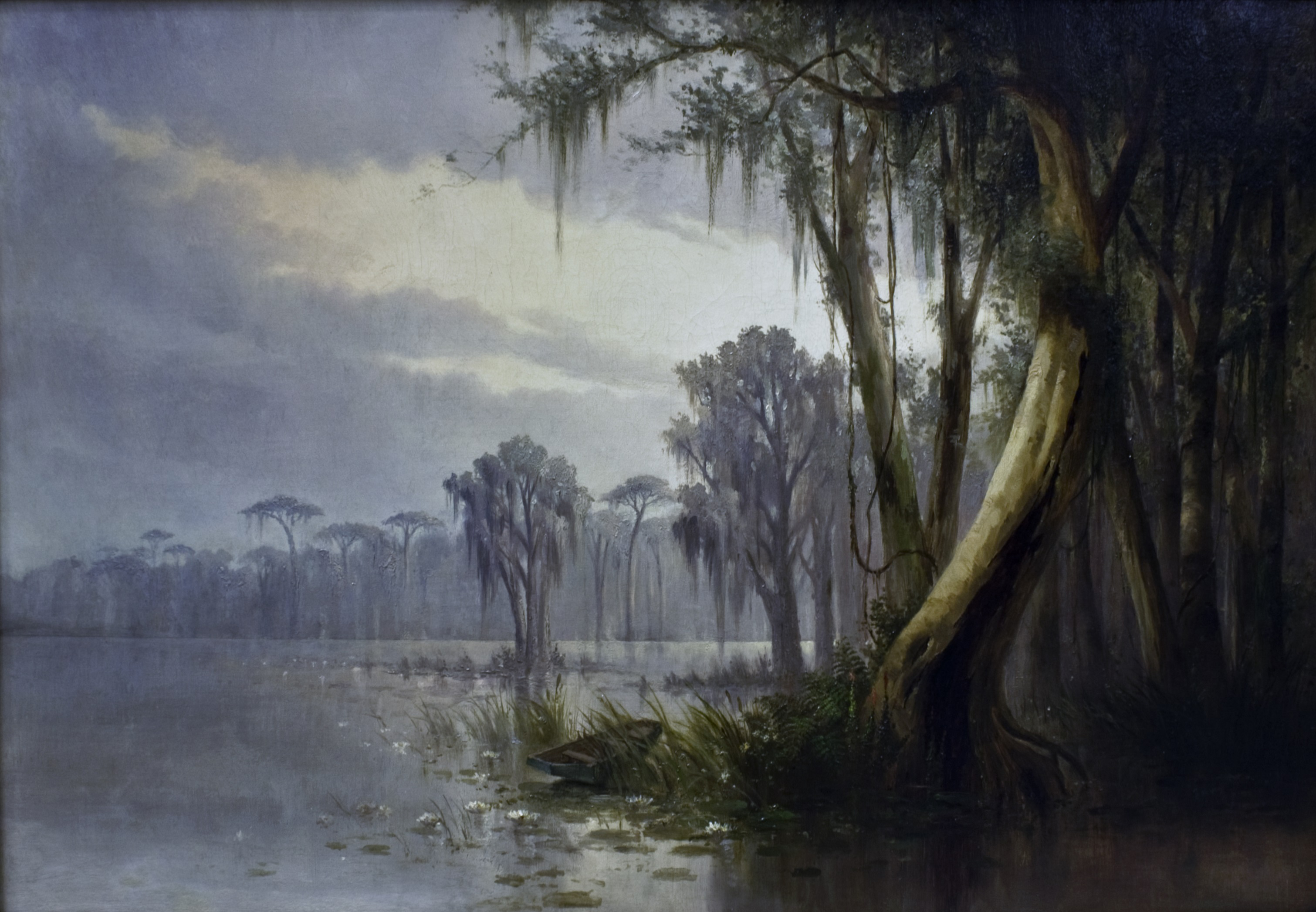
After a Storm -- Lake Maurepas, 1888

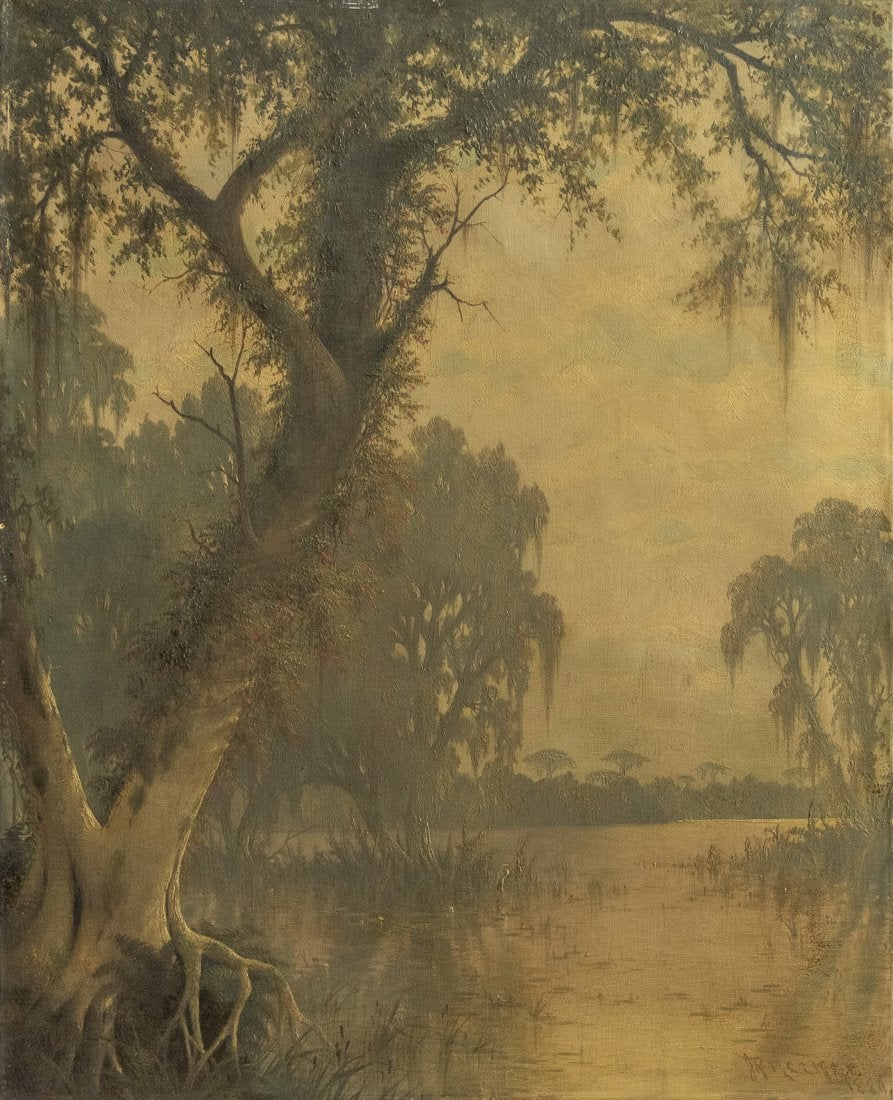
Bayou Scene, 1886

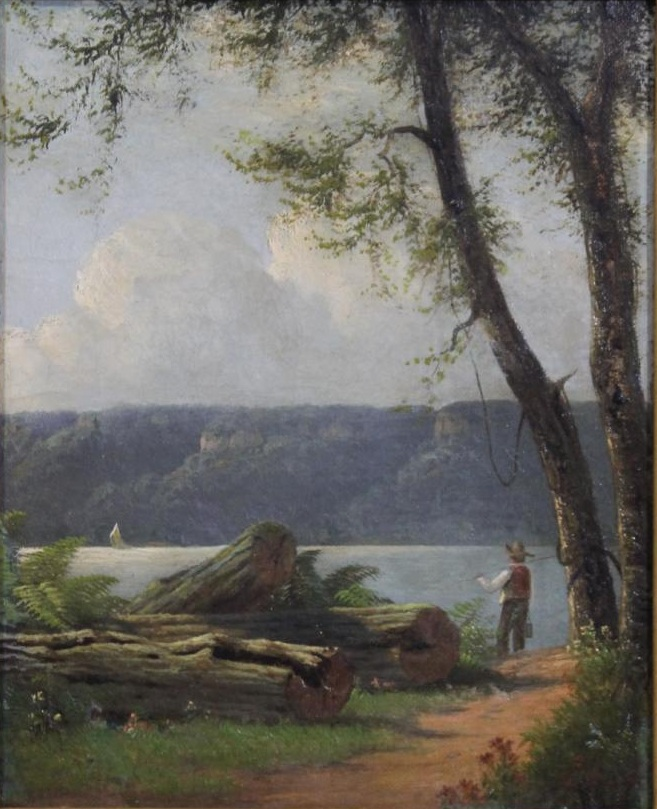
Mississippi River Bluffs, 1881
