= Ellsworth Woodward =

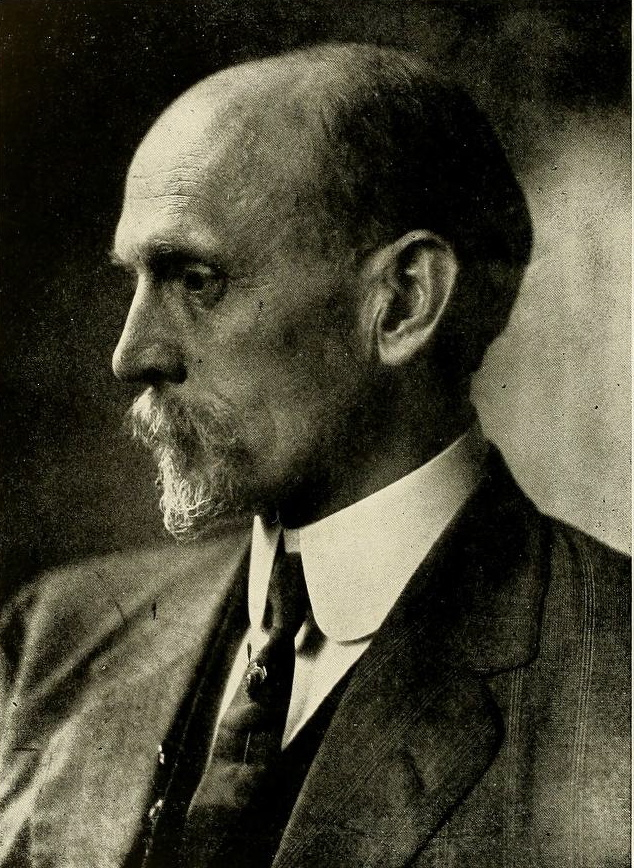
- Woodward in 1916
- Born: 1861; Seekonk, Massachusetts
- Died: 1939 (aged 77–78); New Orleans, Louisiana
- Occupations: Artist, art educator
- Known for: Newcomb Pottery
- Relatives: William Woodward (brother)

Ellsworth Woodward (1861–1939) was an American artist and art educator. During the late 19th century in New Orleans, Ellsworth and his older brother William Woodward were two of the most influential figures in Southern art. Ellsworth was born 1861 in Seekonk, Massachusetts, but the two brothers made New Orleans their home (around 1876) and devoted themselves to promoting Southern culture and art as artists, teachers and administrators. Ellsworth Woodward is best known for founding the Newcomb Pottery movement, and for his landscape-structure, genre, etcher.

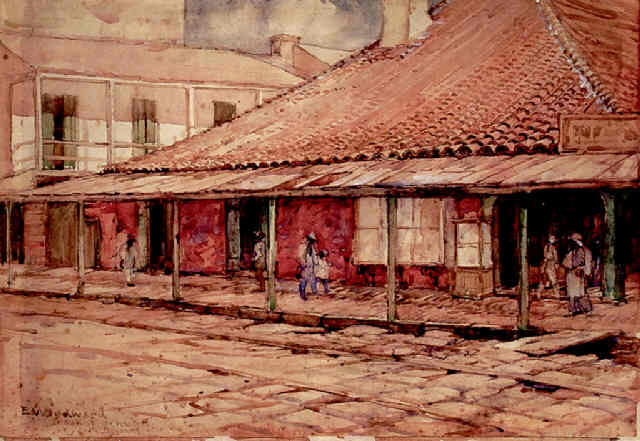
"Ursuline and Chartres", Ellsworth Woodward painting of corner in the French Quarter of New Orleans

== Biography ==
Woodward was born in 1861 in Seekonk, Massachusetts, and died in 1939 in New Orleans, Louisiana, where he spent the majority of his adult life. He studied art at the Rhode Island School of Design, and later in the studios of Carl von Marr, Samuel Richards, and Richard Fehr. From 1887 to 1931, he was a member of the art department faculty at Tulane University.

== Museums ==
Woodward's work is in the Charleston Museum, The Brooklyn Museum of Art, Lauren Rogers Museum of Art, Louisiana State University Museum of Art, Morris Museum of Art, Museum of Fine Arts, Houston, the Ogden Museum of Southern Art, and the Newcomb Art Gallery.

== Painting discovered by Goodwill ==
In 2009, an employee of Goodwill Industries in Nashville, Tennessee discovered a Woodward painting that was about to be discarded in a trash bin. The painting was auctioned online and sold for $8,000.

== Gallery ==
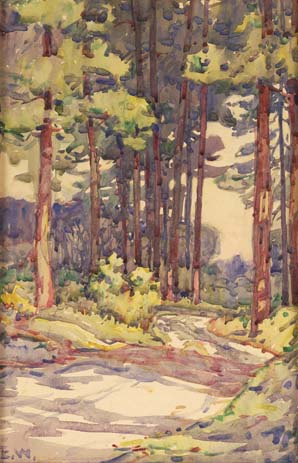
Abita Springs, 1931 (Ogden Museum of Southern Art)

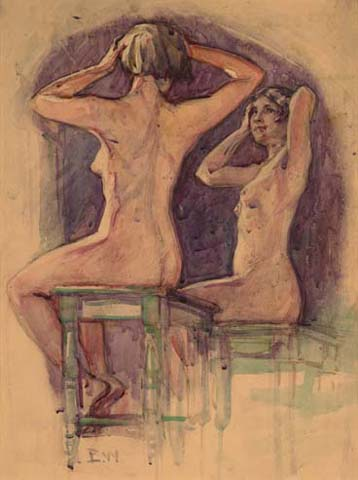
Female Nude in Mirror, 1900 (Ogden Museum of Southern Art)

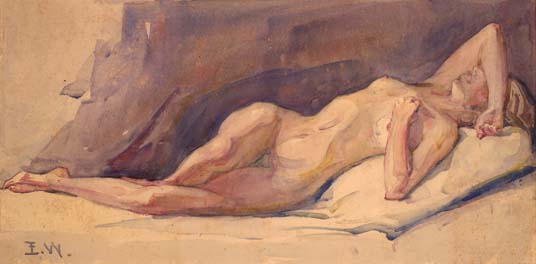
Female Nude, 1920 (Ogden Museum of Southern Art)

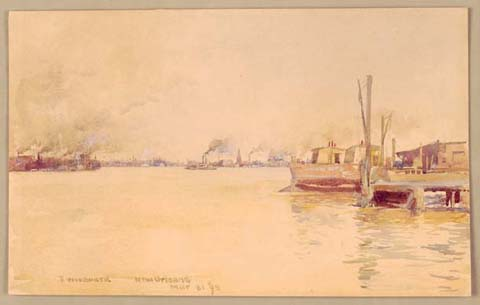
New Orleans Skyline, 1893 (Ogden Museum of Southern Art)

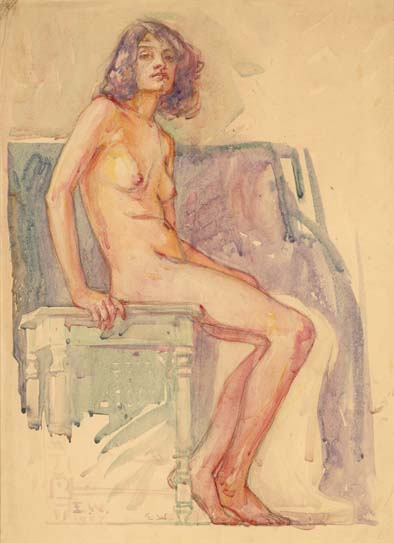
Seated Female Nude, 1927 (Ogden Museum of Southern Art)

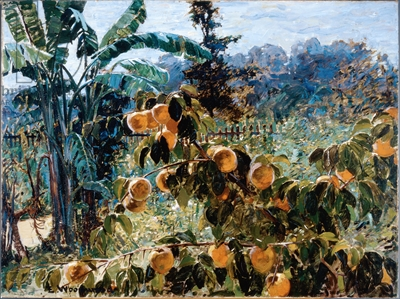
Backyard in Covington, 1930s

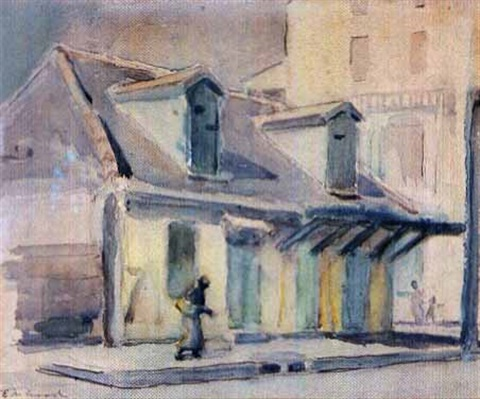
Lafitte's Blacksmith Shop, late 1910s-1930s
