= Poésie =

Poésie (plural poésies), meaning 'poem' in French, may refer to:

- Poésies (Rimbaud), poems written by Arthur Rimbaud between 1869 and 1873
- Poésies (Mallarmé collection), an 1887 poetry collection by Stéphane Mallarmé

== See also ==
- Poésie Noire, Belgian band that rose to prominence in the mid-1980s
- Poesy (disambiguation)
- Poesie, a series by Titian
