= Posy (given name) =

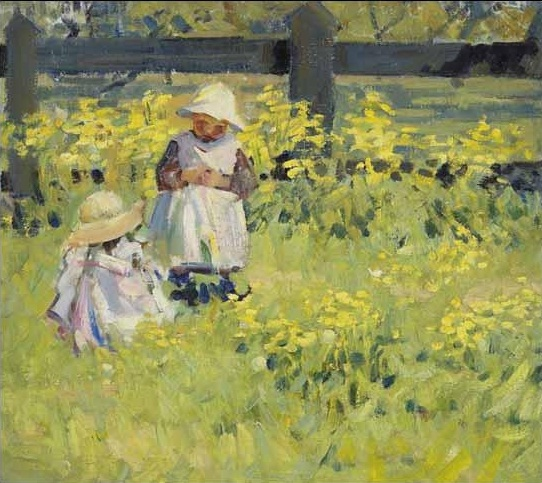
- Making posies by Helen McNiccoll, 1910. One meaning of the name Posy is nosegay.
- Gender: Unisex
- Language: English

Origin
- Meaning: Single flower or nosegay or diminutive of Josephine.

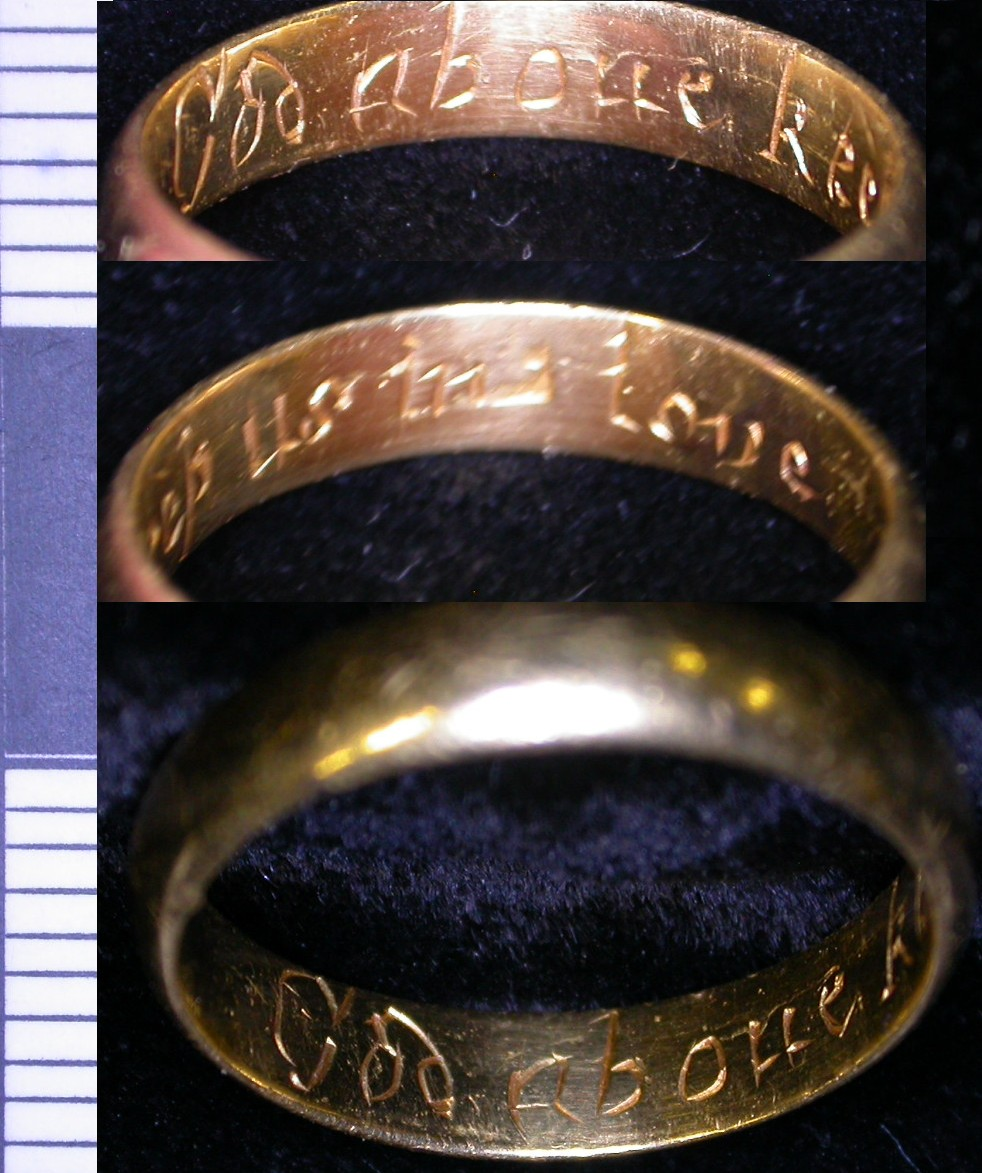
A post-medieval gold posie ring found in Leicestershire, England. Dated between 1600 and 1800, it is inscribed "God above keep us in love."

Posy or Posey or Posie is an English given name derived from the English term for a small flower bouquet. A posy is also a word for a single flower. It can also be derived from an English nickname, sometimes used independently, for a formal name such as Josephine. The name came into use along with other botanical names for girls in the 1800s. It has also been associated with poesy, referring to a collection of verses. A posie ring is a gold ring with a meaningful verse on its surface. They were exchanged by lovers as a symbol of commitment from the 1500s. Other spelling variants in use include Posee and Posi.

Posey is also a surname with various possible English, French, and German etymological origins.

Notable people and characters with the name include:

== Women ==
- Posie Graeme-Evans, Australian novelist, television and film producer, editor, screenwriter and director.
- Kellie-Jay Keen-Minshull, also known as Posie Parker, British anti-transgender rights activist and founder of the group Standing for Women
- Posy Miller (died 2002), British actress
- Rosamund “Posy” Musgrave (born 1986), British former cross-country skier
- Posy Simmonds (born 1945), British newspaper cartoonist, writer and illustrator

== Men ==
- Posey G. Lester (1850–1929), American politician
- Posey Rorer (1891–1936), American old-time fiddler

== Fictional characters ==
- Posy Fossil, a character in the children's novel Ballet Shoes by Noel Streatfeild
- Posey, a character in BBC children's television programme The Flumps
- Posy Reilling, a character in the book series Bridgerton (novel series) and the Netflix show Bridgerton portrayed by Isabella Wei as Posy Li.

== See also ==
- Pusai (died 344), Christian martyr also known as Posi
