= Josefine =

Josefine is a feminine given name. Notable people with the name include:

- Josefine Balluck, Austrian actress with dwarfism who played a Munchkin in The Wizard of Oz
- Josefine Brunner (1909–1943), Austrian socialist, resistance member and victim of the Nazi regime
- Josefine Cronholm (born 1971), Swedish jazz singer and songwriter
- Josefine Einsle, German curler in the 1980s and '90s
- Josefine Engström, Swedish ski-orienteering competitor and world champion
- Josefine Lindstrand (born 1981), Swedish singer
- Josefine Öqvist (born 1983), Swedish former footballer
- Josefine Paul (born 1982), German politician
- Josefine Preuß (born 1986), German actress
- Josefine Ridell (born 1997), Swedish singer in the 2010 Junior Eurovision Song Contest

== See also ==
- Josephine (disambiguation)
- Josefin, a given name
