= Posey Township, Indiana =

Posey Township is the name of seven townships in the U.S. state of Indiana:

- Posey Township, Clay County, Indiana
- Posey Township, Fayette County, Indiana
- Posey Township, Franklin County, Indiana
- Posey Township, Harrison County, Indiana
- Posey Township, Rush County, Indiana
- Posey Township, Switzerland County, Indiana
- Posey Township, Washington County, Indiana
