= William Woodward (artist) =

American painter

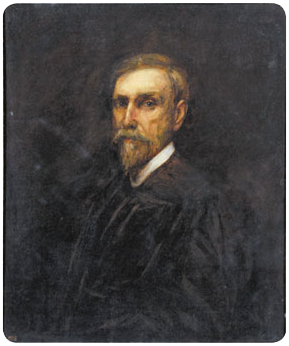
- Self-portrait
- Born: May 1, 1859; Seekonk, Massachusetts, US
- Died: November 17, 1939 (aged 80); New Orleans, Louisiana, US
- Resting place: Biloxi, Mississippi, US
- Education: Rhode Island School of Design; Massachusetts Art Normal School
- Occupations: Painter, university professor
- Employer: Tulane University
- Relatives: Ellsworth Woodward (brother)

William Woodward (May 1, 1859 – November 17, 1939) was a U.S. artist and educator, best known for his impressionist paintings of New Orleans and the Gulf Coast of the United States.

== Biography ==
=== Early life ===
William Woodward was born on May 1, 1859, in Seekonk, Massachusetts. His younger brother Ellsworth Woodward also became a notable artist.

As a youth, he was accustomed to the rural landscape and the close proximity of family and relatives. His family was supportive of his interest in art, an interest he attributed to an uncle, his mother's brother, who had been killed in the American Civil War when he was a small child. In his biographical note, he wrote of his Uncle George, "unmarried and seems to be the first in the family to develop art tendencies, producing crayon portraits of family members including one of my mother, which had much to do in causing me to turn to art for a life work." His interest in art intensified after a visit to the 1876 Philadelphia Centennial Exposition where he and his younger brother saw art exhibitions. After this exposure to fine art, he began an intense seven years of continuous art training. He undertook studies at the Rhode Island School of Design, newly established in response to the Philadelphia Exposition and based on the indivisible relationship of art to industry. In preparation for a teaching career, he also studied at the Massachusetts Art Normal School, where his interest in architecture began.

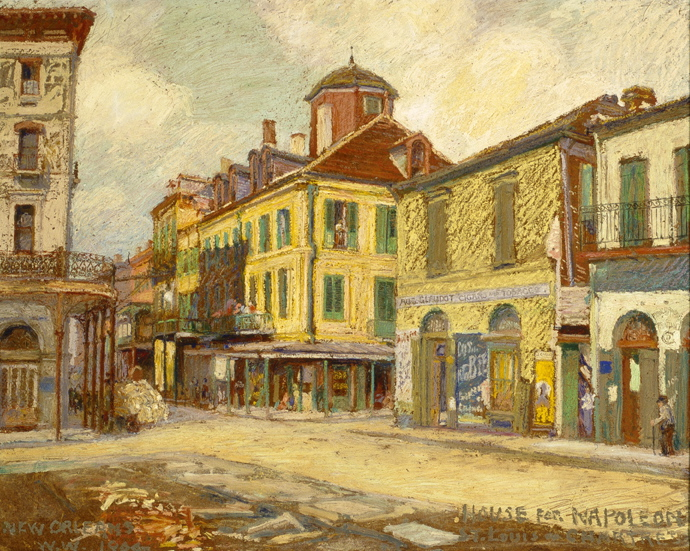
View of the Napoleon House in New Orleans, 1904

=== Career ===
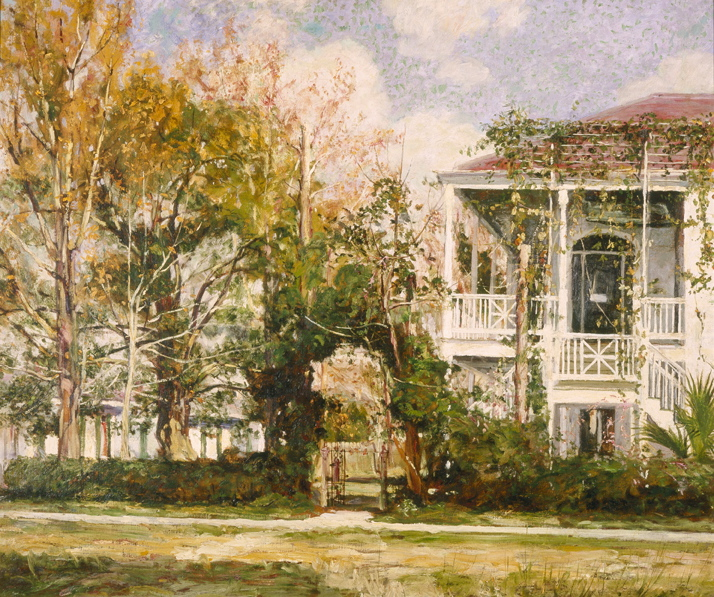
William Woodward painting of a house in the Carrollton section of New Orleans, 1899.

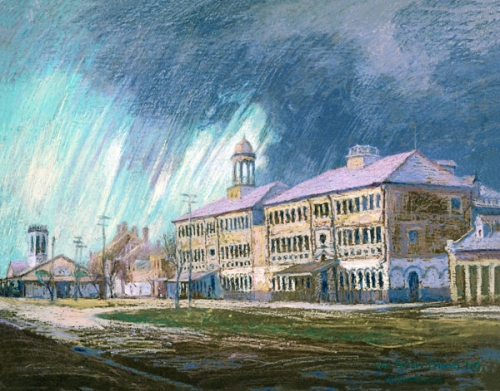
Old Parish Prison and Treme Market, 1887

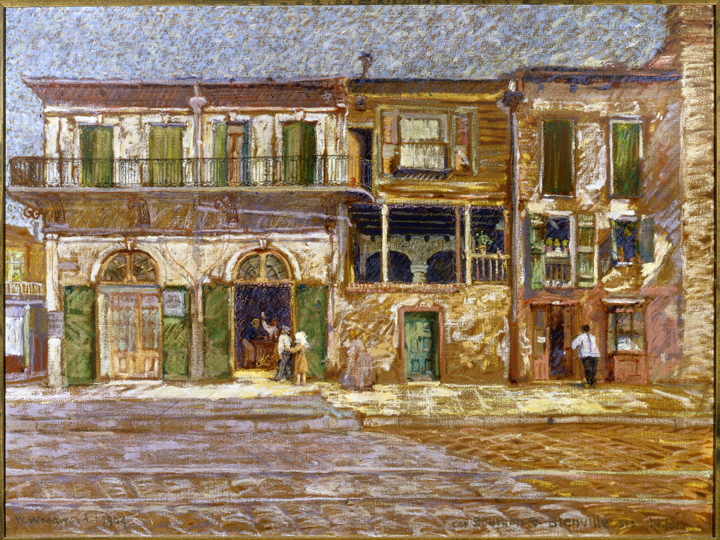
Old Absinthe House, 1904

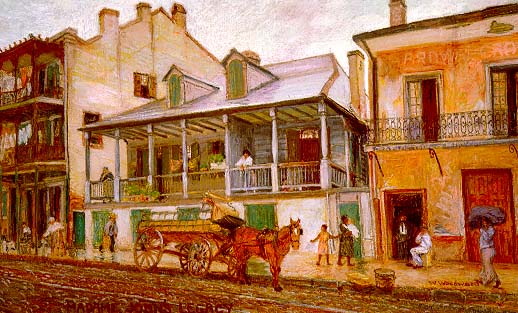
Madame John's Legacy, c. 1910

In 1884, William Preston Johnston (1831–1899) recruited him to teach fine arts, mechanical drawing, and architectural drawing at Tulane University. Woodward, who had taught at the School of Design while still a student, was also a student-teacher at the Art Normal School, a position he resigned before departing for New Orleans. Continuing his studies by correspondence, he graduated in 1886. That year, he also extended his honeymoon through Scotland and England to include a three-month summer study at the Académie Julian in Paris. This sojourn provided a new direction for his artistic development, for there he saw Impressionist works, a style he soon adapted to his architectural scenes.

His impression of the multicultural Vieux Carré in a crescent of the Mississippi River provided lifelong artistic inspiration. Unlike the wide-open spaces of his youth, the Quarter was crowded with European-style residences alongside docks, open air markets, dry goods stores, and hardware stores, all located in the shadow of St. Louis Cathedral on the city's main square. His impressionistic views of the Vieux Carré were paramount in focusing attention on the historical structures, many of which were being recklessly destroyed. In 1895, he was in the forefront of the movement against the demolition of The Cabildo, the seat of government during the Spanish Colonial period, rebuilt after the 1794 fire and one of the few surviving structures of the colonial era. This battle for historic preservation in the French Quarter ultimately led to the establishment of the Vieux Carré Commission.

He was the first artist to focus intensely on the Vieux Carré "before it was fashionable," documenting the city's rich cultural heritage in vignettes of daily lifeÑstreet cleaners, milkmaids driving drayage carts, women at market, and residents otherwise engaged in their daily routines. These scenes have been said to "rank as his best of the urban fabric of New Orleans." He assimilated Impressionist tenets with his own style and ultimately developed a manner of artistic rendering suitable for capturing the soft light, moisture, and romantic essence of the French Quarter. His palette lightened and the contours of figures and architecture softened. His figures, which are imbued with a sense of immediacy, enliven his architectural scenes.

He was active in every facet of architecture, including planning for Tulane's new buildings and the disposition of interior rooms and studios. Upon the organization of the College of Technology, Woodward was appointed Professor of Drawing and Architecture, and worked incessantly toward the establishment of a school of architecture, "to introduce in this region an awareness of professional values in design, and especially to provide exercises in the skills of mechanical, freehand and architectural drawing." Woodward's goal was ultimately achieved in 1907 when Tulane formally established the School of Architecture.

Additionally, he chaired the Art Committee of the Artists' Association of New Orleans, and thus spoke with the authority of both positions. Allison Owen, Woodward's former student who continued architectural studies in Boston, supported passage of a city ordinance to establish the Cabildo as a museum. With this successful movement, Woodward's preservationist activities began, as did the preservationist movement in the Vieux Carré. As Woodward, who reportedly "set up on street corners or mid-street," documented the historic quarter, his awareness of historic preservation increased accordingly. His observance of the ambiance of the Quarter is manifest in his earliest works, particularly an 1891 gouache and watercolor painting, French Quarter Market. His concern for architectural preservation is also evident in the appearance of Jackson Square in his view of the Cabildo from St. Peter Street. One sees beyond the arches of the loggia into the greenery of the Square, the equestrian statue of Andrew Jackson, to the lower Pontalba Building and an outbuilding that no longer exists. Woodward printed the name of the Cabildo in block letters to underscore the historical importance of the structure, a device he used in another image of the Cabildo's gate.

=== Later career ===
Among his students were the most respected practicing architects of the day: Richard Koch, Ernest Lee Jahncke, Edgar Stone, and Emile Weil, as well as Charles Bein, Frederick Duncan "Fritz" Parham, and Alvin Callender, the latter two who assisted Woodward in documenting the features and dimensions of the St. Louis Hotel while it was being demolished in 1917. Callender, after whom Alvin A. Callender Air Field was named, was killed in World War I. Woodward painted the young aviator's portrait posthumously, using photographs and including the airplane in which Callender crashed, with its propeller serving to mark his grave.

In his retirement, he continued his preservationist activities. His discovery of a plastic plate, Fiberloid, as a matrix for printmaking suited his soft-focused street scenes. Within five years he executed 115 etchings, which were then printed by his brother, Ellsworth. In 1938, he published French Quarter Etchings, reproducing fifty-four architectural views with annotations regarding history, renovation, and destruction of the structures. Many of his paintings, drawings, and etchings record historic landmarks that were no longer standing at the time of the publication. Another of Woodward's legacies comes through the 1964 posthumous publication of a small guide book, Early Views of the Vieux Carré A Guide to the French Quarter, which illustrates thirty-three of his architectural drawings and etchings. This spiral-bound guidebook, which sold out before it was released, ultimately sold over thirty thousand copies.

=== Personal life ===
In 1886, he married Louise Amelia Giesen (1862-1937) of Kenner, Louisiana. They had four children:

- Alma Louise Woodward (1887-1939+). She married William Bainbridge Logan.
- Eleanor Woodward (1889-1939+). She married Clarence Blosser and later George C. Moseley.
- William Giesen Woodward (1892-1939+).
- Carl Ellsworth Woodward (1894-1972). He married Mollie Holland (1894-1967).

While painting a mural for the United Fruit Company in New Orleans in 1921, Woodward fell off a scaffold and injured his spine, resulting in permanent paralysis of the legs. Woodward and his wife retired to Biloxi, Mississippi, in 1923. Using a wheelchair, Woodward remained active, and his retirement years were filled with prolific artwork, travel around the United States in a specially-equipped automobile, and his work as founder of the Mississippi Gulf Coast Art Association. He died at Southern Baptist Hospital in New Orleans on November 17, 1939.

== Secondary source ==
- Hinckley, Robert. William Woodward: American Impressionist, Jackson, Mississippi: University Press of Mississippi, 2009.
