= Josephine McGill =

American composer, music historian and folksong collector (1877–1919)

Josephine McGill (20 October 1877 – 24 February 1919) was an American composer, music historian and folksong collector.

== Life ==
Josephine McGill was born in Louisville (Kentucky), the second daughter of Benjamin Harding McGill (1834–1878) and his wife Bridgett (née Corcoran) (born 1845 in Ireland). After attending and graduating from Presentation Academy and Louisville Girls High School, McGill studied piano, organ and vocal music in New York. She devoted her career to composition and the study of music.

She wrote the book Folk Songs of the Kentucky Mountains, first published in 1917, then reprinted in 1922, 1926 and 1937, after collecting and transcribing folksongs in Knott and Letcher counties in 1914.

McGill died at the age of 41 at her mother's home, after being ill for several weeks.

== Works (selection) ==
- Duna: Song, in E♭, New York: Boosey & Co., 1914; to words by Marjorie Pickthall. OCLC 26781429
- Pierrot, New York: Luckhardt & Belder, 1914; to words by Sara Teasdale. OCLC 19798740
- Folk Songs of the Kentucky Mountains: Twenty traditional ballads and other English folk-songs, New York: Boosey, 1917; with an introductory note by Henry Edward Krehbiel. OCLC 968596
- A Road song, New York: Boosey & Co., 1922; to words by Madison Cawein. OCLC 25464127
- O sleep, New York: G. Schirmer, 1927; to words by Grace F. Norton. OCLC 14757881
- Thine eternal peace: sacred songs, New York: G. Schirmer, 1936; organ accompaniment by Carl Weinrich. OCLC 37158985
