= Posey House =

Posey House may refer to:

- Posey House, Corydon, Indiana, a historic house within Corydon Historic District
- John V. G. Posey House, Portland, Oregon, listed on the National Register
