= Josephine Moon =

Australian novelist

- Occupation: Writer
- Children: 1
- Writing career
- Years active: 2014–present
- Website: josephinemoon.com

Josephine Moon is an Australian author, based in Cooroy, Queensland. She has worked as an English teacher and editor. She has a Bachelor of Communications. She changed to a writing career after having Chronic fatigue syndrome.

== Career ==
Her first novel, The Tea Chest, was set in Brisbane and focused on tea-rooms and was inspired by the interior of the Chermside T2 specialty tea shop. The book was launched at the Cooroy Library in April 2014. In conjunction with the release of her tea-themed book, Moon supported the Cancer Council Australia's Biggest Morning Tea with a virtual Twitter fundraiser in May 2014.

The Tea Chest was reviewed by Jessica Broadbent in Books+Publishing as very readable but with many different aspects of the story, as the narration rotates from character to character and between time periods. Kerryn Goldsworthy's review in The Sydney Morning Herald noted the familiar premise of "...a group of plucky women with problems get together to run a business...", but that of its kind, the book is well-written with lush and detailed descriptions.

Maree Field's review of The Tea Chest considered the cosy novel's three main characters as likeable and relatable, within the framework of an engaging story. Ann-Maree Lourey considered that it took a while to acclimatise to the book, but that it became very readable.

Moon's second novel, The Chocolate Promise (variously published as, The Chocolate Apothecary), was reviewed by Amy Vuleta in Books+Publishing as a Tasmanian twist on the movie Chocolat. She highlighted Christmas Livingston as a well-rounded central character, with the novel being a relatable and light addition to contemporary women's fiction.

Moon's third novel, The Beekeeper's Secret, was reviewed by Kerryn Goldsworthy as having the same outline as the previous two novels, with strong female characters overcoming adversity whilst establishing niche businesses. Goldsworthy noted that while the books are typical of commercial fiction's easy readability and mild sentimentality, The Beekeeper's Secret has a darker tone, set with a background of the Royal Commission into Institutional Responses to Child Sexual Abuse. Goldsworthy considered that Moon was "agile and even-handed" in her treatment of the church in the book.

== Personal life ==
Moon is Autistic and ADHD and advocates for better understanding of neurodivergence. She lives near Cooroy with her husband, son and animals including goats, horses and chickens. Along with other Australian female authors Frances Whiting, Susan Johnson and Kim Wilkins, she was interviewed for a 2016 ABC Regional News article about how creativity can co-exist with parenting and work responsibilities.

== Works ==
- The Tea Chest, Allen & Unwin, 2014 (ISBN 978-1-74331-787-7)
- The Chocolate Promise, Allen & Unwin, 2015 (ISBN 978-1-76029-252-2)
- The Beekeeper's Secret, Allen & Unwin, 2016 (ISBN 978-1-925266-13-9)
- Three Gold Coins, Allen & Unwin, 2018 (ISBN 978-1-925266-14-6)
- The Gift of Life, Penguin Books Australia, 2019 (ISBN 978-1-76089-361-3)
- The Cake Maker's Wish, Penguin Books Australia, 2020 (ISBN 978-1-76104-188-4)
- The Jam Queens, Penguin Books Australia, 2021 (ISBN 978-1-76104-852-4
- The Wonderful Thing About Phoenix Rose, Penguin Books Australia, 2023 (ISBN 978-1-76104-620-9)
