= Josephine Robinson Roe =

American mathematician (1858–1946)

- Born: Josephine Alberta Robinson; May 5, 1858; Meredith, New Hampshire
- Died: April 29, 1946 (aged 87); Newton, Massachusetts
- Education: Oberlin College; Dartmouth College; Syracuse University
- Occupations: Educator, mathematician
- Spouse: Edward Drake Roe

Josephine Robinson Roe (May 5, 1858 – April 29, 1946) was an American mathematician and university professor. In 1918, she was the first woman to receive a doctorate in mathematics from Syracuse University, and one of the few American women to earn a PhD in mathematics before World War II.

== Biography ==
Josephine Alberta Robinson was born in Meredith, New Hampshire, to Frances Eliza Weld and Joseph Wadleigh Robinson, who was a farmer. Josephine graduated from the New Hampton Literary Institution in 1880 and taught in New Hampshire schools for more than a decade before entering college. Her early teaching assignments included teaching public district schools in New Hampshire for about 15 months, high school principal in Laconia, New Hampshire from 1880 to 1882, and teaching at her alma mater New Hampton Literary Institution.

In 1890 she began studying mathematics at Oberlin College in Ohio, at age 32, and received a bachelor's degree in mathematics in 1894. She then taught Latin at Kimball Union Academy in Meriden, New Hampshire. In 1897 she was appointed to Berea College in Kentucky, where she taught Latin, English literature and mathematics. At Berea she held a series of positions including director of the women's department and acting professor of mathematics from 1897 to 1901, dean of women from 1901 to 1907 and professor of mathematics from 1901 to 1911. During the summer months of 1907 to 1911, she studied at Dartmouth College and it was there that she earned her master's degree in mathematics in 1911.

In that same year, she married the widower Edward Drake Roe and left Berea College to study mathematics at Syracuse University where her husband was a math professor. In 1918, at the age of 60, she became the first female PhD student at Syracuse to receive her doctorate in mathematics with the dissertation: Interfunctional Expressibility Problems Symmetric Functions. Her research was directed by her husband, E.D. Roe.

She taught as an assistant professor at Syracuse University and was a member of various mathematical organizations in addition to the American Astronomical Society, in acknowledgment of her research assistance to her husband at a private observatory he built behind their home.

Josephine Robinson Roe died April 29, 1946 in Newton, Massachusetts, just a few days before she would have turned 88.

== Memberships ==
According to Green, Roe belonged to several professional organizations.

- American Mathematical Society
- American Astronomical Society
- American Association for the Advancement of Science
- Phi Beta Kappa
- Sigma Xi
