= Josephine Amelia Perkins =

British horse thief and prisoner

Josephine Amelia Perkins (c. 1818 in Devonshire – ?) was a British horse thief and prisoner. She wrote The Female Prisoner: A Narrative of the Life and Singular Adventures Of Josephine Amelia Perkins and A Demon in Female Apparel: Narrative of the Notorious Female Horse Thief, Again in Prison and For Life. In 1839, Perkins was the first woman convicted of horse stealing.

== Career ==
According to her autobiographical pamphlets, with these details not backed up by any other sources, she stole her father's horse to elope with a navy purser at the age of 17. Unfortunately, when she arrived in Portsmouth after 117 miles, his boat had already left, so she sold the horse and embarked on a ship to Quebec. This ship was wrecked at sea, but the passengers were saved and eventually shipped to Wilmington, North Carolina. There, Perkin soon was arrested for stealing a horse, but a jury acquitted Perkins because they did not believe a woman was capable of the crime. She left to South Carolina, where she was arrested and acquitted for horsetheft, changed her name to Sarah Steward. Back in North Carolina, Perkins was again arrested and was subsequently sentenced to two years in the state penitentiary in Madison County. After this she published her first autobiographical pamphlet (1839). A few years later she was caught a last time, now for horsetheft, burglary, and shooting at an officer, and was sentenced for life. During that sentence she published her second pamphlet in 1843.
