= Posey, West Virginia =

Posey
- Unincorporated community
- Location within the state of West Virginia Posey (the United States)
- Coordinates: 37°48′13″N 81°25′57″W
- Country: United States
- State: West Virginia
- County: Raleigh
- Elevation: 1,837 ft (560 m)
- Time zone: UTC-5 (Eastern (EST))
  - Summer (DST): UTC-4 (EDT)
- GNIS ID: 1555396

Posey is an unincorporated community in Raleigh County, West Virginia, United States.

The community was named after Posey Hurst, according to local history.
