= Josephine Adreon =

American painter (1844–1911)

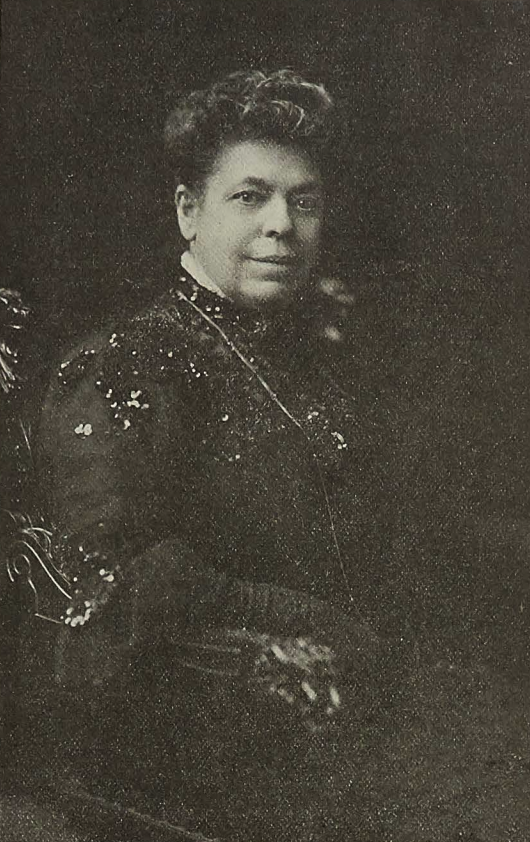
- Born: July 19, 1844; Pittsburgh, Pennsylvania, U.S.
- Died: December 21, 1911 (aged 67); Saint Louis, Missouri, U.S.
- Resting place: Bellefontaine Cemetery
- Spouse: Edward L. Adreon (m. 1871)
- Children: E. L. Adreon, Jr.

Josephine L. Adreon (née Young; July 19, 1844 – December 21, 1911) was an American landscape painter active in Saint Louis, Missouri from c. 1871 to 1911.

== Life ==
Adreon was born on July 19, 1844 in Pittsburgh, Pennsylvania, to William P. and Minerva Woodward Young. She moved to St. Louis, Missouri in 1868 where she trained under the well-known landscape painter Joseph Rusling Meeker after her marriage to Edward L. Adreon on December 23, 1871.

Adreon's works were inspired by landscapes across North America. She was known to have worked in the Rocky Mountains and near the Great Lakes in the summers and in Florida through the winter. A series of paintings of the Southland depict marshes and swamps in a romantic light. Of her "Marsh Landscape" #7, presumably depicting a southern swamp, an author wrote "its cloud interpretation is worthy the brush of one of the modern Dutch masters."

Her works were exhibited twice by the St. Louis Exposition and Music Hall Association, in 1885 and 1887, and once at the Saint Louis Exposition, in 1881. Although Adreon did not exhibit her work frequently, she was a prominent member of St. Louis society and her works were on display for viewing in her home and studio at 5713 Cabanne Ave.

A posthumous description of Adreon's life and work was published in the December 18, 1914 issue of Reedy's Mirror under the title "Paintings of Mrs. Edward L. Adreon". On the death of Adreon's son and husband in 1913, the collection of paintings was passed down to the artist's grandson, Robert E. Adreon, who retained the works in situ in the family house.

== Known works ==
Upon her death Adreon had 72 extant works in oil, watercolor and "on china." The works were numbered in a private catalogue and labels with corresponding numbers can be seen in the lower right corner of paintings in photographs of the Adreon house.

- "Northern Forest" #1
- "Magnolia" #2
- "Western Sunset–A No. 1" #3
- "Passing Star" #5
- "Marsh Landscape" #7
- "Psyche" #8
- "Portrait Artist's Fancy" #9
- "Morning in Tropics (after Church)" #10
- "Norwegian Waterfall" #14
- "Southern Swamp" #15
- "Landscape" #16
- "Study in Animal Life" #17
- Adirondak Woods #32
- "Flowers" #33
- "Near Sulphur Springs, Mo." #43
- "Moonlight in Tropica" #45
- "Forest Swamp"
- "On Piasa Bluff" - painted on china and fired
- “Western Sunset"

Great Lakes Works

- "Scene on Nipigore" #12
- "Wequetonsing" - watercolor

The Southland Works

- "Southern Swamp" #4
- "Indian Dawn in Forest" #11
- Unknown #20
- Unknown #38
- Unknown #39
- "Lake and Forest" #40
- "Southern Swamp" #42
