= Josephine Frigge =

Swedish footballer (born 1993)

Personal information
- Date of birth: 3 October 1993 (age 33)
- Place of birth: The Hague, Netherlands
- Height: 5 ft 6 in (1.68 m)
- Position: Goalkeeper

Team information
- Current team: IF Brommapojkarna
- Number: 1

Youth career
- Borgeby FK

College career
Years	Team	Apps	(Gls)
2012-2013	Lindsey Wilson College	22	(0)

Senior career*
Years	Team	Apps	(Gls)
2013-2017	IF Limhamn Bunkeflo	78	(0)
2018	FC Rosengård	0	(0)
2019-2022	IF Brommapojkarna	37	(0)
2023–2024	Hammarby IF	0	(0)
- * Club domestic league appearances and goals as of 22:24, 21 November 2024 (UTC) ‡ National team caps and goals as of 17:03, 4 January 2020 (UTC)

Josephine Frigge (born 3 October 1993) is a Swedish football goalkeeper of Dutch descent who played for IF Brommapojkarna of the Elitettan and Hammarby Fotboll of the Damallsvenskan.

== Club career ==
Frigge played at Borgeby FK in her youth years and played in the United States at Lindsey Wilson College Blue Raiders in 2012. In college she won the 2012 NAIA Championship. She made the switch to the 2nd Swedish level in 2013 when joining IF Limhamn Bunkeflo. On 29 July 2015 in a match against IFK Kalmar, Frigge broke her leg to be out until the end of the 2015 season.

Josephine Frigge made her debut in the Swedish Damallsvenskan against FC Rosengård in 2017 in the derby with 7825 attendance in Malmö New Stadium.

In 2017 her contract with Limhamn Bunkeflo expired, and in February 2018 she joined the ten-time Swedish champions FC Rosengård.

Before the 2019 season, Frigge joined the Elitettan club IF Brommapojkarna. In March 2023, she signed a one-year contract with Hammarby IF.
