= Josephine Højbjerg =

Danish actress (born 2003)

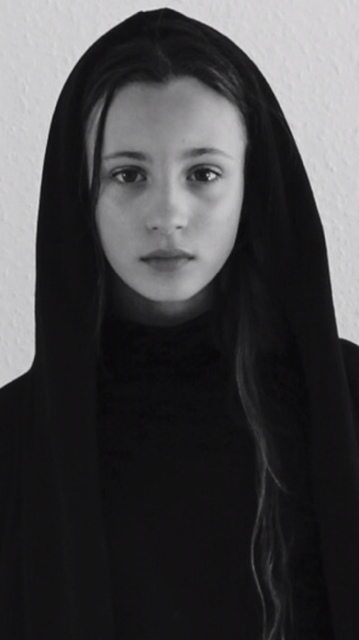
- Højbjerg in 2017
- Born: Josephine Chavarria Højbjerg; 14 January 2003 (age 23); Bornholm, Denmark
- Occupation: Actor
- Years active: 2012–present

Josephine Chavarria Højbjerg (born 14 January 2003) is a Danish actress. At the age of nine, she made her acting debut in the DR series Pendlerkids, and later received national recognition for her role as Tinka in the TV 2 shows Tinkas juleeventyr, Tinka og Kongespillet, and Tinka og Sjælens Spejl.

== Early life ==
Højbjerg grew up on Bornholm with her mother and older brother. She is a quarter Costa Rican through her maternal grandfather. She completed her secondary education in 2022.

== Career ==
Højbjerg's acting debut came as a child when she appeared in all three seasons of the DR series Pendlerkids from 2012 to 2014, playing the character Pil. Her mother saw a casting call from DR and submitted her for the role. During the nine weeks of filming, she stayed with her uncle in Copenhagen.

In 2015, Højbjerg appeared in the third season of The Bridge as Karen, the role of Julie in the DR Ultra Christmas show Bubber's Juleshow, and played Sara in two seasons of the DR Ultra series Klassen. The following year, she appeared alongside Mette Horn in four educational films for the Dansk Center for Undervisningsmiljø, and in December, she appeared as Emma in the SEAS-NVE campaign "Use Energy Wisely."

Højbjerg's national breakthrough came in 2017 when she played the lead role of Tinka in TV 2's Tinkas juleeventyr. This role later led to an appearance in a sequel, Tinka og Kongespillet, released in 2019. In 2020, she was awarded with the Svendprisen for her performance as Tinka. She later played Tinka for a third time in 2022 in Tinka og Sjælens Spejl, where she also played Tinka's twin Flora.

Højbjerg made her film debut in 2019 in the drama film Hacker, playing the female lead character Savannah.

Højbjerg starred in the controversial Danish television show Alle elsker Rasmus in 2026. In the program, comedian Rasmus Wallbridge was observed and filmed for months without his knowledge, including in private moments. The broadcast triggered a fierce debate in Denmark about public bullying and the ethical boundaries of media entertainment.

== Filmography ==
=== Film ===
Year	Film	Role	Ref
2019	Hacker	Savannah	
2025	Mango	Agnes	

== Awards and nominations ==
Year	Award	Category	Nominated Work	Result	Ref
2020	Svendprisen	Danish Actor of the Year in a TV drama series	Tinka og Kongespillet	Won	
