= Posie ring =

Gold finger ring with a short inscription

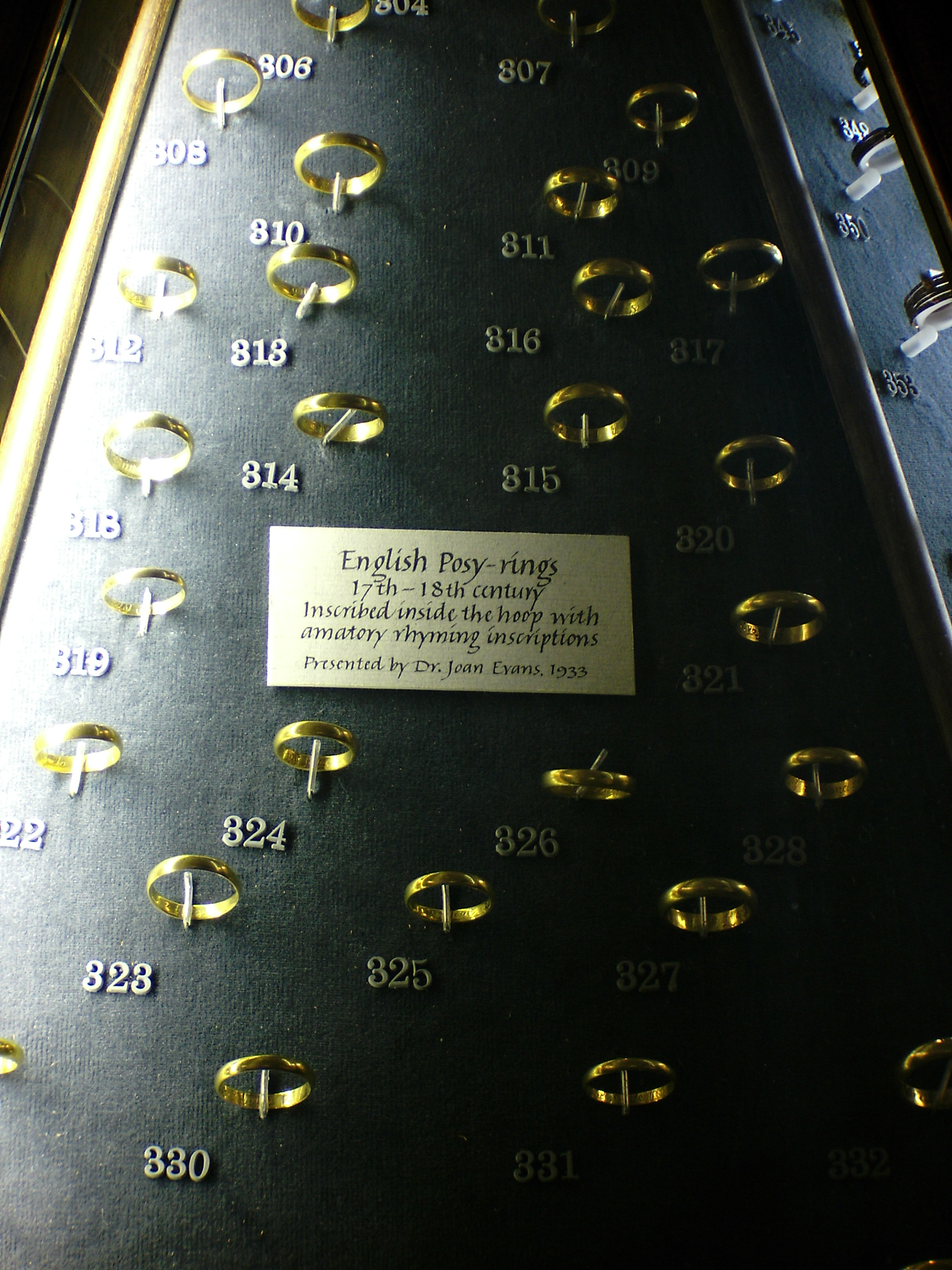
Part of the Ashmolean collection

Posie rings (sometimes spelled posy, posey or poesy rings) are gold finger rings with a short inscription on their surface. They were popular during the 15th through the 17th centuries in both England and France as lovers' gifts. The language used in many early posy rings was Norman French, with French, Latin and English used in later times. The quotations were often from contemporary courtship stories or chapbooks and usually inscribed on the inner surface of the ring. The rings were also given to show regard or as a gift.

The Ashmolean Museum in Oxford, England, has a vast collection. The Victoria and Albert Museum in London also has a decently sized collection bequeathed by Joan Evans. She compiled a list of more than 3000 posies for her book English Posies and Posy Rings.

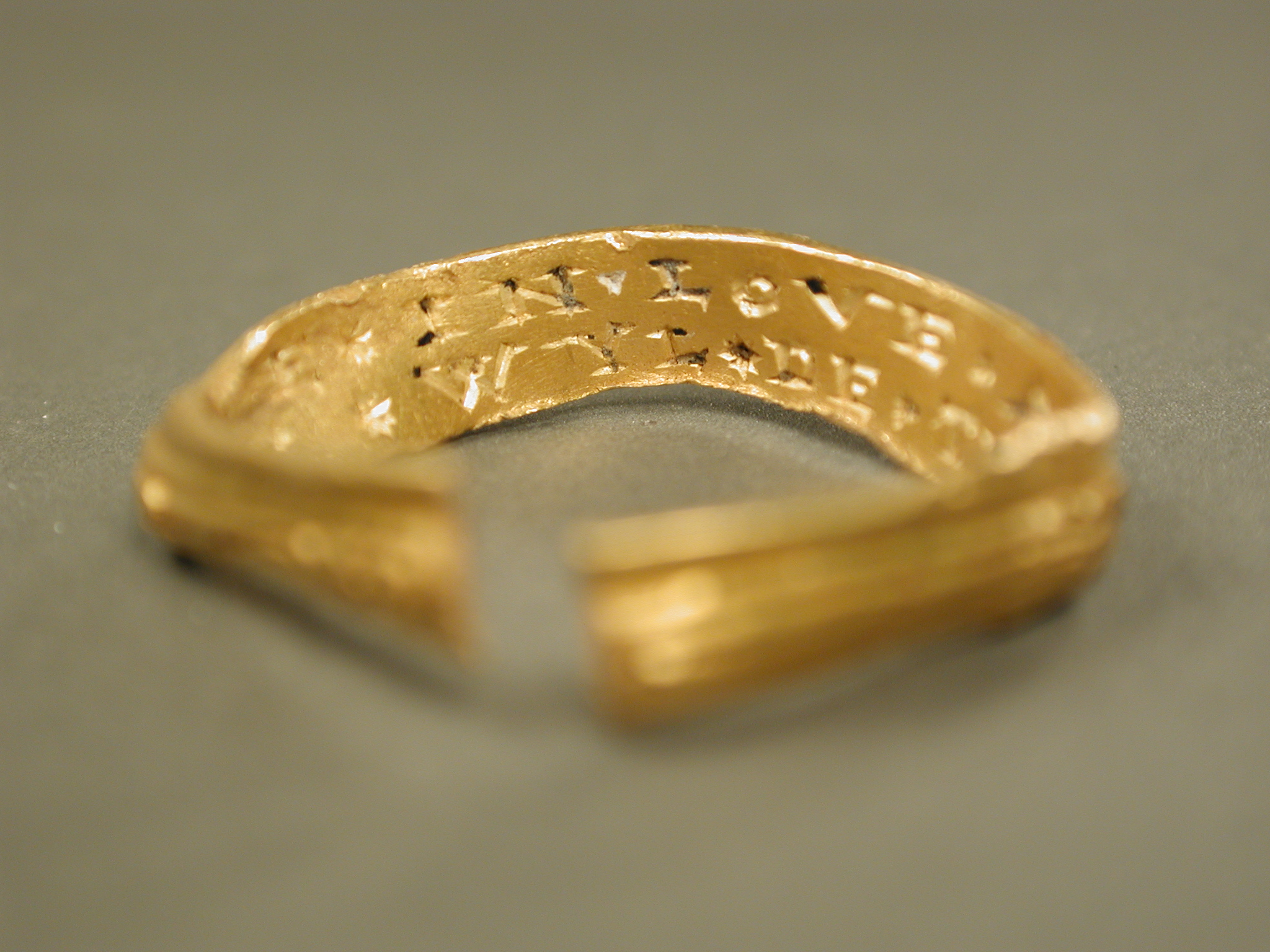
A gold posie ring found in Yorkshire
