= Posey (surname) =

Posey is an English-language surname most commonly found in North America.

Notable people with the surname include:

- Amanda Posey, British film producer
- Bill Posey, U.S. representative from Florida
- Buster Posey, Major League Baseball player
- Carnot Posey, Confederate general in the American Civil War
- Cumberland Posey, Negro league baseball owner
- Darrell A. Posey, ethnobiologist
- Francis B. Posey, Indiana lawyer and politician
- Hercules Posey, enslaved African owned by President George Washington
- James Posey, basketball player
- John Posey (actor), actor
- John Adams Posey, Indiana lawyer and politician
- John Wesley Posey, Indiana abolitionist
- Kailia Posey, American beauty pageant contestant
- Parker Posey (born 1968), American actress
- Parker McKenna Posey (born 1995), American actress
- Sam Posey, American racecar driver and sports broadcast journalist
- Sandy Posey, American singer
- Thomas Posey, 19th-century U.S. general and politician, namesake of Posey County, Indiana
- Travis Posey (born 1979), American mass shooter
- Tyler Posey (born 1991), American actor

== See also ==
- Posey (given name)
