= Giuseppina (given name) =

- Pronunciation: Italian: [dʒuzepˈpiːna]
- Gender: Female
- Language: Italian

Origin
- Region of origin: Italy

Other names
- Variant form: Giuseppa
- Nicknames: Pina, Giusy, Giusi, Geppa, Geppina, Beppa, Beppina, Peppa, Peppina, Pinella, Pinetta, Pinuccia
- Related names: Josie, Josephine, Giuseppe

Giuseppina is an Italian feminine given name. It is the Italian version of the English name Josephine. It has the alternative form Giuseppa and a number of hypocorisms.

== People ==
=== Giuseppina ===
- Giuseppina Aliverti (1894–1982), Italian geophysicist
- Giuseppina Bersani (1949–2023), Italian fencer
- Giuseppina Gabriela Bonino (1843–1906), Italian nun
- Giuseppina Bozzacchi (1853–1870), Italian ballerina
- Giuseppina Brambilla (1819–1903), Italian contralto
- Giuseppina Catanea (1894–1948), Italian nun
- Giuseppina Cattani (1859–1914), Italian microbiologist
- Giuseppina Cirulli (born 1959), Italian hurdler
- Giuseppina Cobelli (1898–1948), Italian soprano
- Giuseppina d'Agostino, Canadian lawyer
- Giuseppina Di Blasi (born 1979), Italian archer
- Giuseppina Finzi-Magrini (1878–1944), Italian soprano
- Giuseppina Gargano (1853–1939), Italian soprano
- Giuseppina Grassi (born 1976), Mexican cyclist
- Giuseppina Grassi (athlete) (born 1957), Sammarinese athlete
- Giuseppina Grassini (1773–1850), Italian contralto
- Giuseppina Huguet (1871–1951), Spanish soprano
- Giuseppina Leone (born 1934), Italian athlete
- Giuseppina Martinuzzi (1844–1925), Italian pedagogue, journalist, socialist and feminist
- Giuseppina Masotti Biggiogero (1894–1977), Italian mathematician and historian
- Giuseppina Macrì (born 1974), Italian judoka
- Giuseppina Morlacchi (1846–1886), Italian-American ballerina
- Giuseppina Nicoli (1863–1924), Italian nun
- Giuseppina Occhionero (born 1978), Italian lawyer and politician
- Giuseppina Osenga, Italian 19th-century painter
- Giuseppina Pasqua (1855–1930), Italian opera singer
- Giuseppina Pastori (1891–1983), Italian physician and biologist
- Giuseppina Princi (born 1972), Italian politician
- Giuseppina Quaglia Borghese (1764–1831), Italian painter and pastellist
- Giuseppina Ronzi de Begnis (1800–1853), Italian soprano
- Giuseppina Strepponi (1815–1897), Italian soprano
- Giuseppina Suriano (1915–1950), Italian Roman Catholic
- Giuseppina Torello (1943–2024), Italian athlete
- Giuseppina Tufano (born 1965), Italian basketball player
- Giuseppina Tuissi (1923–1945), Italian resistance member
- Giuseppina Vadalà (1824–1914), Italian revolutionary
- Giuseppina Vitali (1845–1915), Italian soprano, composer and writer

=== Giuseppa ===
- Giuseppa Barbapiccola (1702–1740), Italian natural philosopher
- Giuseppa Bolognara Calcagno (1826–1884), Italian revolutionary
- Giuseppa Scandola (1849–1903), Italian nun
- Maria Giuseppa Robucci (1903–2019), Italian supercentenarian
- Maria Giuseppa Rossello (1811–1880), Italian nun

=== Giusi ===
- Giusi Malato (born 1971), Italian water polo player
- Giusi Merli (born 1943), Italian actress
- Giusi Nicolini (born 1961), Italian politician
- Giusi Raspani Dandolo (1916–2000), Italian actress

=== Giusy ===
- Giusy Buscemi (born 1993), Italian actress
- Giusy Ferreri (born 1979) Italian singer and songwriter
- Giusy Versace (born 1977), Italian Paralympic athlete
- Giusy Vitale (born 1972), Italian Mafia boss

== See also ==
- Giuseppina, 1960 British documentary film
- 6533 Giuseppina, main-belt asteroid
- Geppi
- Pina (name)
