= Seppi =

Seppi is an Italian family name and a Swiss German/Bavarian male given name, both related to English Joseph. The surname, originating in Trentino-South Tyrol, is derived from an apheretic pluralized form of Giuseppe; the given name is a pet form for Joseph or Josef.

== Surname ==
- Andreas Seppi (born 1984), Italian tennis player
- Donato Seppi (born 1953), Italian politician

== Given name ==
- Josef Angermüller or Seppi Angermüller (1949–1977), West German motorcycle racer
- Josef Hurschler or Seppi Hurschler (born 1983), Swiss Nordic combined skier
- Josef Ritler or Seppi Ritler (born 1939), Swiss journalist
- Josef Rottmoser or Seppi Rottmoser (born 1990), German ski mountaineer
- Jo Siffert or Seppi Siffert (1936–1971), Swiss racing driver

== See also ==
- Sepp (given name)
- Peppe/Beppe
