= Giuseppe =

- Pronunciation: Italian: [dʒuˈzɛppe]
- Gender: Male
- Language: Italian
- Name day: March 19

Origin
- Region of origin: Italy

Other names
- Nicknames: Pino, Beppe, Peppino
- Related names: Joseph, Joe (given name), Giuseppina (given name)

Giuseppe is the Italian form of the given name Joseph, from Latin Iōsēphus from Ancient Greek Ἰωσήφ (Iōsḗph), from Hebrew יוסף. The feminine form of the name is Giuseppa or Giuseppina.

People with the given name include:

Note: Some people are listed multiple times, in different sections.

== Artists and musicians ==
- Giuseppe Aldrovandini (1671–1707), Italian composer
- Giuseppe Arcimboldo (1527–1593), Italian painter
- Giuseppe Belli (singer) (1732–1760), Italian castrato singer
- Giuseppe Gioachino Belli (1791–1863), Italian poet
- Giuseppe Botero (1815–1885), Italian writer
- Giuseppe Cantersani (fl. c. 1700), Italian engraver
- Giuseppe Castiglione (1829–1908), Italian painter
- Giuseppe Castiglione (Jesuit painter) (1688–1766), Italian Jesuit missionary and court painter in China
- Giuseppe Del Puente (1841–1900), Italian baritone
- Giuseppe Giordani (1751–1798), Italian composer, mainly of opera
- Giuseppe Tomasi di Lampedusa (1896–1957), Italian writer and last Prince of Lampedusa
- Giuseppe Ottaviani (born 1978), Italian musician and disc jockey
- Giuseppe Sammartini (1695–1750), Italian composer and oboist
- Giuseppe Sanmartino or Sammartino (1720–1793), Italian sculptor
- Giuseppe Santomaso (1907–1990), Italian painter
- Giuseppe Tartini (1692–1770), Venetian composer and violinist
- Giuseppe Tornatore (born 1956), Italian film director and screenwriter
- Giuseppe Valenti (1681–1753), Italian sculptor
- Giuseppe Verdi (1813–1901), Italian opera composer

== Clergymen and saints ==
- Giuseppe Bertello (born 1942), Italian Catholic prelate and cardinal
- Giuseppe Castiglione (Jesuit painter) (1688–1766), Italian Jesuit missionary and court painter in China
- Giuseppe Maria Capece Zurlo, Theat. (1711–1801), Italian cardinal who served as Archbishop of Naples
- Giuseppe Piazzi (1746–1826), Italian Catholic priest, mathematician and astronomer
- Giuseppe Moscati (1880–1927), Italian doctor, scientific researcher, university professor and Catholic saint
- Giuseppe Siri (1906–1989), Italian Catholic cardinal and Archbishop of Genoa

== Politicians ==
- Giuseppe Bastianini (1899–1961), Italian politician and diplomat
- Giuseppe Belluzzo (1876–1952), Italian scholar and politician
- Joseph Bonaparte (1768–1844), elder brother of Napoleon, King of Naples (1806–1808) and then King of Spain (1808–1813)
- Giuseppe Castiglione (politician) (born 1963), Italian politician
- Giuseppe Caterina (1943–2025), Italian politician
- Giuseppe Conte (born 1964), Italian politician
- Giuseppe Garibaldi (1807–1882), Italian general, politician and nationalist
- Giuseppe Garibaldi II (1879–1950), better known as Peppino Garibaldi, Italian soldier and grandson of Giuseppe Garibaldi
- Giuseppe Gorla (1895–1979), Italian engineer and politician
- Giuseppe Guarino (politician) (1922–2020), Italian scholar and politician
- Giuseppe L'Abbate (born 1985), Italian politician
- Giuseppe Lupis (1896–1979), Italian journalist and politician
- Giuseppe Martellotta (1941–2025), Italian politician
- Giuseppe Mazzini (1805–1872), Italian politician, journalist and activist for the unification of Italy
- Giuseppe Medici (1907–2000), Italian politician and economist
- Giuseppe Micheli (politician) (1874–1948), Italian politician
- Giuseppe Moles (born 1967), Italian politician
- Giuseppe Tatarella (1935–1999), Italian politician
- Giuseppe Trabucchi (1904–1975), Italian lawyer and politician
- Giuseppe Zamberletti (1933–2019), Italian politician
- Giuseppe Zurlo (1757–1828), Italian jurist and politician

== Scientists, mathematicians and engineers ==
- Giuseppe Belluzzo (1876–1952), Italian mechanical engineer and politician
- Giuseppe Colombo (1920–1984), Italian scientist, mathematician and engineer
- Giuseppe Di Benedetto (born 1946), Italian cardiac surgeon
- Giuseppe Gené (1800–1847), Italian zoologist
- Giuseppe Maggi (1930–2025), Italian archaeologist
- Giuseppe Moscati (1880–1927), Italian doctor, scientific researcher, university professor and Catholic saint
- Giuseppe Peano (1858–1932), Italian mathematician
- Giuseppe Piazzi (1746–1826), Italian Catholic priest, mathematician and astronomer

== Soldiers and policemen ==
- Giuseppe Baudoin (1843–1896), Italian major
- Giuseppe Cavo Dragone (born 1957), Italian naval officer
- Giuseppe Pennella (1864–1925), Italian lieutenant general
- Joseph Petrosino (1860–1909), New York City police officer and pioneer in the fight against organized crime

== Sportsmen ==
- Giuseppe Baresi (born 1958), Italian football manager and former player
- Giuseppe Bazzeghin (1897–1945), Italian footballer
- Giuseppe Bergomi (born 1963), Italian retired footballer
- Giuseppe Coverlizza (1914–1945), Italian footballer
- Giuseppe Farina (1906–1966), Italian racing driver and first official Formula One World Champion (1950)
- Giuseppe Favalli (born 1972), Italian former footballer
- Giuseppe Meazza (1910–1979), Italian football manager and player
- Giuseppe Micheli (pentathlete), Italian modern pentathlete
- Giuseppe Ottaviani (athlete) (1916–2020), Italian athlete
- Giuseppe Papadopulo (born 1948), Italian football manager and player
- Giuseppe Romele (born 1992), Italian para cross-country skier
- Giuseppe Savoldi (1947–2026), Italian football player and coach
- Giuseppe Seimandi (born 1987), Italian archer
- Giuseppe Signori (born 1968), Italian retired footballer

== Others ==
- Giuseppe Balsamo (1743–1795), real name of occultist Alessandro Cagliostro
- Giuseppe Frazzetto (born 1955), art critic, philosopher and professor of the history of art
- Giuseppe Guarneri (1698–1744), Italian luthier
- Giuseppe Psaila (1891–1960), Maltese architect

== See also ==
- Giuseppe, a character in the animated series Adventure Time
- Beppe, Bepi and Beppo, diminutive forms of Giuseppe
- Di Giuseppe, an Italian surname meaning "son of Giuseppe"
