= Pastori =

Pastori is an Italian surname. Notable people with the surname include:

- Antonietta Pastori (born 1929), Italian operatic soprano
- Giuseppina Pastori (1891–1983), Italian physician and biologist
- Maria Pastori (1895-1975), Italian mathematician

== See also ==
- Niña Pastori, stage name of María Rosa García García (1978), Spanish flamenco singer
