= Alejandro Faurlín =

Argentine footballer (born 1986)

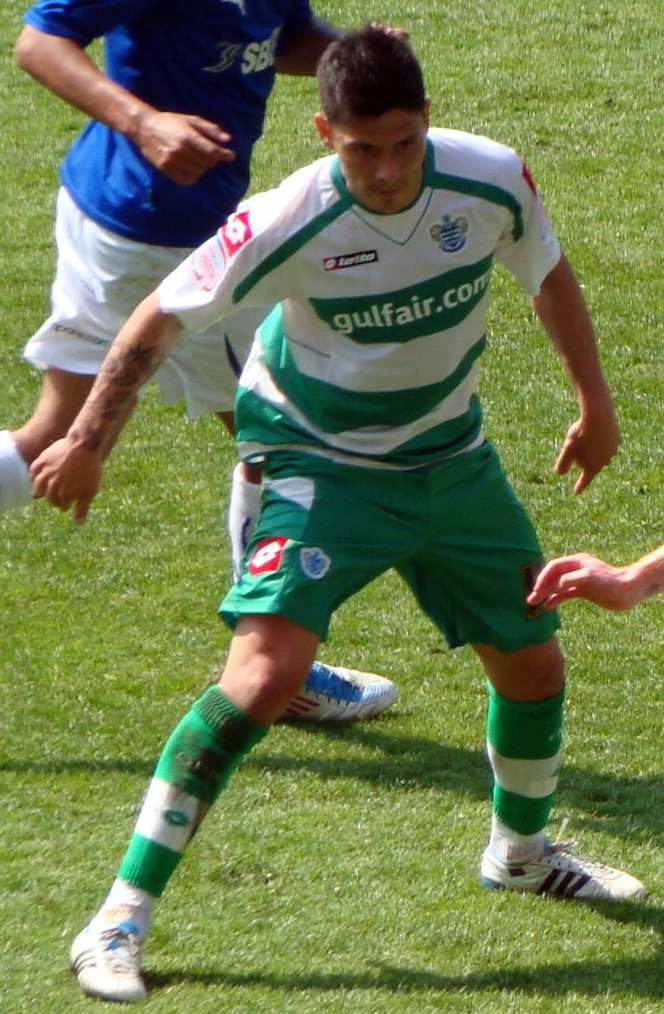
- Faurlín playing for Queens Park Rangers in 2011

Personal information
- Full name: Alejandro Damián Faurlín
- Date of birth: 9 August 1986 (age 40)
- Place of birth: Rosario, Argentina
- Height: 1.85 m (6 ft 1 in)
- Position: Midfielder

Youth career
- Rosario Central
- 2005–2007: River Plate

Senior career*
Years	Team	Apps	(Gls)
2004–2005	Rosario Central	1	(0)
2005–2007	River Plate	0	(0)
2007	Atlético de Rafaela	18	(2)
2007–2008	Marítimo B	15	(1)
2008–2009	Instituto	51	(10)
2009–2016	Queens Park Rangers	151	(5)
2013	→ Palermo (loan)	6	(0)
2016–2017	Getafe	30	(5)
2017–2018	Cruz Azul	2	(0)
2018–2019	Mallorca	13	(0)
2019	→ Marbella (loan)	16	(0)
2019–2020	Marbella	12	(0)
2021–2022	Instituto	22	(0)
Total		338	(23)

International career
2003	Argentina U-17	10	(2)
- * Club domestic league appearances and goals as of 19 May 2019

Alejandro Damián Faurlín (Latin American Spanish pronunciation: [aleˈxandɾo fauɾˈlin]; born 9 August 1986) is an Argentine former professional footballer who played as a midfielder. He has played professionally in his homeland as well as for clubs in Portugal, England, Italy, Spain and Mexico.

== Career ==
Faurlín began his playing career in 2004 with Rosario Central in the Primera División Argentina, making his debut in a 1–0 away defeat to Quilmes on 9 May 2004. After making only one appearance for his home town club, he joined Atlético de Rafaela of the Argentine 2nd division in 2007, followed by Portuguese side Marítimo B in 2008. Between 2008 and 2009, he played for Instituto de Córdoba of the Argentine 2nd division.

=== Queens Park Rangers ===
On 7 July 2009, Faurlín signed for Queens Park Rangers for an alleged club record fee that could rise to £3.5 million, though there was no evidence that QPR had paid that amount to Instituto. The Football Association (FA) found the player joined the club on Bosman transfer, but under contract with American incorporated company TYP Sports Agency LLC. TYP acquired the rights from Instituto for just US$250,000. In 2010, TYP requested QPR to pay US$1 million (£615,000) and filed a complaint to the FA. In October, Faurlín extended his contract whereupon £200,000 was paid to TYP's owner Peppino Tirri as an agent fee. In January 2011, QPR paid £615,000 to TYP. Due to the involvement of third-party ownership, QPR was fined in 2011, as it violated regulations put in place by the FA after a similar, earlier case involving Carlos Tevez. The violation could have resulted in a penalty of deducted points for QPR, but on 7 May, the FA announced that QPR would not be deducted any points and consequently would be promoted to the Premier League after placing first in the 2010–11 Football League Championship.

£500,000 was reported paid to Inter Milan in compensation, as they had a first-option clause in his contract. Faurlín reportedly turned down the chance to play for Inter as José Mourinho could not guarantee him first-team football. In 2011, it emerged that the fee was paid to a third party. Prior to signing for QPR, Faurlín rejected opportunities to play in Spain, Italy and Greece. He told QPR's official site:

"I am really pleased to be here in England, playing for a club like Queens Park Rangers. I know a lot about the English game and I really admire the ability of the teams at this level. I am really looking forward to playing for the club and showing the manager, my fellow players and the QPR supporters what I can do. I had opportunities to play in Spain, Italy and Greece, but QPR was my choice and I'm delighted to be here. I was really impressed with the set-up and the ambition of the club and can't wait to make my QPR debut."

Faurlín made his QPR debut against Bristol City on 18 August 2009 and scored his first goal, against Sheffield Wednesday, on 3 April 2010. He made an instant impact in the QPR side and was voted both supporters and players Player of the Year at the end of the 2009–10 season. Faurlín was part of the Rangers team that won promotion to the Premier League. He began top-flight life well, forming a partnership with new signing Joey Barton. He captained the QPR team that drew 1–1 with Milton Keynes Dons in the FA Cup, but was injured during the match, rupturing his anterior cruciate ligament (ACL) in his right leg. The injury ruled him out for the season and led to his omission from QPR's 25-man squad for the second half of the season.

After undergoing rehabilitation in his native Argentina as well as Barcelona, Faurlín made his return from injury in the League Cup match against Walsall, playing a full 90 minutes. He went on to start against Manchester City later that week. Faurlín earned his first assist of the 2012–13 campaign by assisting Bobby Zamora's opening goal against Tottenham Hotspur away at White Hart Lane.

==== Palermo (loan) ====
On 31 January 2013, Serie A club Palermo announced the signing of Faurlín in a loan deal, with an option to make the move permanent by the end of the 2012–13 season. Faurlín soon went straight to the first-team squad, making his debut in a 2–1 loss against Atalanta on 3 February 2013.

==== Back to Queens Park Rangers ====
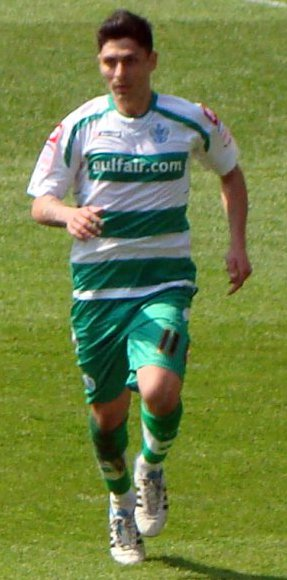
Faurlín playing for Queens Park Rangers in 2011

After an unsuccessful spell at Palermo, Faurlín returned to QPR at the end of the 2012–13 season. While Faurlín was away on loan, QPR were relegated from the Premier League to the Football League Championship, where Faurlín had first shone for QPR. He was one of a few players to stay on as QPR revamped their playing squad. He started the season as first choice central midfielder, being named in the starting line-up in the first game of the season against Sheffield Wednesday, helping QPR to a 2–1 victory at Loftus Road. Faurlín continued to be involved in QPR's matches, the fans' favourite regaining his regular place in the starting line-up. During a home match against Derby County, a challenge from John Eustace resulted in Faurlín coming off on a stretcher. Two days later, scans confirmed that Faurlín had injured his ACL in his left leg, an injury he had suffered in the opposite leg 23 months ago; the new injury ruled him out for the rest of the season. While Faurlín was finishing his rehabilitation, QPR won promotion back to the Premier League on 24 May 2014 via the play-offs with a 1–0 win over Derby at Wembley Stadium. Faurlín was present in amongst the stands with QPR fans and was celebrating on the pitch with his teammates after Bobby Zamora scored the winning goal in the 89th minute of the match.

On 2 July 2014, Faurlín, now the club's longest-serving player, signed a new one-year deal with QPR. Faurlín, for successive seasons, started in the first league game of the season at home, this time against Hull City. Faurlín started in an FA Cup game away to Burton Albion and landed innocuously on his left knee, being replaced by Leroy Fer on the hour mark. Although Faurlín walked off the pitch with no distressing pain, scans discovered it was a re-occurrence of the previous injury he had only recovered from two months previously, putting him out of action for another nine months. QPR's head of medical services, Peter Florida James, said, "The knee itself stayed pretty stable, but the scans have since revealed his ACL graft has ruptured." The injury meant that Faurlín has now injured his ACL three times in the last three years. In August 2015, he made his return to the QPR first team.

=== Getafe ===
On 8 August 2016, Faurlín joined Segunda División side Getafe CF, as a free agent.

=== Marbella ===
On 22 January 2019, Faurlín joined Marbella FC on a loan deal until the end of the 2018–19 season. On 22 July, he signed a permanent contract with the club.

=== Instituto ===
In February 2021, Faurlín returned to Argentina and former club Instituto.

On 19 February 2022, Faurliń announced his retirement from professional football.

== International career ==
Faurlín was selected by Argentina for the 2003 FIFA U-17 World Cup.

== Career statistics ==
Club	Season	League			Cup		League Cup		Total	
Club	Season	Division	Apps	Goals	Apps	Goals	Apps	Goals	Apps	Goals
Rosario Central	2003–04	Primera División	1	0	–		–		1	0
Rosario Central	2004–05	Primera División	0	0	–		–		0	0
Rosario Central	Total		1	0	0	0	0	0	1	0
Atlético Rafaela	2006–07	Primera B Nacional	18	2	–		–		18	2
Marítimo B	2007–08	Segunda Divisão	15	1	–		–		15	1
Instituto	2007–08	Primera B Nacional	17	4	–		–		17	4
Instituto	2008–09	Primera B Nacional	34	6	–		–		34	6
Instituto	Total		51	10	0	0	0	0	51	10
Queens Park Rangers	2009–10	Championship	41	1	2	0	1	0	44	1
Queens Park Rangers	2010–11	Championship	40	3	1	0	0	0	41	3
Queens Park Rangers	2011–12	Premier League	20	1	1	0	0	0	21	1
Queens Park Rangers	2012–13	Premier League	11	0	2	0	2	0	13	0
Queens Park Rangers	2013–14	Championship	7	0	0	0	2	0	9	0
Queens Park Rangers	2014–15	Premier League	2	0	0	0	1	0	3	0
Queens Park Rangers	2015–16	Championship	30	0	0	0	0	0	30	0
Queens Park Rangers	Total		151	5	6	0	6	0	163	5
Palermo	2012–13	Serie A	6	0	0	0	0	0	6	0
Getafe CF	2016–17	Segunda División	30	5	1	0	0	0	31	5
Cruz Azul	2017–18	Liga MX	2	0	3	0	0	0	5	0
RCD Mallorca	2017–18	Segunda División B	8	0	0	0	1	0	9	0
RCD Mallorca	2018–19	Segunda División	5	0	0	0	2	0	7	0
RCD Mallorca	Total		13	0	0	0	3	0	16	0
Marbella FC (loan)	2018–19	Segunda División B Group 4	16	0	0	0	0	0	16	0
Marbella FC	2019–20	Segunda División B Group 4	12	0	0	0	1	0	13	0
Instituto	2021	Primera B Nacional	22	0	0	0	0	0	22	0
Career total			338	23	10	0	10	0	358	23

== Honours ==
Queens Park Rangers

- Football League Championship: 2010–11

Individual

- Queens Park Rangers Supporters' Player of the Year: 2009–10
