= Sandro Bracchitta =

Italian printmaker

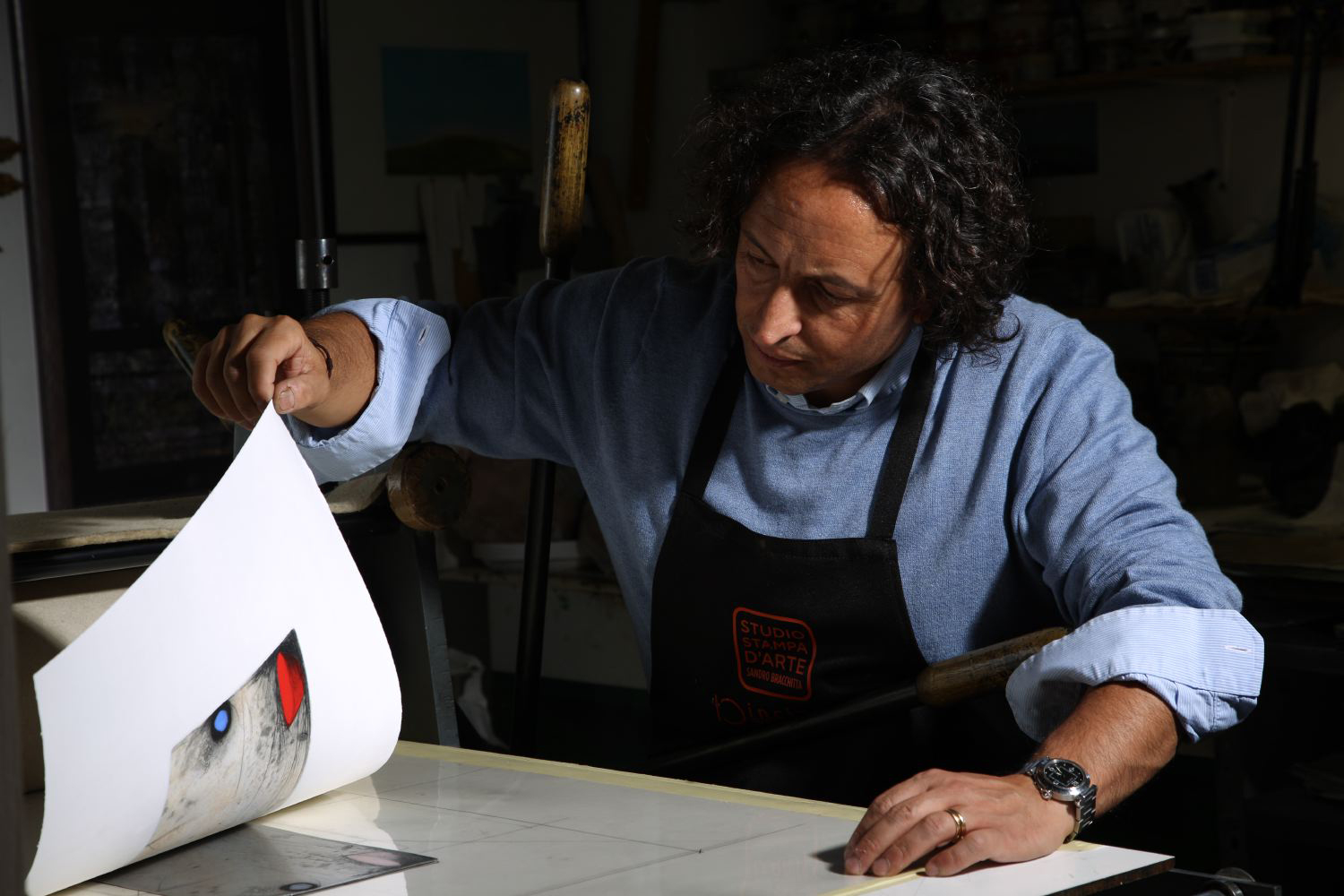
- Sandro Bracchitta
- Born: 24 September 1966; Ragusa, Italy
- Known for: Engraving

Sandro Bracchitta (born 24 September 1966 in Ragusa) is an Italian printmaker.

== Biography ==
Leading exponent of Italian engraving of the XXI° century, he studied in Florence where he attended the Course of Painting at the Academy of Fine Arts in Florence getting his degree in 1990; in the same year he began working as a painter and engraver. His first solo exhibition took place in 1991 at Palazzo Datini in Prato, Italy.

In 2020 he was awarded a scholarship to specialise at "Il Bisonte", the School of Graphic Arts in Florence, and in 1993 he worked as an assistant of Maestro Viggiano, in the same school. In the same year he began to exhibit his works in several art exhibitions.

In 1994 he was invited to take part in the 'World Triennial Engraving Exhibition' in Chamalières (France), and in the same year he won the '14th edition of Mini Print International', in Cadaqués (Spain).

From 1994 to 1997 he was invited to several outstanding national and international exhibitions such as the '21st and 22nd International Biennial Graphics Exhibition' in Lubiana (Slovenia), The International Award in Graphics Arts in Biella (Italy), the Ibiza Biennial in Spain, the Cracow Triennial Engraving Exhibition in Poland, the Stedeliske Museum of Sint Niklaas, Belgium, as well as the International Graphics Exhibition in Bitola (Macedonia), Kharkiu (Russia), Uzice (Croatia), Györ and Budapest (Hungary).

In 2001 he received an award from the National Museum of Modern Art, Tokyo at the International Exhibition of Prints in Kanagay, and an award from the City Museum of Györ in Hungary. He received the Leonardo Sciascia "Amateur d'Estampes" award in 2007, and the Grand Prize at the Ural Print Triennial in Russia. In 2009 he received the Grand Prize at the 2nd Bangkok Triennial International Print and Drawing Exhibition in Thailand. He was invited to exhibit at the Sicilian Pavilion at the 54th Venice Biennale in 2011.

In 2007 he received the first prize at the International Biennial of Engraving of Acqui Terme. in 2011 he was invited to the World Plate and Print Art Exhibition Millennial Wind, in the temple of Buddhist Tripitaka, in South Korea.

He was also invited – as the only Italian representative – to take part in the '4th Sapporo International Biennial' in Japan, in the 'Triennial Graphics Exhibition' in Tallinn (Estonia) and in the 'Beijing Ex Libris International Show' in the People's Republic of China, and to the 54th Venice Biennale.

In 2017 the Cabinet of Drawings and Prints of the Uffizi in Florence acquires one of his works of engraving.

On several occasions he exhibited with the "Gruppo di Scicli", a group of important and renowned Sicilian artists.

Currently, he is professor of engraving at the Academy of Fine Arts in Catania. He lives and works in Ragusa.

== Solo exhibitions ==
1997

- Dvorni TRG Gallery, Ljubljana, Slovenia.

1999

- Pyhäniemi '99, Hollola, Finland.
- Galleria della Pergola, Pesaro, Italy.

2000

- Galleria Bottega d’Arte, Acqui Terme (Al), Italy.
- Covalenco Gallery, Geldrop, Holland.

2001

- Galleria Tornabuoni, Florence, Italy.

2003

- Zebra Two Gallery, London, Great Britain.
- Beukers Gallery, Rotterdam, Holland.
- Galleria Lo Magno, Modica (Rg), Italy.

2004

- Galerie de Wégimont, Liege, Belgium.
- La Luce Del Vulcano, Galleria Visconti Fine Art, Ljubljana, Slovenia.

2005

- Ciclicamente Accade, GrafiqueArtGallery, Bologna, Italy.
- Galleria Repetto e Massucco, Acqui Terme (Al), Italy.

2006

- La Luce Del Vulcano, Galleria Chantal Bamberger, Strasbourg, France.
- Gallery Heike Arndt, København, Denmark.
- Galleria Zangbieri, Basil, Switzerland.

2012

- Craved Miracles, Ex Chiesa di San Michele, Modica (Rg), Italy.

2013

- Craved Miracles, Regional Museum, Valdstein Castle, Jičìn, Czech Republic.
  1. Carte, Galleria Koinè, Scicli, Ragusa, Italy.

2016

- Teatro de Vila Real, Douro, Portugal.

2017

- Oltre la soglia del tempo presente, Museo della Media Valle del Liri (sezione archeologica), Sora, Italy.
- Incisioni/Prints, Ex Convento del Carmine, Modica, Italy.

2018

- Casa e Trasloco, Pygmalion Gallery, Timișoara, Romania.
- Nel respiro del tempo Incisioni /Prints 1997–2017, Umberto Mastroianni, Fundation, Castello di Ladislao, Arpino Italy
- L'archetipo... il segno, Quadrifoglio Gallery, Ortigia, Siracusa, Italy

== Group exhibitions ==
1993

- Galleria Il Bisonte, Florence, Italy.

1995

- 21st International Biennial Graphics Exhibition, Ljubljana, Slovenia.
- Prize for Young Italian Engravers, Museo d’Arte Con¬tem¬poranea Villa Croce, Genoa, Italy.

1996

- International Prize for Graphic Art, Biella, Italy.
- 14th Ibiza Biennial, Ibiza, Spain.

1997

- Cracow Triennial Engraving Exhibition, Krakow, Poland.
- Stedeliske Museum, Sint Niklaas, Belgium.
- III Biennial Engraving Exhibition Dry Point, Uzice, Croatia.

1998

- 4th Sapporo International Print Biennial Exhibition, Hokkaido Museum of Modern Art, Sapporo, Japan.
- First World Small Printings & Ex-libris Works Exhibition, Beijing, People's Republic of China.

2000

- Quarant’anni de Il Bisonte, Museo Marino Marini, Concorso Internazionale per la Grafica d’Arte (3rd prize), Florence, Italy.
- Krakow Triennial Engraving Exhibition "Bridge to the future", Kraków, Poland.
- International Print Triennial, Nuremberg, Germany.
- 5th European Engraving Biennial of Small Graphics Forms, Vigado Gallery, Budapest, Hungary.

2001

- International Print Triennial 2001, Kawa Prefectural Gallery, Kanagawa (National Museum Prize of the National Museum of Modern Art of Tokyo), Japan.

2002

- Intergraphia, World Award Winners Gallery, Torun City Museum, Poland.
- Graphica Creativa 2002, Jyvaskyla, Finland.
- The 12th Space International Print Biennial, Sunkok Kunstmuseum, Seoul, Korea.
- 6th International Biennial of Small Graphic Forms, Budapest.

2003

- 4° Biennale Internationale de Gravure, Musee d’Art Moderne et d’Art Contemporain, Liege, Belgium.
- Seven Print Artists from around the World, Hyundai Arts Center Gallery, Ulsan, Korea.
- Il Bisonte agli Uffizi, Galleria degli Uffizi, Florence, Italy.
- 8th Engraving Triennial, Museo della Permanente, Milan, Italy.

2004

- Sandro Bracchitta – Piero Ruggeri, Beukers Gallery, Rotterdam, Holland.

2005

- Biennale Internationale de Gravure, Liege, Belgium.

2006

- National Taiwan Museum of Fine Arts, Taiwan, People's Republic of China.

2007

- Internationale Grafiktriennale Krakau, Oldenburg Wien 2007 at Künstlerhaus, Vienna, Austria.

2008

- 13th International Biennial Print Exhibition, R.O.C. National Taiwan.

2009

- The 2nd Bangkok Triennial International Print and Drawing Exhibition "Grand Prize for Engraving", Bangkok, Thailand.
- Biennale Internazionale D’Estampe Contemporaine de Trois-Rivières, Quèbec, Canada.

2010

- In Galleria..., Galleria Stefano Forni, Bologna, Italy.
- Galleria Zangbieri, Basel, Switzerland.

2011

- Maestri dell’incisione contemporanea italiana, Museo Slesiano di Katowice, Poland.
- Space International Print Biennial, Seoul, Korea.
- World Plate and Print Art Exhibition – Millennial Wind' Korea.
- 54th Venice International Biennial of Art, Pavilion Italy / Sicily, curated by V. Sgarbi, Galleria Civica Montevergini, Syracuse (Sicily).
- Acqui Incisione Prize-Travelling Exhibition, Fundación C.I.E.C., Centro Internacional de la Estampa Contemporánea, Betanzos, Coruña, Spain.

2012

- Acqui Incisione Prize-Travelling Exhibition, Palazzo Robellini, Acqui Terme and AL-Cultuur Centrum, Ypres, Belgium.

2013

- Tribuna Graphic 2013, Art Museum Cluj-Napoca, Romania.

2014

- Segni Moderni, O RI E Art Gallery, Tokyo, Japan.
- 7th international printmaking Biennial of Douro 2014, Museu do Côa, Vila Nova de Foz Côa – Portugal.
- Rene Carcan International Prize For Printmaking, BELvue Museum, Brussels, Belgium.

2015

- Print Works of Contemporary Artists in Italy, Art Zone Kaguraoka Gallery, Kyoto, Japan.
- 5TH Guanlan International Print Biennial, Guanlan, China.
- 2nd Global Print 2015, Douro, Côa Museum, Vila Nova de Fozcôa, Portugal.
- 5th Indonesia Triennial of Graphic Art, BentaraBudaya, Jakarta, Indonesia.
- Diplomatic Art, Helios Gallery, Timişoara, Romania.
- Print Works of Contemporary Artists in Italy, Art Zone Kaguraoka Gallery, Kyoto, Japan.
- 5TH Guanlan International Print Biennial, Printmaking Museum, Guanlan, China.
- 2nd Global Print 2015, Douro, Côa Museum, Vila Nova de Fozcôa, Portugal.
- 5th Indonesia Triennial of Graphic Art, BentaraBudaya, Jakarta, Indonesia.
- Diplomatic Art, Helios Gallery, Timişoara, Romania.
- International Print Triennial, Bunkier Sztuki Gallery of Contemporary Art, Krakow, Poland.

2016

- Incisori italiani, Palazzo Lomellini, Carmagnola, Italy.
- 1st Łódź International Print Biennial, Fabryka Sztuki, Łódź, Poland.

2017

- 6TH Guanlan International Print Biennial, China Printmaking Museum, Guanlan, China.
- Imago Mundi, Spazio ZAC – Cantieri Culturali alla Zisa, Palermo, Italy.
- Libri d'Artista, Academy of Fine Arts collection, Oratorio dei SS. Elena e Costantino, Palermo, Italy.

2018

- Italian-Irish Connection, Garter Lane Art Center, Waterford, Ireland.
- Italia – Cina, Esposizione Internazionale di Incisione, Museo d’Arte Contemporanea del Yinchuan, China.
- Italian-Irish Connection, Crawford Art Gallery, Cork, Ireland.
- Alter Ego, grafica Romena e Italiana, Museo d'Arte di Cluj-Napoca, Romania.

2019

- Empatie e Contaminazioni, Musei Civici, Pavia, Italy.
- 7TH Guanlan International Print Biennial, China Printmaking Museum, Guanlan, China.
- Deja vu-Odessa, Invitational Visual Art Project, Literary Museum, Odessa, Ucraina.
- Resonance between civilization, China Printmaking Museum, Guanlan, China. *Parallelsi, San Stefano Gallery, Sofia, Bulgaria.
- On Paper IV, MACC, Museo d’Arte Contemporanea, Calasetta, Italy.

== Prizes ==
1994

- 14th Mini Print International, Taller Galleria Fort, Cadaquès, Spain.

1997

- 2nd National Prize of Engraving "Fabio Bertoni" ( first prize), Fermignano (Ps), Italy.

1998

- Grand Prix, International Mini Print Finland, Lahti Art Museum, Finland.

2001

- International Triennial of Engraving, Kanagawa, Japan.

2001

- Prix of the Municipal Museum of Györ, Hungary.

2007

- Grand Prix, Biennial international of Print, Acqui Terme. Italy.
- Grand Prix, Ural Print Triennial, Russia.
- Grand Prix Leonardo Sciascia "Ama¬teur d’Estampes", Castello Sforzesco, Milan, Italy.

2009

- Grand Prix, 2nd International Triennial Print and Drawing Exhibition, Bangkok, Thailand.
- Internazionale D’Estampe Contemporaine de Trois- Rivières, Quèbec, Canada. ( Purchase Prize)

2011

- 16th Space International Print Biennial Biennial, Seoul, Korea (Purchase Prize).

2015

- "Giuseppe Maestri" Prize, Museo Civico delle Cappuccine, Bagnacavallo (Ra), Italy.

2019

- 7TH Guanlan International Print Biennial of Printing,(honorary work), Guanlan, China.

== Bibliography ==
- B. Kovic, Sandro Bracchitta. Metafora e geografia del silenzio,(exhibition catalogue, Dvori trg Galerja, Ljubljana, November 1997), Barone&Bella, Ragusa 1997 (pp. 8–9).
- O. Fazzina, Dentro la materia, in Sandro Bracchitta. Opere. (exhibition catalogue, Galleria degli Archi, Comiso, 14 February – 1 March 1998), Edizioni Salarchi immagini, Comiso, 1998 (pp. 7–8)
- N. Micieli, Un atlante dei luoghi della rigenerazione, in N. Micieli, Sandro Bracchitta. Incisioni, 1996–2000 (exhibition catalogue, Galleria degli Archi, Comiso, 24 September – 19 October 2000; Galleria Bottega d'Arte, Acqui Terme, 7–28 October 2000; Visconti Fine Art, Kolizej, Ljubljana, 15 January – 15 February 2001), Edizioni Salarchi immagini, Comiso, 2000.
- M. Goldin (edited by), Per amore. Quindici anni di scelte a Palazzo Sarcinelli (exhibition catalogue, Palazzo Sarcinelli, Galleria Comunale, Conegliano, 19 October – 8 December 2002), Linea d'ombra Libri, Cornuda, 2002.
- M. Di Capua, Lo sguardo italiano, in G. Distefano (curated by), Lo sguardo italiano. Ventidue artisti per Bufalino (exhibition catalogue, Foyer del Teatro Naselli, Comiso, 8 December 2004 – 9 January 2005), Fondazione Gesualdo Bufalino, Comiso 2004 (pp. 13–16).
- J.P. Rouge, Sandro Bracchitta, in J.P. Rouge (curated by), Wegimont Culture. Bracchitta, De Bolle, Deconick, Viollet-Le-Duck (exhibition catalogue, Galerie de Wegimont, Liege, September, 2004), n.197, Philippe Delate, Liege, 2004 (pp. 2–3).
- Sciaccaluga, Prima del Big Bang?, in Sandro Bracchitta. Opere recenti (exhibition catalogue, Galleria Repetto e Massucco, Acqui Terme, 29 October – 10 December 2005), Li.Ze.A., Acqui Terme, 2005.
- G. Giuffrè, Quale paesaggio, in Quale paesaggio (exhibition catalogue, Galleria Lo Magno, Modica, 2–20 December 2006), Edizioni Salarchi immagini, Comiso, 2006.
- G. Frazzetto, Sacralità del visibile: il Gruppo di Scicli, in A. Sarnari (curated by), Il Gruppo di Scicli (exhibition catalogue, Fabbriche Chiaramontane, Agrigento, 19 July – 7 September 2008), Edizioni Salarchi immagini – Amici della pittura siciliana dell'Ottocento, Comiso, Agrigento, 2008 (pp. 15–17).
- A. Gerbino, Nel corpo, nel paesaggio, in A. Gerbino (curated by), Nel corpo, nel paesaggio. Quindici artisti per l'Accademia delle Scienze Mediche. Oli, tecniche miste e pastelli, (catalogue of the permanent exhibition, Accademia delle Scienze Mediche, Palermo), Plumelia quaderni di cultura, Bagheria, 2008 (pp. 17–21).
- A. Guastella, Materia e antimateria, in A. Gerbino (curated by), Nel corpo, nel paesaggio. Quindici artisti per l'Accademia delle Scienze Mediche. Oli, tecniche miste e pastelli, (catalogue of the permanent exhibition, Accademia delle Scienze Mediche, Palermo), Plumelia quaderni di cultura, Bagheria, 2008 (pp. 57–58).
- G. Schialvino, L'incisione, in Sandro Bracchitta. Incisioni. (exhibition catalogue, Palazzo Mormino, Donnalucata, 8–30 August 2009) Arti Grafiche Mora, Ragusa, 2009 (pp. 9–10)
- E. Valenza, Sandro Bracchitta, in "Continente Sicilia", January–April 2012 (catalogue of the exhibition Eruzioni, la sedia rossa, curated by G. Maltese, Galleria Mediterranea, Palermo, 10 February – 11 March 2012), Editrice Jetset, Palermo 2012 (pp. 1848–1851).
- A. D'Amico (curated by), Craved Miracles, (exhibition catalogue, Ex Chiesa di San Michele, Modica, 7 July – 30 August 2012), Silvana Editoriale, 2012, Cinisello Balsamo, Milano.
- Paolo Nifoì, Loredana Rea, Daniela Vasta, (exhibition catalogue) "Incisioni/Prints", Ex Convento del Carmine, Modica, Italy. Edizioni Salarchi Immagini, 2017, Ragusa Italy.
- D. Vasta, Storie di Incisori opere e protagonisti della grafica moderna e contemporanea, Gangemi Editore, 2019, Roma Italy.
