= Osenga =

Osenga is a surname. Notable people with the surname include:

- Andrew Osenga (born 1979), American singer/songwriter and progressive rock musician
- Giuseppina Osenga (fl. nineteenth-century), Italian painter, mainly of vedute and landscapes
