= Peppe Vessicchio =

Italian composer, arranger and musician (1956–2025)

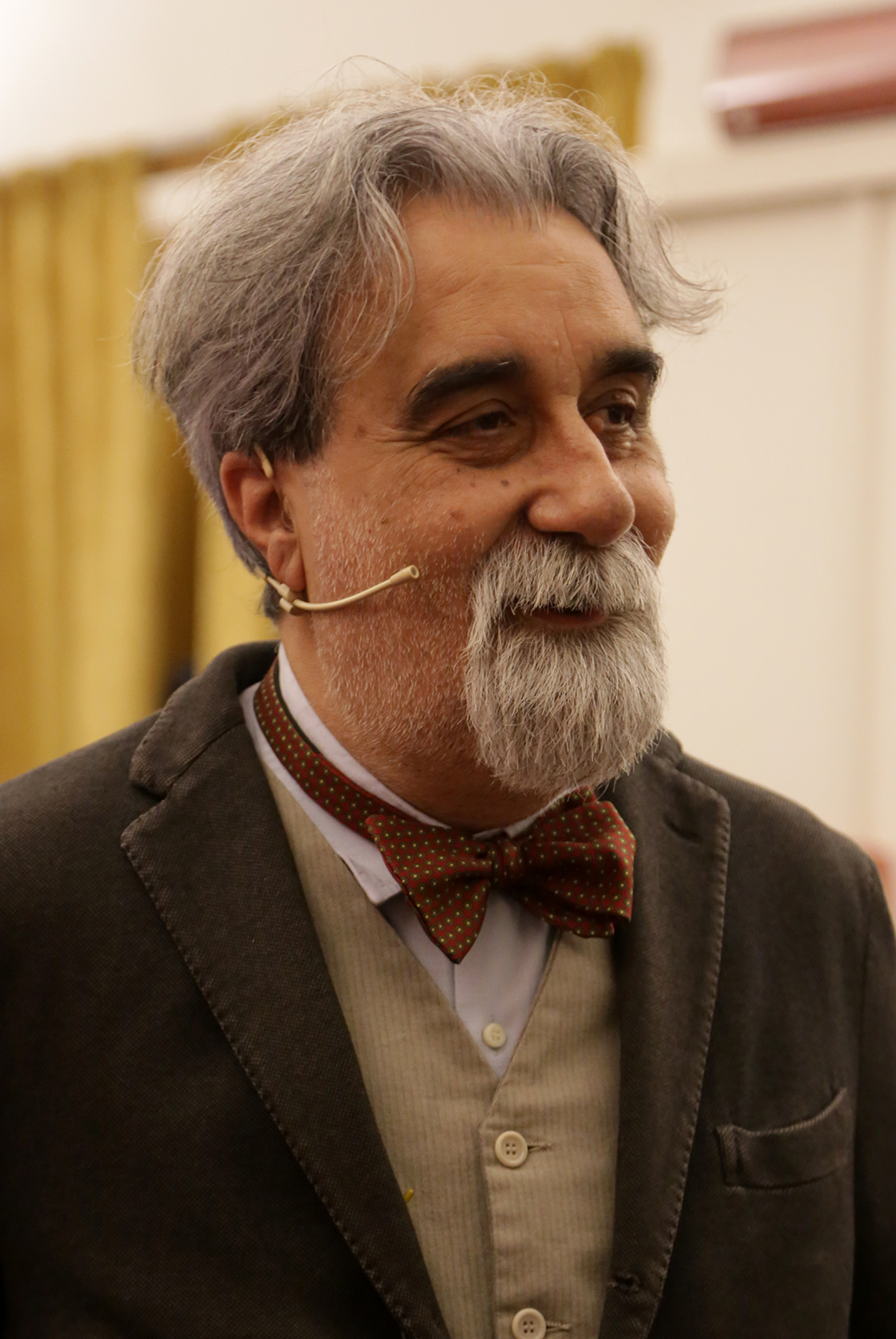
- Vessicchio in 2017
- Born: Giuseppe Vessicchio; 17 March 1956; Naples, Italy
- Died: 8 November 2025 (aged 69); Rome, Italy
- Other names: Beppe Vessicchio
- Occupations: Conductor; composer; arranger; musician; television personality

Giuseppe "Peppe" (Note: Also Beppe, although not used by Vessicchio; both forms are common hypocorisms of the name Giuseppe, with Beppe being more usual in northern Italy and Peppe in Vessicchio's native southern Italy.) Vessicchio (Italian: [dʒuˈzɛppe ˈpɛppe vesˈsikkjo]; 17 March 1956 – 8 November 2025) was an Italian conductor, composer, arranger, musician and television personality.

== Life and career ==
Born in Naples in 1956, the son of an Eternit employee, Vessicchio attended the Naples Conservatory without graduating. While still a university student of architecture, Vessicchio performed for a few years with the comedy ensamble Trettré and started collaborating with some high-profile Neapolitan singers such as Peppino di Capri, Peppino Gagliardi, Fred Bongusto, Edoardo Bennato, Nino Buonocore. He had his professional breakout in the first half of the 1980s thanks to a long collaboration with Gino Paoli as an arranger, conductor (both in studio and in tours) and composer, penning among others Paoli's hits "Ti lascio una canzone", "Una lunga storia d'amore" and "Cosa farò da grande".

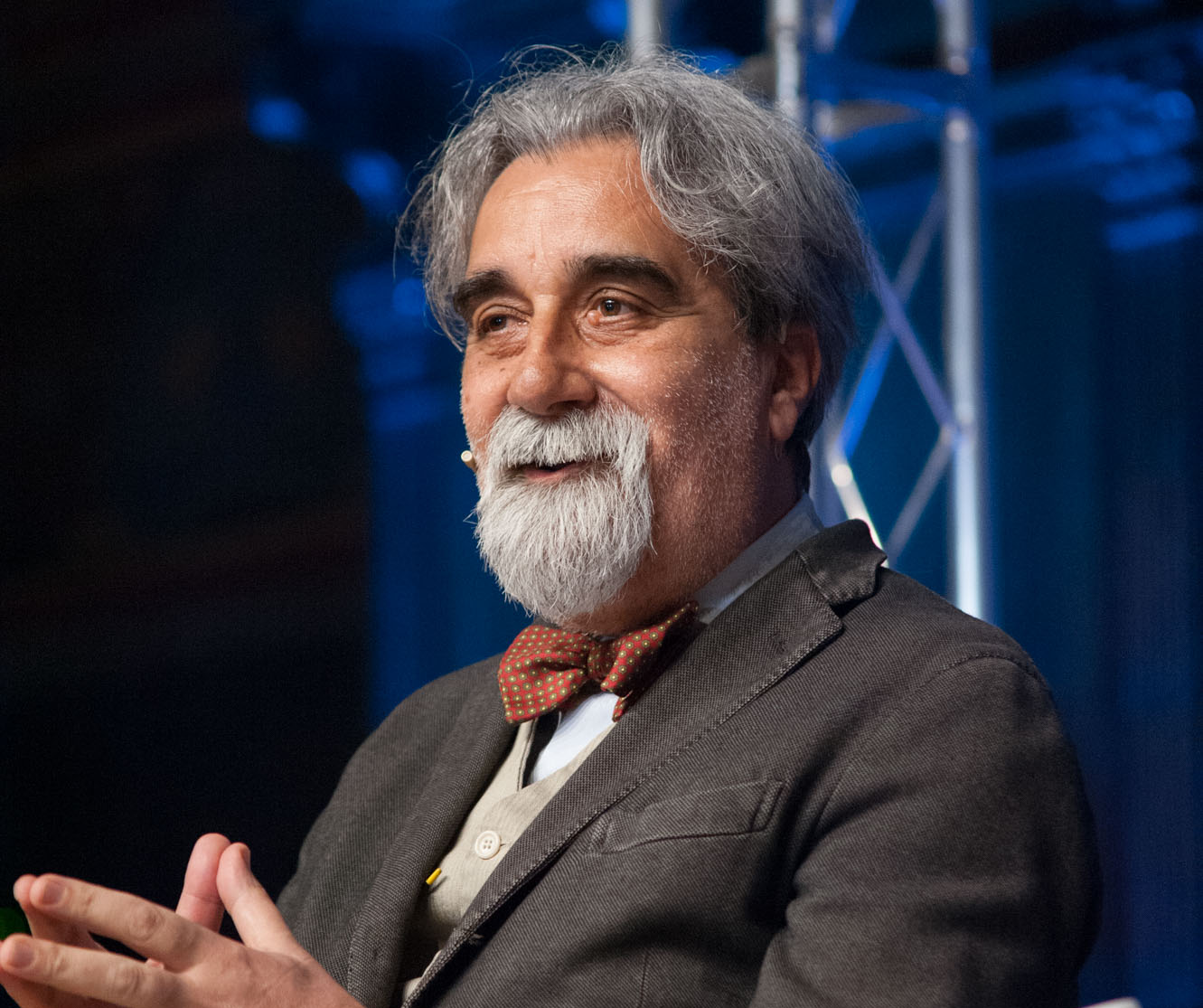
Vessicchio presenting a book at the International Journalism Festival in 2017

Vessicchio was a popular figure of the Sanremo Music Festival, and took part in nearly every edition of the Festival since 1990, when he served as the conductor for Mia Martini and Mango. He won the critics' award for best arrangement three times in 1994, 1997, and 1998. His arrangements were also awarded a prize in the year 2000 by a special jury led by Luciano Pavarotti. His collaborations include Andrea Bocelli (for whom he composed "Sogno"), Zucchero Fornaciari, Ornella Vanoni, Roberto Vecchioni, Antônio Carlos Jobim, Spagna, Max Gazzè, Ron, Mario Biondi, Le Vibrazioni, Fiordaliso, Elio e le Storie Tese, Biagio Antonacci, Rockin'1000, Syria, Piccola Orchestra Avion Travel. He was also a composer of classical music, and his chamber composition Tarantina was performed at La Scala in Milan.

Vessicchio died from complications of interstitial pneumonia at San Camillo Hospital in Rome on 8 November 2025, at the age of 69. Numerous Italian public figures expressed their condolences and several attended his funeral, which was held at the church of Santi Angeli Custodi a Città Giardino, located in the neighborhood of Rome where he resided. He was memorialized during Sanremo 2026.
