= Beppo =

Beppo is a diminutive of the given name Giuseppe. It may refer to:

== People ==
=== Given name ===
- Beppo Brem (1906–1990), German actor
- Beppo Levi (1875–1961), Italian mathematician

=== Nickname ===
- Beppo Mauhart (1933–2017), Austrian business executive
- Giuseppe Occhialini (1907–1993), Italian physicist
- Beppo Römer (1892–1944), German politician
- Joseph Schmid (1901–1956), German World War II general

== Other uses ==
- Beppo (comics), a fictional monkey in the DC Comics universe
- Beppo (poem), an 1818 poem by Lord Byron
- Beppo Station, a Japanese railway station
- Beppo Shrine, a noteworthy high ranking Shinto Shrine

== See also ==
- Bepo (disambiguation)
- Beppe, another diminutive of Giuseppe
- Buca di Beppo
