= Bill Cornish =

Australian-born English legal scholar (1937–2022)

Bill Cornish, 1986.jpg

William Rodolph Cornish CMG QC (Hon) FBA (9 August 1937 – 8 January 2022) was an Australian legal scholar and academic who was based in the United Kingdom. He was Herchel Smith Professor of Intellectual Property Law at the University of Cambridge from 1995 to 2004.

== Early life and education ==
Born in Adelaide, South Australia on 9 August 1937, Cornish graduated with a law degree at the University of Adelaide in 1960 and then came to England to carry out postgraduate study; he completed a Bachelor of Civil Law degree at the University of Oxford, graduating in 1962.

== Career ==
Bill Cornish in 1972

In 1962, Cornish was appointed Lecturer in Law at the London School of Economics (LSE) and was called to the bar at Lincoln's Inn the following year. He moved from the LSE to Queen Mary College, London, in 1969 to be Reader of Law, but returned to the LSE in 1970 when he was appointed Professor of English Law. In 1990, he became Professor of Law at the University of Cambridge and a fellow of Magdalene College, Cambridge. In 1995 was appointed Herchel Smith Professor of Intellectual Property Law and served in that chair until retiring in 2004. He was also President of Magdalene College from 1998 to 2001 and Director of the Centre for European Legal Studies in the university's Faculty of Law from 1991 to 1994.

== Personal life and death ==
Cornish died in Cambridge, England on 8 January 2022, at the age of 84.

== Honours and awards ==
Cornish is the subject of a Festschrift, Intellectual Property in the New Millennium: Essays in Honour of William R. Cornish, edited by David Vaver and Lionel Bently and published by Cambridge University Press in 2004. The University of Cambridge conferred on Cornish a higher doctorate (the LLD) in 1997, and he received an honorary LLD from the University of Edinburgh in 2005. He was appointed an honorary Queen's Counsel in 1997 and a bencher of Gray's Inn the following year. In 1984, Cornish was elected a Fellow of the British Academy and appointed a Companion of the Order of St Michael and St George in the 2013 Birthday Honours.
