= Cattini =

Cattini is a surname. Notable people with the surname include:

- Clem Cattini (1937–2026), English rock and roll drummer
- Ferdinand Cattini (1916–1969), Swiss ice hockey player, brother of Hans
- Hans Cattini (1914–1987), Swiss ice hockey player

== See also ==
- Cattani
- Tattini
