= Legal & Literary Society =

Canadian Student Association

The Legal & Literary Society
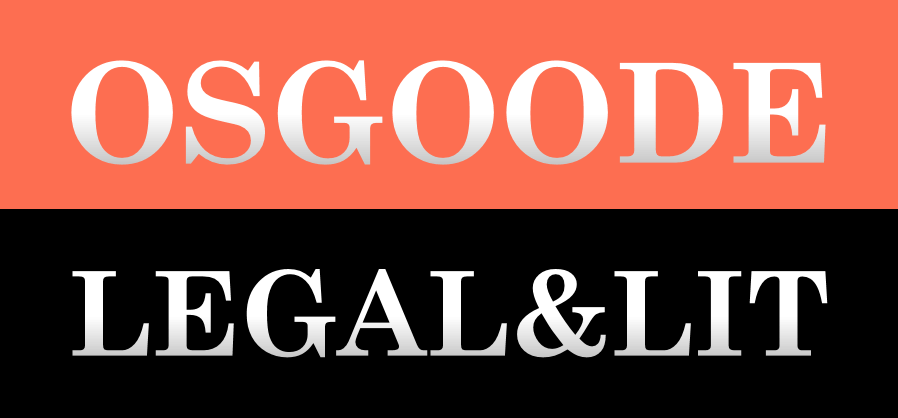
- Institution: Osgoode Hall Law School
- Location: Toronto, Ontario
- Established: 1876
- Members: 900
- Website: www.legalandlit.ca

The Legal & Literary Society (incorporated as The Legal and Literary Society of Osgoode Hall Law School) is the official student association of J.D. and LL.M. students at Osgoode Hall Law School. Founded in 1876, it is one of Canada's oldest professional student associations and pre-dates the official creation of the law school by 13 years. The Legal & Literary Society governs the numerous professional, athletic, social and extracurricular activities at Osgoode Hall Law School.

The Legal & Literary Society oversees and funds over fifty clubs run by law students, such as the Osgoode Constitutional Law Society, as well as several public interest organizations. It also publishes the Obiter Dicta, the official Osgoode Hall student newspaper, since 1929, and played a principal role in the creation of the Osgoode Hall Law Journal in 1958.

== History ==
Originally founded as the Osgoode Hall Literary & Legal Society, the Society was established as the successor of two dissolved literary societies, the York Literary Society and the Kingston Literary Society. These former organizations were primarily debating societies, particularly on matters pertaining to the law, and membership was restricted to those with family or professional connections to the law. The Legal and Literary Society became the official student society of the newly founded Osgoode Law School in 1901.

In the early years, before the law school was founded, the Society was an association of students-at-law at Osgoode Hall and funded by the Convocation of the Law Society of Upper Canada as a way to cultivate Ontario's legal elite. They held "at home" events and "musical literary evenings". Since, at the time, there was little formal legal education outside of the experience one received as an apprentice to a lawyer or judge, the Society also served as way for initiates to receive tutoring from the Bar and to undertake essays and examinations. After the Law Society ended formal lectures in 1878, the Society kept the legal education program alive by sponsoring lectures led by prominent members of the Toronto Bar, conducting examinations, and awarding prizes. The Law Society of Upper Canada continued to support the Society and allowed it to operate both as a surrogate law school and a gentlemen's club. Ultimately, through substantial lobbying by members of the Society, the Law Society re-established its formal law lectures in 1881 and later founded the third and final iteration Osgoode Hall Law School in 1889.

Shortly after Osgoode Hall Law School became affiliated with York University in 1969, the Legal & Literary Society established the Student Caucus of Faculty Council in order to ensure that law students continued to have influence within the auspices of university governance. The chair of Student Caucus serves as the vice-chair of Osgoode Hall's Faculty Council, and the members of Student Caucus serve on a variety of Osgoode faculty and staff committees.

== Governance ==
The Society is governed by a thirteen-member executive, all of whom are elected annually by the student body of the law school. The members of Student Caucus are also elected at-large.
