= Peppe =

Peppe is an Italian given name, nickname (often a hypocorism of Giuseppe) and a surname which may refer to:

== People ==
=== Given name ===
- Giuseppe Cataldo (1938−2011), Italian mobster
- Giuseppe Durato (born 1992), Italian manga artist
- Peppe Eng (born 1948), Swedish sports journalist and television presenter
- Peppe Lanzetta (born 1956), Italian actor
- Peppe Femling (born 1992), Swedish biathlete
- Giuseppe Piromalli (born 1921) (1921–2005), Italian crime boss
- Giuseppe Poeta (born 1985), Italian basketball player
- Giuseppe Vessicchio (1956–2025), Italian conductor, composer and television personality

=== Surname ===
- Audrey Peppe (1917–1992), American figure skater
- Carlos Peppe (born 1983), Uruguayan footballer
- Rodney Peppé (born 1934), British author and illustrator

== Fictional characters ==
- Peppe, in the 1860 opera Rita

== See also ==
- Peppes Pizza, a Norwegian pizza chain
- Pepe (disambiguation)
