= Cattani =

Cattani is an Italian surname. Notable people with the surname include:

- Costanzo Cattani, or Francesco Costanzo Cattani (1602–1665), Italian painter
- Federico Cattani Amadori (1856–1943), Italian Cardinal of the Roman Catholic Church
- Francesco Cattani da Diacceto (1466–1522), Italian Neoplatonist philosopher, grandfather of Francesco Cattani Bishop of Fiesole
- Francesco Cattani da Diacceto (1531–1595), Italian Bishop of Fiesole
- Gabriele Cattani, Italian astronomer
- Giacomo Cattani (1823–1887), Italian Catholic Cardinal and Archbishop
- Giuseppina Cattani (1859–1914), Italian microbiologist, co-creator of the Tizzoni-Cattani antitoxin to treat tetanus
- Heinz Cattani (1908–2001), Swiss bobsledder
- Leone Cattani (1906–1980), Italian lawyer, politician and anti-Fascist activist
- Oberdan Cattani (1919–2014), Brazilian football player
- Sophie Cattani, French actress

== See also ==
- Adamoli-Cattani fighter
