= Stephanie Ben-Ishai =

Canadian academic and lawyer

Academic background
- Education: LLB., Osgoode Hall Law School; LLM., 2003, Harvard Law School
- Thesis: Gender, consumer bankruptcy, and marital debt in Canada: drawing on the American experience (2003)

Academic work
- Institutions: Osgoode Hall Law School

Stephanie F. Ben-Ishai is a Canadian lawyer. She is a Distinguished Research Professor and full professor at Osgoode Hall Law School Osgoode Hall Law School. She was a Fulbright fellow and has authored or co-authored numerous books on insolvency, contract law, and corporate and commercial law.

== Early life and education ==
Upon graduating from Osgoode Hall Law School with her LL.B, Ben-Ishai served as a law clerk at the Court of Appeal for Ontario to Chief Justice McMurtry, Justice Laskin and Justice Sharpe. She also practiced law at Osler, Hoskin and Harcourt law firm before earning her LLM at Harvard Law School with a Fulbright fellowship.

== Career ==
In 2003, Ben-Ishai joined the faculty at her alma mater, Osgoode Hall Law School. By 2006, she was promoted to Associate Professor and received the Borden Ladner Gervais LLP Summer Research Fellowship. She also worked as a visiting professor at the University of Toronto and Monash University Faculty of Law. During the following academic year, she received the Osgoode Hall Leave Fellowship for 2008-09 and later earned an INSOL International Scholar appointment.

In 2010, she worked as a visiting professor at Monash University Law School and the University of Florida UF Levin College of Law. On April 7, 2015, Ben-Ishai received an Osgoode Hall Research Fellowships to complete a project on student loan debt.

Ben-Ishai took a sabbatical during the 2018–19 academic year and served as the Thomas Feeney Visiting Professor of Business Law at the University of Ottawa. On June 21, 2019, Ben-Ishai was appointed a York University Distinguished Research Professor "in recognition of her exceptional scholarly achievements and substantial impact on the field of bankruptcy law."
