= Geppi =

Geppi may refer to:

== People ==
=== Given name ===
- Geppi Cucciari (born 1973), Italian comedian and presenter

=== Surname ===
- Diane Geppi-Aikens (1962–2003) American athlete
- Michael Geppi, American entrepreneur and politician
- Steve Geppi (born 1950), American comic book publisher

== Other uses ==
- Geppi's Entertainment Museum, former pop culture museum in Baltimore, Maryland, owned by Steve Geppi

== See also ==
- Giuseppina (given name)
- Jeppe
