= Bepo =

Bepo or BEPO may refer to:

- BÉPO, a keyboard layout optimized for the French language
- Bereitschaftspolizei or "BEPO", anti-riot units of the German Federal Police and Landespolizei
- British Experimental Pile 0 or "BEPO", an early British nuclear reactor built by the Atomic Energy Research Establishment
- Bepo, a fictional polar bear who is a member and navigator of the Heart Pirates under Trafalgar Law in the Japanese shōnen manga series One Piece

== See also ==
- Beppo (disambiguation)
