= Tattini =

Tattini is an Italian surname. Notable people with the surname include:

- Eugene L. Tattini (born 1943), United States Air Force general
- Marco Tattini (born 1990), Italian footballer
- Paola Tattini (born 1958), Italian sports shooter

== See also ==
- Cattini
