= Beppe Sebaste =

Italian writer, poet and translator (1959–2026)

Beppe Sebaste (Italian pronunciation: [ˈbɛppe seˈbaste]; 3 June 1959 – 6 April 2026) was an Italian writer, poet, translator and journalist.

== Life and career ==
Sebaste was born in Parma on 3 June 1959. He graduated in aesthetics at the University of Bologna with Luciano Anceschi. Sebaste then received his PhD from the same university, before moving to Geneva, Paris, then Pietrasanta. He lived between Rome and a small town in Umbria, Italy.

Among his books, H. P. tells the inner story of Henri Paul, the driver involved in the Death of Diana, Princess of Wales; Porte senza porta (expanded as Il libro dei maestri, aka "the book of teachers" meaning in several and various disciplines) is a collection of personal meetings and some conversations which includes Bruno Hussar, Taizan Maezumi, Bruno Munari, Terry Riley, Steve Paxton, Alessandro Fersen, Daniel de Montmollin, Emmanuel Levinas, Luigi Ghirri, Elisabeth Bing, Raimon Panikkar, Mary Catherine Bateson, Frédéric de Towarnicki, and others. In 2004, he continued the meetings in a radio programme by Rai Radio 3, including Aldo Gargani, Alejandro Jodorowsky, Giulia Niccolai, etc.

He wrote for newspapers including, L'Unità and la Repubblica.

Sebaste died on 6 April 2026, at the age of 66.

== Works ==
Novels

- Tolbiac, Baldini & Castoldi, Milan 2002 ISBN 8884902592
- H. P. L'ultimo autista di Lady Diana, Quiritta, Rome 2004 ISBN 8884030269, new edition: Einaudi-Stilelibero, Turin 2007 ISBN 9788806189839; French translation: H.P. le dernier chauffeur de Lady Diana, Éditions du Seuil, Paris 2009 ISBN 978-2020969260 (translated by Nicolas Bouvier).

Short stories

- (with Giorgio Messori). L'ultimo buco nell'acqua. Racconti brevi. AElia Laelia, Reggio Emilia 1983
- Café Suisse e altri luoghi di sosta. Feltrinelli, Milan 1992 ISBN 8807014343
- Niente di tutto questo mi appartiene. Feltrinelli, Milan 1994 ISBN 8807014688
- Panchine. Come uscire dal mondo senza uscirne. Laterza, Bari 2008 ISBN 9788842086338
- La passeggiata. Manni, San Cesario di Lecce 2009 ISBN 9788862661539
- Oggetti smarriti e altre apparizioni. Laterza, Bari 2009 ISBN 9788842090373
- Fallire. Storia con fantasmi, self-published, distributed by Amazon, 2015 ISBN 9781515306344

Essays

- Lettere e filosofia. Poetica dell'epistolarità, Alinea, Florence 1998 ISBN 8881252686
- Porte senza porta. Incontri con maestri contemporanei. Feltrinelli, Milan 1997 ISBN 8807814447
- Il libro dei maestri. Porte senza porta rewind. Luca Sossella Editore, Rome 2010 ISBN 9788889829837

Poetry

- Come un cinghiale in una macchia d'inchiostro. Nino Aragno, Torino 2018 ISBN 9788884198860

Edited books

- Allo stato puro della rivoluzione. Il picchio, Bologna 1980
- (with Stefania Scateni). Non siamo in vendita: voci contro il regime. Arcana, Rome 2002 ISBN 8879662600

Translations

- Nicolas Bouvier. Il pesce-scorpione, Casagrande, Lugano 1991 ISBN 8877950390 and Marcos y Marcos, Milan 1991 ISBN 8871680472, new edition: Laterza, Bari 2006 ISBN 8842080462
- Jean-Jacques Rousseau. Le passeggiate del sognatore solitario. Feltrinelli, Milan 1996 ISBN 8807821362, new edition: 2012 ISBN 978-8807822599
- Emmanuel Bove. I miei amici. Feltrinelli, Milan 1991 ISBN 880705082X, new edition: 2015 ISBN 978-8807885204
