= Giuseppina d'Agostino =

Canadian lawyer and academic

Giuseppina D'Agostino
- Education: Osgoode Hall Law School, University of Oxford
- Occupations: Lawyer, legal scholar
- Employer: Osgoode Hall Law School
- Known for: Intellectual property law

Giuseppina (Pina) D'Agostino is a Canadian jurist, specializing in intellectual property law who teaches at Osgoode Hall Law School. In 2025 she took on a one-year term as an associate vice-president at York University. She is regularly called upon by the Canadian Federal and Provincial governments for advice and is a cited authority at the Supreme Court of Canada. In May 2026, the Minister of Justice and Attorney General of Canada announced her appointment to the Federal Court.

== Life ==
She earned an LL.B. at Osgoode Hall Law School and a Masters and D.Phil. degrees at the University of Oxford where she formerly lectured. She is a visiting scholar at the law school of Stanford University.

She is the author of Copyright, Contracts, Creators: New Media, New Rules (2010) and co-edited The Common Law of Intellectual Property: Essays in Honour of Professor David Vaver (2010) and Leading Legal Disruption: Artificial Intelligence and a Toolkit for Lawyers and the Law (2021).

She is the founder and Editor-in-Chief of the IPilogue, the first IP law blog of its kind. In 2023 she became the first vice-director of "Connected Minds: Neural and Machine Systems for a Healthy, Just Society", a new research project that received over $300 million in funding. She later became its director.

== Works ==
- D'Agostino, Giuseppina (2007). Fair Dealing After CCH (PDF). Canadian Heritage, Copyright Policy Branch. ISBN 978-0-662-46883-7.
- D'Agostino, Giuseppina (2008). "Healing Fair Dealing? A Comparative Copyright Analysis of Canadian Fair Dealing to UK Fair Dealing and US Fair Use" (PDF). McGill Law Journal. 53 (2). SSRN 1014404.
- D'Agostino, G. (2010). Copyright, Contracts, Creators: New Media, New Rules. Edward Elgar. ISBN 978-1-84980-520-9.
- Ng, C.; Bently, L.; D'Agostino, G. (2010). "Was There Ever a Common Law of Intellectual Property?". The Common Law of Intellectual Property: Essays in Honour of Professor David Vaver. Bloomsbury Publishing. ISBN 978-1-84731-593-9.
- D'Agostino, Giuseppina (Pina); Gaon, Aviv; Piovesan, Carole, eds. (2021). Leading Legal Disruption: Artificial Intelligence and A Toolkit For Lawyers And The Law. Thomson Reuters. ISBN 978-0-7798-9871-8.
