= Peppino =

Peppino may refer to:

== People ==
=== Given name ===
- Peppino D'Agostino, Italian guitarist
- Peppino De Filippo (1903–1980), Italian actor
- Peppino di Capri (born 1939), Italian popular music singer, songwriter and pianist
- Peppino Gagliardi (1940-2023), Italian singer
- Peppino Garibaldi (1879–1950), Italian soldier and grandson of Giuseppe Garibaldi
- Peppino Tirri (born 1956), Italian football agent registered with the football association of Italy
- Peppino Turco (1846–1907), Italian songwriter
- Peppino Spaghetti, main protagonist of the video game Pizza Tower

=== Surname ===
- Franco Peppino, (born 1982), Argentine football player

== Films ==
- Peppino, le modelle e chella là, 1957 comedy film directed by Mario Mattoli and starring Gino Bramieri
- Peppino e Violetta, 1950 Italian film directed by Maurice Cloche
- Totò, Peppino e la malafemmina ("Totò, Peppino and the bad woman"), Italian comedy film directed by Camillo Mastrocinque in 1956
- Toto, Peppino and the Fanatics (Italian: Totò, Peppino e le fanatiche), 1958 comedy film directed by Mario Mattoli and starring Totò

== See also ==
- Pepino, an edible fruit
- "Pepino the Italian Mouse", 1962 novelty song by Lou Monte
