= Osgoode Hall Law School =

Law school in Toronto, Ontario, Canada

- Coat of arms of the school
- Motto: Per jus ad justitiam (Latin)
- Motto in English: "Through law to justice"
- Type: Public law school
- Established: 1889; 137 years ago
- Parent institution: York University (1965–present)
- Dean: Trevor C.W. Farrow
- Faculty: 182
- Students: 905
- Location: Toronto, Ontario, Canada; 43.7707°N 79.5044°W
Colours
Pewter and Red
- Website: osgoode.yorku.ca
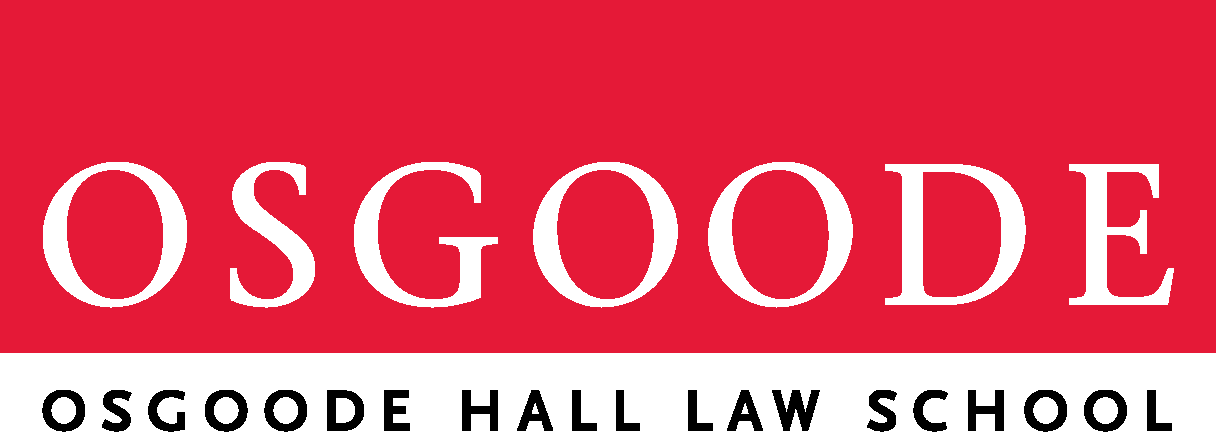

Osgoode Hall Law School, commonly shortened to Osgoode, is the law school of York University in Toronto, Ontario, Canada. It is home to the Law Commission of Ontario, the Journal of Law and Social Policy, and the Osgoode Hall Law Journal. A variety of J.D. LL.M. and Ph.D. degrees in law are available. Osgoode is widely considered to be one of the top law schools in Canada.

The law school's alumni include two Canadian prime ministers, four attorneys general, eight premiers of Ontario, four mayors of Toronto, eleven justices of the Supreme Court of Canada, four of whom were chief justices, and one Academy Award nominee. The current dean of the law school is Trevor C.W. Farrow.

== History ==
Osgoode Hall was named for William Osgoode, an Oxford University graduate and barrister of Lincoln's Inn. He was the first person to serve as the chief justice of Upper Canada.

The law school traces its origins back to the 1820s, and it counts the first Canadian prime minister (Sir John A. Macdonald) among its graduates. It was reorganized in 1889, and the Law Society of Upper Canada permanently established the law school on the site now known as Osgoode Hall. At the time, it was the only law school in Ontario, and this remained the case until the establishment of the University of Toronto Faculty of Law in 1949.

Ontario lawyers were originally required to attend Osgoode Hall in order to practise in the province. In 1855, the Law Society began requiring members to attend lectures given at Osgoode Hall (the building). In 1862, a law school opened in that building, only to close in 1868. It frequently opened and closed throughout the late 19th century. The law school at Osgoode Hall was only titled "Osgoode Hall Law School" in March 1924, when the Law Society of Upper Canada formally assigned it that name.

The school signed an agreement of affiliation with York University in 1965. It relocated from the Osgoode Hall building in downtown Toronto to York University's Keele Campus in 1968.

== Rankings and reputation ==
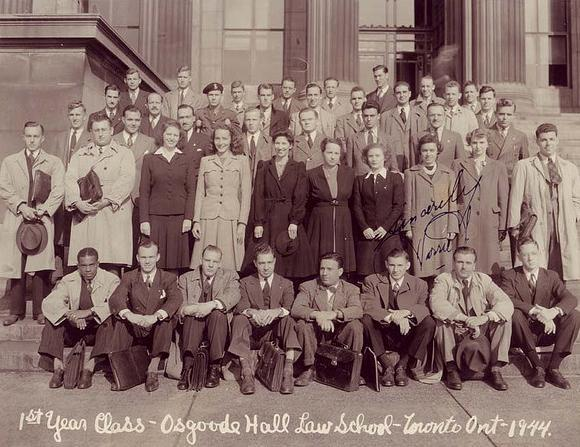
The first year class of Osgoode Hall Law School in 1944

Osgoode Hall is one of the most elite law schools in Canada. Times Higher Education ranked Osgoode Hall Law School 43 in the world in 2021. In 2022, Osgoode's joint JD/MBA program with the Schulich School of Business was named among the top 10 business and law programs in North America by FIND MBA.

In the 2008 rankings published by Canadian Lawyer Magazine, Osgoode was ranked first in Canada and was awarded high marks for the quality of its professors, flexible curriculum, and the diversity and relevance of course offerings. The faculty has been described as the "strongest in the country," and rank number one in Canada for faculty journal citations.

In 2011, 2012, 2013, Maclean's magazine has ranked Osgoode second amongst Canadian law schools.

In 2025, Osgoode Hall Law School ranked 4th overall in Canada and 2nd in Ontario based on rankings from Times Higher Education The school remains highly competitive with about 2600 applicants a year and an acceptance rate of 8-10%.

== Original building and current facilities ==
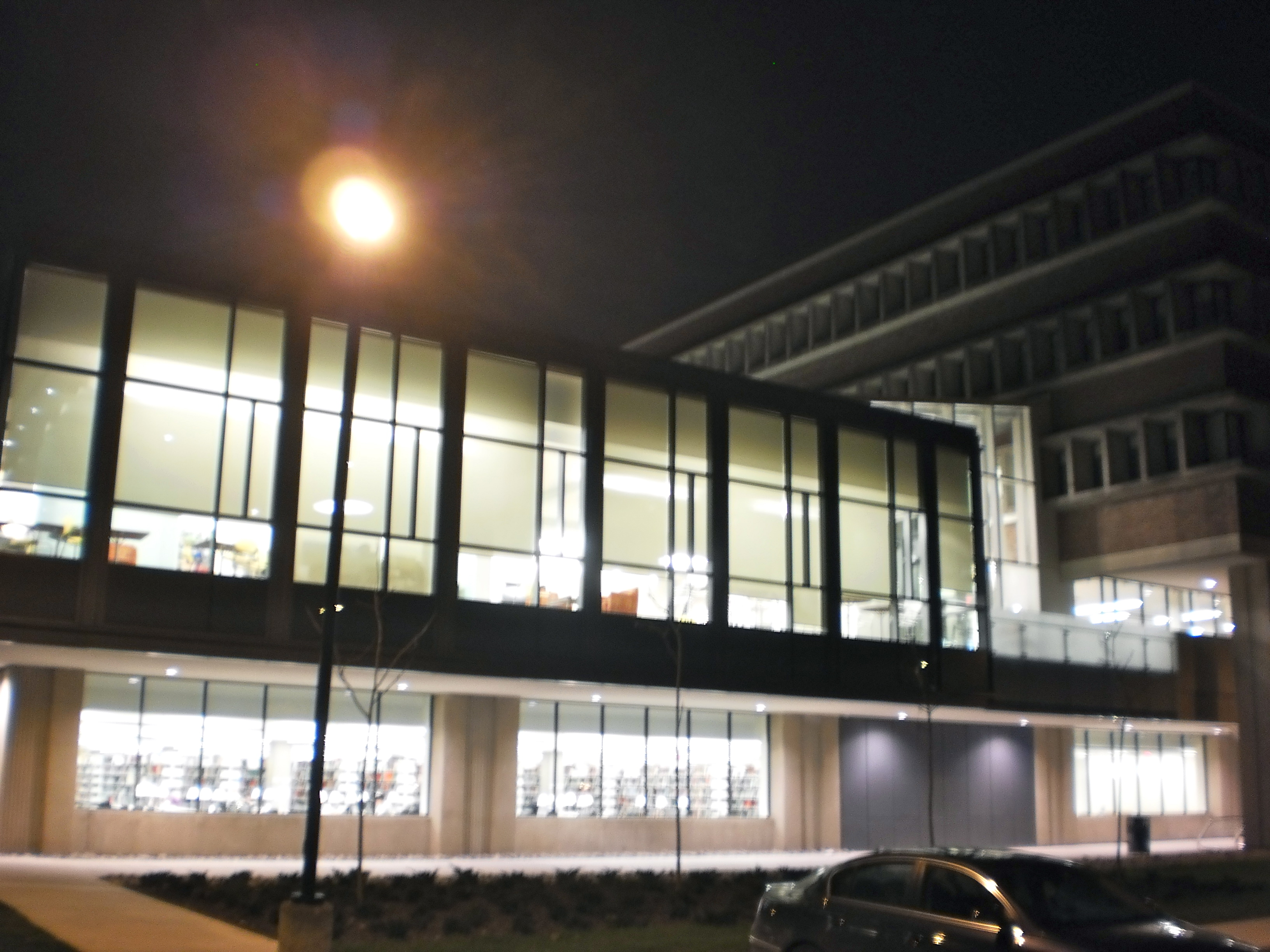
The law school is housed in a building named in honour of donor Ignat Kaneff.

For its first eight decades, Osgoode Hall Law School was located at Osgoode Hall at the corner of Queen Street and University Avenue. The structures at Queen and University (the earliest dating from 1832) are still known as Osgoode Hall. They remain the headquarters of the Law Society of Upper Canada, house the Court of Appeal for Ontario, the Divisional Court of the Superior Court of Justice, the offices of the Law Society of Ontario and the Great Library of the Law Society.

Currently, the law school is located on the Keele Campus of York University, in the Toronto suburb of North York. In May 2007, then-dean Patrick J. Monahan announced plans for an extensive renovation and extension of Osgoode Hall Law School involving a renovation of the existing building, and the addition of an additional wing.

The building was designed by architect Jack Diamond with the construction of the renovated building beginning in the summer of 2009. The project had been majorly funded by a $2.5 million gift by Ignat Kaneff, and the building has been renamed in his honour. The law school is referred to by York as its faculty of law. Osgoode's Professional Development offices and classrooms are based at 1 Dundas Street West in Downtown Toronto, overlooking Sankofa Square.

== Student life ==
The Legal & Literary Society, Osgoode Hall Law School's official student society, coordinates student activities both on and off campus. The organization also funds the student newspaper, Obiter Dicta, along with over fifty student clubs, with notable examples including the Osgoode Hall Criminal Law Society and the Osgoode Constitutional Law Society (OCLS), which was founded in 2014.

Osgoode hosts Professional Development Programs (OPD) which are located in downtown Toronto at 1 Dundas Street near the original Osgoode Hall building.

== Notable alumni ==
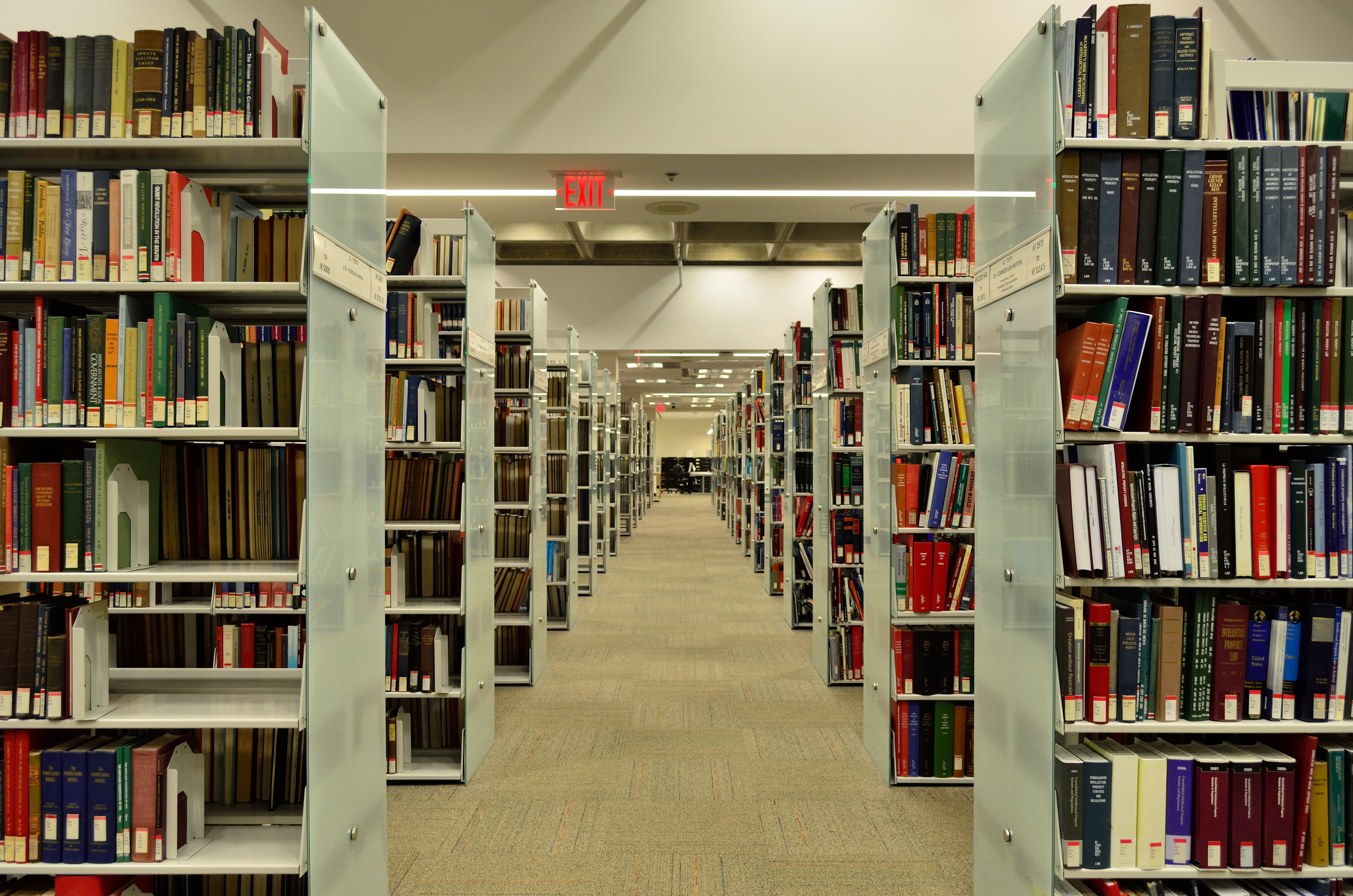
Osgoode Hall Law Library – lower level stacks

=== Prime Ministers ===
- William Lyon Mackenzie King
- Arthur Meighen

=== Supreme Court of Canada justices ===
- John Robert Cartwright, former Chief Justice
- Peter Cory, former Puisne Judge and former Chancellor of York University
- Sir Lyman Duff, former Chief Justice
- Frank Joseph Hughes, former Puisne Judge
- Wilfred Judson, former Puisne Judge
- Andromache Karakatsanis, current Puisne Judge
- Patrick Kerwin, former Chief Justice
- Bora Laskin, former Chief Justice
- Malcolm Rowe, current Puisne Judge
- Wishart Spence, former Puisne Judge
- Michelle O'Bonsawin, current Puisne Judge

=== Other judges ===
- John Arnup, Moderator for United Church of Canada, Justice at Ontario Court of Appeal
- George Ethelbert Carter
- Kim Carter, Chief Military Judge of the Canadian Forces
- (Jack Sydney George) Bud Cullen, Judge at Federal Court of Canada
- Charles Dubin, former Chief Justice of Ontario
- Daniel Dumais (LL.M.), Emeritus Lawyer distinction from Barreau du Quebec, Puisne Judge of Superior Court of Quebec
- Asher Grunis, President of the Supreme Court of Israel
- Sydney Harris (judge), activist lawyer and judge, President of the Canadian Jewish Congress
- Bill Hastings, Chief Justice of Kiribati, Chief Censor of New Zealand, District Court Judge of New Zealand
- Russell G. Juriansz, first South Asian appointed to Ontario Court of Appeal
- Harry S. Laforme, Justice at Ontario Court of Appeal
- Patrick LeSage, Chief Justice of Ontario Superior Court of Justice
- Malcolm Archibald Macdonald, Chief Justice of British Columbia
- Mark MacGuigan, Attorney General of Canada, Justice of the Federal Court of Appeal
- Goldwyn Arthur Martin, QC, Justice at Ontario Court of Appeal
- Roy McMurtry, Chief Justice of Ontario, Attorney General of Ontario, Canadian High Commissioner to the United Kingdom
- James Chalmers McRuer, Ontario Court of Appeal, Chief Justice at High Court of Justice of Ontario
- Charles Terrence Murphy, Judge at Ontario Superior Court, President of North Atlantic Assembly
- Willy Mutunga, former Chief Justice of Kenya
- Dennis O'Connor, Associate Chief Justice of Ontario
- George Bligh O'Connor, Chief Justice of Alberta from 1950 to 1956
- James O'Reilly, Federal Court Judge
- Coulter Osborne, arbitrator, Associate Chief Justice of Ontario
- John Richard, NAFTA Adjudicator, Chief Justice of the Federal Court of Appeal
- Lorne Sossin, Justice at the Ontario Court of Appeal
- Charles Allan Stuart, Justice of the Supreme Court of Alberta
- Michael Tulloch, Justice at the Ontario Court of Appeal
- Karen M. Weiler, past Judge Court Martial Appeal Court of Canada, Justice at Ontario Court of Appeal
- Sharon A. Williams, Judge ad litem at the International Criminal Tribunal for the Former Yugoslavia
- Warren Winkler, Chief Justice of Ontario

=== Premiers ===
- Bill Davis, 18th Premier of Ontario
- George Drew, 14th Premier of Ontario
- Ernie Eves, 23rd Premier of Ontario
- Howard Ferguson, 9th Premier of Ontario
- Leslie Frost, 16th Premier of Ontario
- William Howard Hearst, 7th Premier of Ontario
- Rachel Notley, 17th Premier of Alberta
- John Robarts, 17th Premier of Ontario

=== Government ===
- Gary Anandasangaree, Minister of Public Safety
- Todd McCarthy (politician), Member of Provincial Parliament for Durham, Parliamentary Assistant to the President of the Treasury Board, Deputy Government Whip
- John Black Aird, former Lieutenant Governor of Ontario, Canadian Senator and founding partner of Aird & Berlis LLP
- Lincoln Alexander, 24th Lieutenant Governor of Ontario
- Daniel J. Arbess, member of Council on Foreign Relations
- Oliver Mowat Biggar, co-founder of Smart & Biggar, first Chief Electoral Officer of Canada
- Leonard Braithwaite, member of Ontario Parliament
- Lionel Chevrier, Attorney General of Canada, President of Privy Council of Canada, High Commissioner to the UK
- Ward Elcock, Director of Canadian Security Intelligence Service
- Gordon Fairweather, Attorney General of New Brunswick, first Chief Commissioner of the Canadian Human Rights Commission
- Jim Flaherty, Minister of Finance of Canada
- Hugh Guthrie, Attorney General of Canada, Minister of National Defence
- Ross Hornby, former Ambassador of Canada to the European Union
- Ron Irwin, former Ambassador to Ireland
- James Kelleher, Solicitor General of Canada, Member of the Canadian Senate
- Judy LaMarsh, Secretary of State for Canada, broadcaster
- Allan Leal, President of the Empire Club of Canada, Rhodes Scholar
- Sir James Alexander Lougheed, Calgary businessman and Government Leader in the Canadian Senate
- Alexander Malcolm Manson, Attorney General of British Columbia, Judge
- John Matheson, M.P., Justice of Ontario, helped develop Canada's flag and the Order of Canada
- John Pallett, Chief Gov't Whip, leader of Canadian delegation to NATO
- Lawrence Pennell, Solicitor General of Canada
- Lionel Perez (politician), Montreal city councilor and member of Union Montreal
- Richard Rohmer, aviator, Air Force General, lawyer, author, Honorary Advisor to Chief of Defense Staff
- Dianne Saxe, environmental lawyer and scholar, Environmental Commissioner of Ontario
- Ian Scott, constitutional lawyer, Attorney General of Ontario
- Jagmeet Singh, Canadian politician, former Leader of the New Democratic Party of Canada
- Sinclair Stevens, banker, President of the Treasury Board
- John Tory, 65th Mayor of Toronto, Former President and CEO of Rogers Media Inc., Former Chairman of the CFL
- George Stanley White, former Speaker of the Canadian Senate
- James Worrall, Chair of IOC Commission on The Olympic Charter, President of the Canadian Olympic Committee
- Vincent Ho, Member of Parliament
- Godwin Chan, Regional and Local Councillor, Deputy Mayor of Richmond Hill, Ontario

=== Law ===
- Austin Cooper, criminal lawyer, defended Keith Richards in Toronto
- Marlys Edwardh, civil rights
- Fraser Elliott, founder of Stikeman Elliott, President of the Art Gallery of Ontario
- J. S. Ewart, lawyer, advocate for Canadian independence
- Edwin A. Goodman, founding partner of Goodmans
- Randal Graham, law professor, novelist
- Edward Greenspan, criminal lawyer
- Gordon Henderson, President, Canadian bar association, Chancellor, University of Ottawa
- Marie Henein, criminal lawyer, defended Jian Ghomeshi
- Jeffry House, refugee law, war resisters
- Gord Kirke, sports and entertainment lawyer
- M. David Lepofsky, disability and human rights lawyer
- John Rosen, criminal lawyer
- Stuart Alexander Henderson, successfully defended Gunanoot

=== Business ===
- Sir Edward Wentworth Beatty, president of the Canadian Pacific Railway
- Marshall A. Cohen, Director at Barrick Gold Corporation & Toronto-Dominion Bank, member Trilateral Commission
- Dame Moya Greene, Former CEO of Canada Post, Former CEO of Royal Mail
- Sergio Marchionne, CEO of Fiat Chrysler Automobiles
- Charles Peter McColough, CEO and Chairman of Xerox Corporation, member of Council on Foreign Relations
- John A. McPhail, founder and president of Great Lakes Power Company
- Jagoda Pike, former publisher of the Toronto Star
- Arthur Richard Andrew Scace, Chairman of Bank of Nova Scotia, director of Canadian Opera Company
- Kathleen Taylor, Chair of Royal Bank of Canada
- John S. D. Tory, founder of Torys and Director of A.V. Roe Canada

=== Arts ===
- Morley Callaghan, novelist
- Murray Cohl, co-founder of the Toronto International Film Festival
- Jeff Deverett, lecturer and film producer
- Daniel Iron, film and TV producer
- Jerry Levitan, Oscar nominee
- Tom MacInnes, poet
- Aaron Schwartz (Canadian actor)

=== Science/medicine ===
- Robert Elgie, Ontario Minister of Labour, became a neurosurgeon after becoming a lawyer

=== Scholarship ===
- Payam Akhavan, international human rights
- Constance Backhouse, legal scholar and historian, President of the American Society of Legal History
- Deborah Coyne, constitutional law and international relations
- Giuseppina d'Agostino, intellectual property
- Michael Geist, internet and privacy law
- Colleen Hanycz, principal of Brescia University College from 2008-2015, current university president of La Salle University
- James C. Hathaway, international refugee law
- Michael Mandel, law professor, international criminal law
- Lyal S. Sunga, international humanitarian law, international human rights law, international criminal law.
- Paul C. Weiler, Emeritus Professor of Law, Harvard Law School
- Alan Young, law professor, civil liberties
- Gus van Harten, law professor, administrative law

=== Sportspersons ===
- George Dudley, inductee of the Hockey Hall of Fame and executive for the Canadian Amateur Hockey Association

== Notable professors ==
- Louise Arbour, Supreme Court Justice, UN High Commissioner for Human Rights, Governor-General of Canada
- John Borrows, Indigenous legal scholar
- Jean-Gabriel Castel, private international law, decorated member of French Resistance
- Leslie Green, philosopher and legal scholar specializing in jurisprudence, also Emeritus Professor at Oxford University
- Peter Hogg, Canadian constitutional law, authored most-cited book at Supreme Court of Canada
- Gord Kirke, sports and entertainment lawyer
- Deborah McGregor, Whitefish Bay Ojibway environmentalist, educator
- Obiora Chinedu Okafor, international and human rights law, also UN Independent Expert on Human Rights and International Solidarity
- Angela Swan, contract law scholar, Officer of the Order of Canada
- David Vaver, intellectual property law, also Emeritus Professor at Oxford University
- Stephanie Ben-Ishai, insolvency, contract law, and corporate and commercial lawyer and author
- John Maxwell Evans, legal scholar and former judge of the Canadian Federal Court of Appeal

== Popular Culture ==
- Main character in Canadian legal drama, This Is Wonderland is a graduate of Osgoode Hall Law School.

== See also ==
- List of law schools in Canada

== Footnotes ==
- Lorne Sossin Accessed 13 October 2012.
- Dean of Osgoode 2010 Accessed October 2012.
