= Trevor C.W. Farrow =

American legal scholar

- Education: Princeton University (BA); University of Oxford (BA,MA); Dalhousie University (BLaws); Harvard University (MLaws); University of Alberta (PhD)
- Occupation: Legal scholar
- Known for: Dean and Professor at the Osgoode Hall Law School at York University
- Notable work: Member of the Bar of Ontario

Trevor C.W. Farrow is the dean and professor at the Osgoode Hall Law School at York University. He is also chairman of the board of Canadian Forum on Civil Justice (CFCJ). He is a member of the Bar of Ontario.

== Education ==
He holds a number of degrees:

- Bachelor of Arts from Princeton University
- Bachelor and Master of Arts from the University of Oxford
- Bachelor of Laws from Dalhousie University
- Master of Laws from Harvard University
- Doctor of Philosophy from the University of Alberta

He has published more than 32 research papers.
