= Di Giuseppe =

Di Giuseppe is an Italian patronymic surname, meaning "son of Giuseppe". People who share this surname include:

- Enrico Di Giuseppe (1932–2005), American operatic tenor
- Franco Di Giuseppe (1941–2021), Italian politician
- Marcus di Giuseppe (born 1972), Brazilian footballer
- Phil Di Giuseppe (born 1993), Canadian ice hockey player
