= Jeppe =

Jeppe may refer to several articles.

== Places ==
- Jeppe, Johannesburg, South Africa, named after Julius Jeppe; see:
  - Jeppestown, Gauteng
  - Jeppestown South, Gauteng
  - Jeppe High School for Girls
  - Jeppe High School for Boys

== People ==
- Jeppe (name)

== Fiction ==
- Jeppe of the Hill (da. Jeppe paa Bierget), a play by Ludvig Holberg, 1722.
  - Jeppe på bjerget (a film version of the play)
  - Jeppe: The Cruel Comedy (an opera based on the play)

== See also ==
- Geppi
