= Pina (name) =

Pina is a feminine given name and a Portuguese and Spanish surname. Notable people with the name include:

== Given name or nickname ==
- Pina Bausch (1940–2009), German choreographer
- Pina Carmirelli (1914–1993), Italian violinist
- Pina Gallini (1888–1974), Italian actress
- Pina Kollars, 21st century Austrian singer
- Pina Manique (1733–1805), Portuguese magistrate
- Pina Piovani (1897–1955), Italian stage and film actress
- Pina Renzi (1901–1984), Italian actress

== Stage name ==
- Pina Menichelli (1890–1984), Italian actress Giuseppa Iolanda Menichelli
- Pina Pellicer (1934–1964), Mexican actress Josefina Yolanda Pellicer López de Llergo

== Surname ==
- Clàudia Pina (born 2001), Spanish football player
- Daniel Bautista Pina (born 1981), Spanish football player
- João Pina (born 1981), Portuguese judoka
- Kevin Pina (footballer) (born 1997), Cape Verdean footballer
- Kevin Pina (journalist), American journalist
- Larry Pina (born 1947), American non-fiction writer
- Rúben Pina (born 2000), Cape Verdean footballer
- Rui de Pina (1440–1521), Portuguese chronicler
- Álex Pina (born 1967), Spanish writer and director

== See also ==
- João de Pina-Cabral (born 1954), a Portuguese anthropologist
- Maria do Céu Sarmento Pina da Costa, East Timorese politician
