= Giuseppe Cantersani =

Giuseppe Cantersani was an Italian engraver, active circa 1700 in Bologna.

He is known to have engraved on metal, and to have produced plates representing a painting of the Virgin, by Solimena, a Virgin and Child by Fratta, and a Virgin and Saint Anne by Sirani.
