= Giuseppe Bazzeghin =

Italian footballer

Personal information
- Date of birth: 15 February 1897
- Place of birth: Venice, Italy
- Date of death: 29 April 1945 (aged 48)
- Place of death: Venice, Italy
- Position: Goalkeeper

Senior career*
Years	Team	Apps	(Gls)
–1922	Venezia		
1922–1924	Bologna	9	(0)
1924–1926	Venezia		
- * Club domestic league appearances and goals

Giuseppe Bazzeghin (15 February 1897 – 29 April 1945) was an Italian professional footballer who played as a goalkeeper in Serie A for Bologna. He was killed during the final days of World War II.
