= Bepi =

Bepi may refer to:

- × Brassoepidendrum, an orchid hybrid genus abbreviated Bepi.
- Giuseppe "Bepi" Colombo (1920–1984), Italian scientist
- Bepi, Zahedan, a village in Iran
