= Beppe =

Italian given name and nickname

Beppe is a diminutive of the Italian name Giuseppe and may refer to:

== People ==
- Giuseppe Bergomi (born 1963), retired Italian footballer
- Beppe Carletti (born 1946), Italian musician, founder and keyboardist of the band I Nomadi
- Beppe Ciardi (1875–1932), Italian painter
- Beppe Costa (1941–2026), Italian poet and novelist
- Beppe Croce (1914–1986), Italian sailor
- Beppe Fenech Adami, Maltese politician
- Beppe Fenoglio (1922–1963), Italian writer
- Beppe Gabbiani (born 1957), Italian racing driver
- Beppe Gambetta (born 1955), Italian musician
- Beppe Grillo (born 1948), Italian activist, blogger, comedian, actor and politician
- Beppe Menegatti (1929–2024), Italian theatre director
- Beppe Sebaste (1959–2026), Italian writer, poet, translator, and journalist
- Beppe Severgnini (born 1956), Italian journalist, writer and columnist
- Giuseppe Signori (born 1968), Italian footballer
- Giuseppe Vessicchio (1956–2025), Italian conductor, composer and television personality

== Fictional characters ==
- Beppe, from Animal Crossing: Pocket Camp
- Beppe di Marco, fictional character from the BBC soap opera EastEnders, played by Michael Greco

== See also ==
- Beppe Wolgers (1928–1986), Swedish author, poet, translator, lyricist, actor, entertainer and artist
