= Giuseppe Coverlizza =

Italian footballer

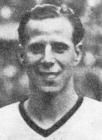
- Giuseppe Coverlizza

Personal information
- Date of birth: 4 August 1914
- Place of birth: Trieste, Italy
- Date of death: 16 December 1945 (aged 31)
- Place of death: Trieste, Italy
- Position: Forward

Senior career*
| Years | Team | Apps | (Gls) |
| 1935–1937 | Triestina | 1 | (0) |
| 1937–1938 | Liguria | 6 | (0) |
| 1938–1939 | Sanremese | | |
| 1939–1942 | Fiumana | | |
- * Club domestic league appearances and goals

Giuseppe Coverlizza (4 August 1914 – 16 December 1945) was an Italian professional footballer who played as a forward in Serie A for Triestina and Liguria. In 1945, he was shot dead by a police officer during a political fight.
