= Maria Pastori =

Italian mathematician (1895–1975)

- Education: University of Pisa
- Occupations: teacher and mathematician
- Scientific career
- Fields: rational mechanics

Maria Pastori (10 March 1895 - 17 April 1975) was an Italian mathematician and teacher. She was a Professor of Rational Mechanics at the University of Milan, and worked on differential calculus and the application of mathematics to electromagnets.

== Early life and education ==
Pastori was born in Milan on 10 March 1895, to a family of eight children. The family was of limited means and could not afford education for the children beyond what was provided by the public school system. Pastori excelled in mathematics, which was encouraged by one of her teachers, who aided her in getting a scholarship to Maria Agnesi School, a magisterial school (similar to a teacher's college).

After completing her studies at the magisterial school, Pastori then went on to teach elementary school near Milan. While teaching, Pastori studied further with her sister Giuseppina (who became a physician and biologist). At the age of twenty, Pastori sat for the state exams and earned a baccalaureate with highest honours. She earned a scholarship to the University of Pisa where she earned a doctorate, studying under geometer Luigi Bianchi. She earned laureate status on her dissertation. She supported herself during her studies by tutoring.

== Career ==
After earning her doctorate, Pastori became an assistant professor at the University of Milan, working her way up to professor, and eventually becoming the chair of the rational mechanics department. Most of Pastori's research and publications were focused on extending differential calculus as developed by Gregorio Ricci-Curbastro, as well as the application of mathematics to electromagnets.

Pastori was made an extraordinary professor in 1965, and in 1971 professor emerita.

She died on 17 April 1975 in Milan.
