= Osgoode Hall Law Journal =

- Discipline: Law
- Language: English

Standard abbreviations
- ISO 4: Osgoode Hall Law J.

The Osgoode Hall Law Journal (ISSN 0030-6185) is a law review affiliated with Osgoode Hall Law School of York University, Toronto, Canada. It has been publishing continuously since 1958.
