= Giuseppina Occhionero =

Italian politician

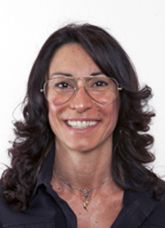

Member of the Chamber of Deputies
- In office 23 March 2018 – 13 October 2022
- Constituency: Molise

Personal details
- Born: 8 August 1978 (age 48) Larino, Italy
- Party: Free and Equal (2018-2019); Italia Viva (since 2019)
- Education: University of Bologna
- Occupation: Lawyer, politician

Giuseppina Occhionero (born 8 August 1978) is an Italian lawyer and politician.

== Biography ==
Graduated in Law at the University of Bologna, Occhionero began her career as a lawyer in Termoli.

She is elected city councilor in Campomarino and is then appointed assessor for cultural heritage and tourism.

At the 2018 general election, Occhionero is elected to the Chamber of Deputies with the left-wing coalition Free and Equal. She's the only elected deputy of LeU from Molise.
