= Aldo Gargani =

Italian philosopher (1933–2009)

Aldo Giorgio Gargani (1933 in Genova – 18 June 2009 in Pisa) was an Italian philosopher.

He studied philosophy at the Scuola Normale Superiore in Pisa, Oxford University, and Queen's College. He was professor of Aesthetics and History of Philosophy at the University of Pisa.

He is considered to be the most important Italian scholar of Wittgenstein. His writings introduced many British and American authors to an Italian audience.

== Works ==
- A. G. Gargani, Il sapere senza fondamenti. La condotta intellettuale come strutturazione dell'esperienza comune, ed.Mimesis 2009
- A. G. Gargani, Wittgenstein. Musica, parola, gesto, ed.Cortina Raffaello 2008
- A. G. Gargani, Mondi intermedi e complessità a cura di Alfonso M. Iacono, ed.Ets 2005
- A. G. Gargani, Wittgenstein dalla verità al senso della verità, ed. Plus 2003
- A. G. Gargani, Introduzione a Wittgenstein, ed. Laterza 2002
- A. G. Gargani, Il filtro creativo, ed. Laterza 1999
- A. G. Gargani, Sguardo e destino, ed. Laterza 1998
- A. G. Gargani, Hobbes e la scienza, ed. Einaudi 1997
- A. G. Gargani, Il pensiero raccontato. Saggio su Ingeborg Bachmann, ed. Laterza 1995
- A. G. Gargani, L'organizzazione condivisa. Comunicazione, invenzione, etica, ed. Guerini e Associati 1994
