= Giuseppa Scandola =

19th-century Italian Catholic religious order member

Venerable Maria Giuseppa Scandola MSV
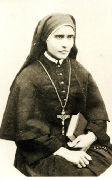
- Giuseppa Scandola circa 1877
- Born: Maria Teresa Scandola; 26 January 1849; Bosco Chiesanuova, Verona, Kingdom of Lombardy–Venetia, Austrian Empire
- Died: 1 September 1903 (aged 54); Lul, Upper Nile, Sudan

Maria Giuseppa Scandola, MSV, (26 January 1849 – 1 September 1903) was an Italian member of the Missionary Sisters of Verona, also known as the Comboni Missionary Sisters. She served in what is now South Sudan, where she offered up her life in 1903.

The cause for Scandola's beatification was opened by the Bishop of Verona in 1977. The cause has since been accepted for investigation by the Holy See, due to which she is referred to as venerable.

== Life ==
She was born Maria Teresa Scandola in 1849 in Verona, the daughter of Antonio Scandola and Giuseppina Leso. She met Daniel Comboni – later to be declared a saint – in 1871, who discussed with her his work of evangelization in Central Africa, and his vision of involving women in the mission. Scandola agreed to enter the religious order he envisioned to accomplish this, to be called the Institute of the Pious Mothers of Africa. She was the second woman to join the new foundation. In January of the following year, she entered the novitiate of the new religious order which Comboni had established in Verona, being given the religious habit and her new religious name of Maria Giuseppa. She professed perpetual religious vows on 19 March 1877.

Scandola and four other Comboni Sisters left Verona with Comboni the following 12 December for their mission in Africa, the first European women to serve as missionaries in that region of Africa. She then worked to help children with their education and spiritual development in various towns of Anglo-Egyptian Sudan. On 21 June 1903 she arrived in Lul, located on the banks of the White Nile, for her new mission, where she learned the Shilluk language. She taught the people that "there is no greater love than to lay down one's life for another" and that true love is this: "to know the Father and Jesus Christ who wants everyone to be saved".

Shortly after her arrival there, Scandola offered her own life to God in exchange for that of a young missionary priest, Giuseppe Beduschi, who, thanks to her generosity was then able to continue for many years his apostolic mission in Africa. She died in Lul on 1 September 1903 at the age of 54.

== Veneration ==
The cause for Scandola's beatification commenced in Verona after the Diocese of Malakal, where she had died, transferred the cause to her native Diocese of Verona on 7 October 1997. She received the title of Servant of God after the formal approval of the cause was granted by the Holy See on 23 April 2001. The process in Verona was ratified in 2003 and resulted in the submission of two parts of the positio to the Congregation for the Causes of Saints in 2009 and 2010, which then began to have the documentation evaluated.

A miracle attributed to Scandola's intercession was presented for investigation and the process was ratified on 17 October 2013. Pope Francis approved the formal decree that her life was one of heroic virtue on 12 June 2014, due to which she is considered venerable. A miracle attributed to her intercession is currently under investigation by the Congregation for the Causes of Saints.
