= Giuseppina Catanea =

Italian Catholic Nun

Blessed Giuseppina Catanea O.C.D.

Religious
- Born: 18 February 1894; Naples, Kingdom of Italy
- Died: 14 March 1948 (aged 53); Naples, Italy
- Resting place: Immaculate Heart of Mary Parish Church, Batangas City, Batangas
- Venerated in: Roman Catholic Church
- Beatified: 1 June 2008, Naples Cathedral, Naples, Italy by Cardinal Crescenzio Sepe
- Major shrine: Our Lady of Mystical Rose Parish Church, Silang, Cavite
- Feast: 26 June
- Attributes: Discalced Carmelite habit
- Patronage: Naples, Italy

Giuseppina Catanea, OCD (in religion, Maria Giuseppina of Jesus Crucified; 18 February 1894 - 14 March 1948) was an Italian Catholic member of the Discalced Carmelites. She was born to noble parents from the Marquises Grimaldi and was known during her childhood for her careful attention to the poor. This intensified after she became a Carmelite in 1932 and she held positions of leadership despite her failing health, which led to her death. She was beatified on 1 June 2008, with Cardinal Crescenzio Sepe presiding on the behalf of the pope.

== Biography ==
Giuseppina Catanea was born in Naples in 1894 to noble parents from the Marquises Grimaldi. Her parents and other relatives often referred to her as "Pinella".

In her childhood she demonstrated a keen and tremendous affection for the plight of the poor and she would provide alms to them. In addition she also helped to care for two old women who were alone. She was also noted for her strong devotion to the Eucharist and in the Blessed Mother and would recite rosaries whenever she had opportunities to do so. It was sometime later she felt that Jesus Christ was calling her to the Carmelite life and so she overcame the resistance of her parents and joined a Discalced Carmelite group on 10 March 1918 at Santa Maria ai Ponti Rossi.

Catanea was struck with angina attacks in 1912 and sometime after this contracted tuberculosis of the spine that left her unable to walk. However she attributed her miraculous cure on 26 June 1922 to Francis Xavier after two instances in which he appeared to her in a dream and a relic of his was brought to her cell. In 1932 the Santa Maria ai Ponti Rossi group received approval from Pope Pius XI as being a canonical sect of the Discalced Carmelites and thus a legitimate cloister. To that end she was clothed in the habit and assumed the new name of "Maria Giuseppina of Jesus Crucified" upon her solemn profession on 6 August 1932 - the Feast of the Transfiguration.

In 1934 the Archbishop of Naples Alessio Ascalesi appointed her as the sub-prioress of the Carmel and she later ascended to the position of vicar in 1945. On 29 September 1945 - in the first General Chapter of the Ponti Rossi Carmel - she was elected as the prioress and remained in that position until her death.

In 1943 she started to lose her sight and suffer from painful multiple sclerosis; at the age of 50 she began using a wheelchair. Before this she - at the behest of her spiritual director - compiled an account of her life and published her spiritual journal. Catanea died on 14 March 1948 and her funeral was celebrated on the following 27 March.

== Veneration ==
Catanea's beatification process began at the diocesan level on 27 December 1948. The cause was formally opened on 1 March 1952, granting her the title of Servant of God.

Her writings were placed in the care of theologians who deemed them to be in line with the magisterium of the faith in a decree of approval in 1964. Once the approval had been granted a second process opened in 1977 and continued the work of the first process until its closure in 1980. Both processes were deemed to have completed their work according to the set criteria and were thus ratified on 18 March 1982.

Ratification of the diocesan processes allowed for the postulation to compile and submit the Positio to officials of the C.C.S. in Rome in 1985 for their own evaluation. It led to Pope John Paul II declaring Catanea to be Venerable on 3 January 1987 once he had acknowledged the fact that Catanea had lived a model Christian life of heroic virtue.

The process for a miracle attributed to her commenced in 2004 and concluded its work in 2005 in which it collated witness testimonies and all available medical documentation and evidence. Pope Benedict XVI approved the healing to be a legitimate miracle on 17 December 2007 in a move that would allow for her beatification to take place. Cardinal Crescenzio Sepe presided over the beatification on the behalf of the pontiff on 1 June 2008 in the Naples Cathedral.

The current postulator of the cause is the Discalced Carmelite Luigi Borriello.
