= Giuseppina Cattani (physician) =

Italian bacteriologist, physician

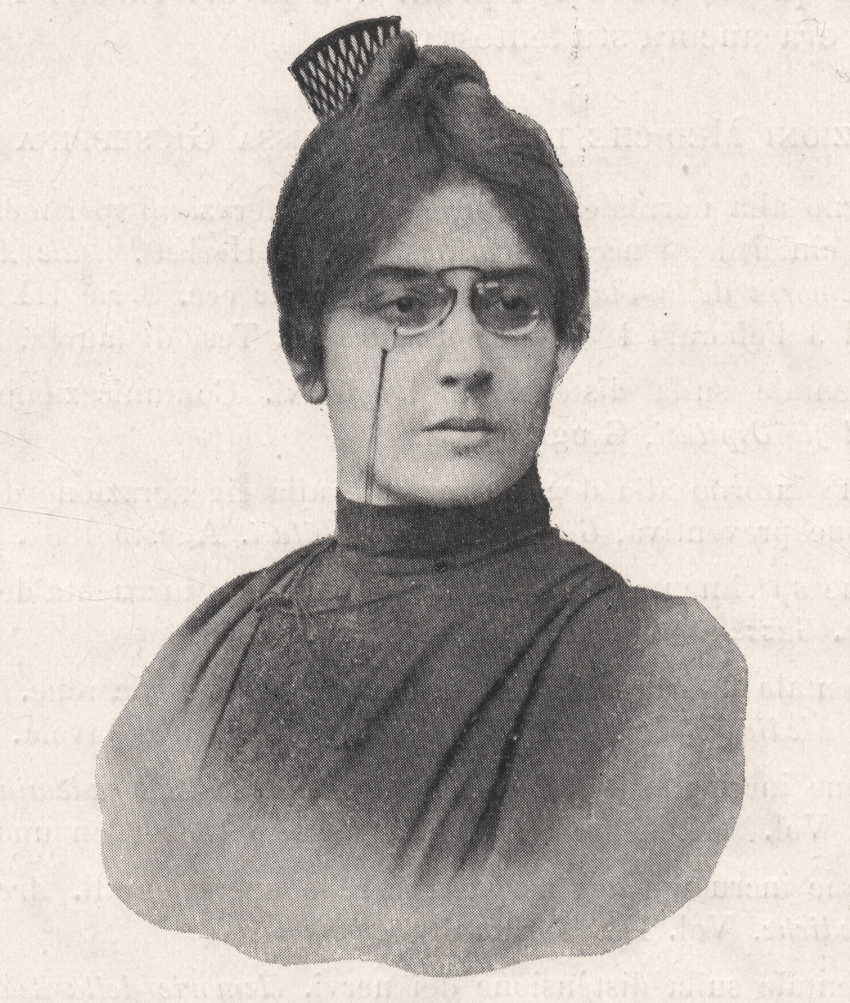
- Born: 26 March 1859; Imola, Italy
- Died: 9 December 1914 (aged 55); Imola, Italy
- Burial place: Piratello Cemetery
- Other name: Peppina
- Education: University of Bologna
- Occupations: Bacteriologist, physician
- Known for: Tizzoni-Cattani antitoxin

Giuseppina Cattani (1859–1914) was an Italian microbiologist and the first woman to earn a medical degree from the University of Bologna becoming one of the few women to become an Italian physician during the late 1880s. She is remembered for her bacteriology studies on tetanus. Together with her mentor Guido Tizzoni, she carried out tetanus research on guinea pigs, identifying what was later called the Tizzoni-Cattani antitoxin which became a basis for the treatment of the disease.

== Biography ==
Giuseppina Cattani, known as “Peppina,” was born in Imola, Italy, on 26 March 1859, into a poor family. She was the eldest of three sisters. Her father, Tullio worked occasionally as a tailor and a prison guard, and her mother Teresa Baratta was a midwife. As a very young woman in Imola, Cattani participated in political rallies and strikes to draw attention to the lot of the poor, and later in Bologna she intensified her political militancy in internationalist women's groups, to the point of being registered by the police. However, she soon backed off from her political activities so she could pursue her medical studies.

She graduated from the Luigi Galvani Classical High School in Bologna in 1878 and enrolled in the University of Bologna's Faculty of Medicine even though until that time, no women had graduated from the school. In her studies, Cattani demanded excellence from her work. For example, after learning she had achieved top marks on an anatomy exam, she asked to retake it and earned honors the second time.

In 1884, even before she graduated from the University of Bologna, she was appointed assistant in the school's general pathology laboratory, directed by Professor Guido Tizzoni. There, she conducted her first histophysiological investigation and published the results with him (he was the paper's first author and she was listed as second author). Later, the paper was presented to the Academy of Science.

Cattani was the first woman in the Kingdom of Italy to get a private university lectureship (libera docenza) in medicine. She did so first in Turin, and later it was transferred to Bologna.

=== Nervous system thesis ===
Her first extensive scientific studies concerned the peripheral nervous system (in particular the bloody and bloodless stretching of nerves). That became the topic of her degree thesis, which focused on Pacinian corpuscles in birds. Her thesis (featuring her own, hand-drawn illustrations) was titled, Research on the normal texture and experimental alterations of the Pacinian corpuscles of birds (Herbst Corpuscles). Memoirs of Giuseppina Cattani, Student of Medicine and Surgery in Bologna, Rome, Tipo del Salviucci, 1884.

=== Cholera studies ===
Cattani became involved in cholera research during Italy's second epidemic of the 1880s when the disease proved to be fatal to most victims. In her 1886 study, she examined 24 people affected by what was then called the Asiatic disease, all presenting cholera vibrios. In the second article on cholera dated November 1886, she described (in collaboration with Tizzoni) the transmissibility of the disease from mother to fetus; thanks to the opportunity to study a five-month-old fetus expelled by the mother three days after the mother became ill. Thus, Cattani was able to demonstrate that the transmission of the cholera infection occurred through the blood, and was not localized in the intestines.

=== Tetanus research ===
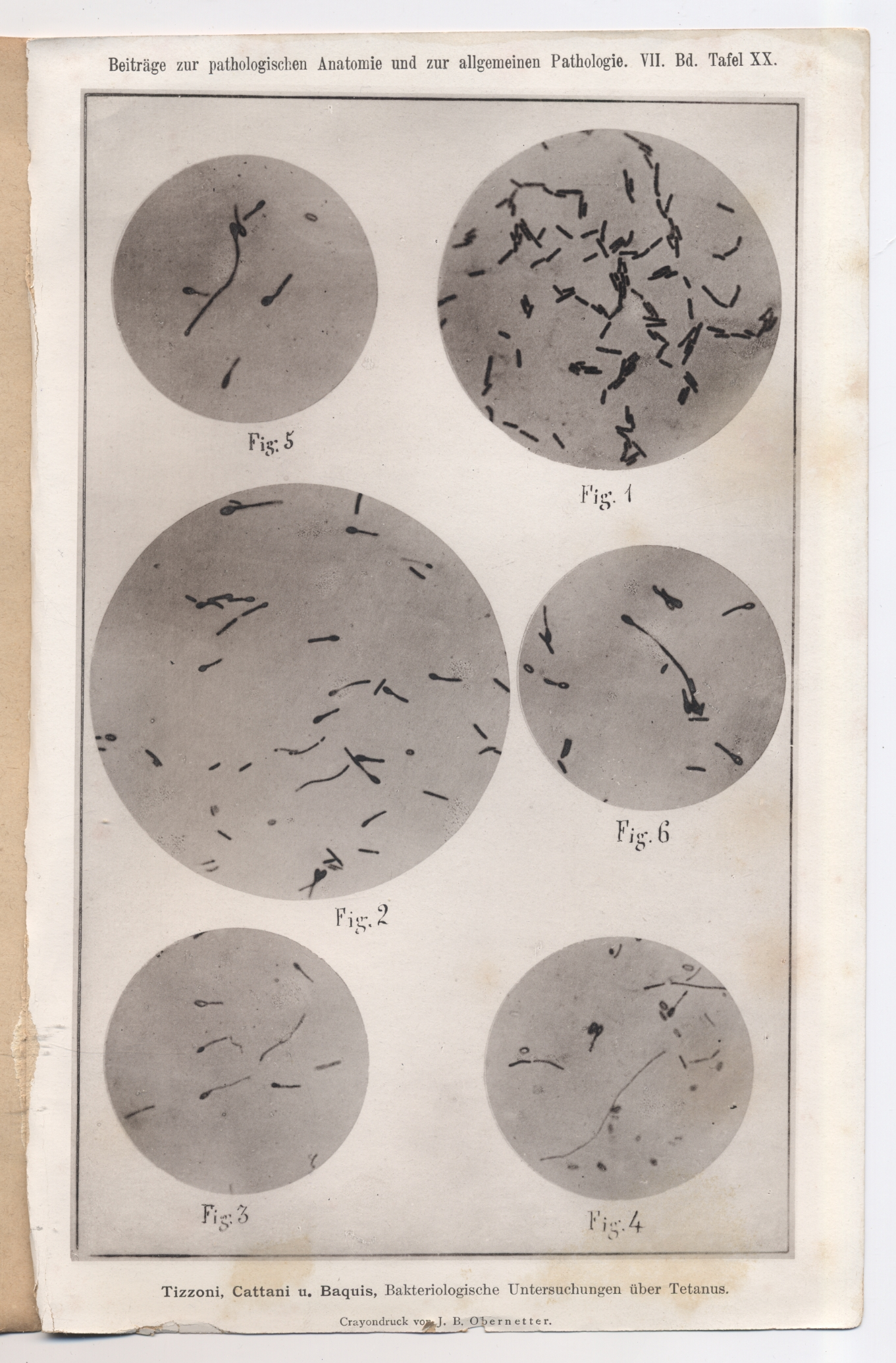
Microphotographs of tetanus on a page extracted from Bacteriological investigations into tetanus (1889)

From 1890 onwards, Cattani and Tizzoni dedicated themselves to researching tetanus. Cattani and Tizzoni, later dedicating themselves to the study of the diffusion of the tetanus virus in the organism, demonstrating that it was not a blood parasite. The results of these writings on tetanus were translated and expanded in the long memoir Bakteriologische Untersuchungen über den Tetanus, which proved interesting both for its indisputable scientific value of European scope and because it was the first work by Cattani in which photographs and microphotographs appeared. Subsequently, Cattani and Tizzoni began to carry out research on possible therapies to combat the tetanus pathogen whose "mortality rate, before the advent of serum therapy, was 85 percent."

In 1891, in the lecture titled “On the way of conferring immunity against tetanus to some animals” they presented their main results, including the demonstration that the blood serum of an immune animal could cancel the toxicity of filtered tetanus cultures. They tried, with success, to make some animals immune. From that moment on, all the research Cattani dedicated herself to had as its main aim the attempt to transfer her positive laboratory results to humans. According to Passione,

"Based on the results of clinical and laboratory research on tetanus, the two scientists hypothesized that contact with the pathogen could cause the formation of a special antitoxin (the "Tizzoni-Cattani antitoxin") in the blood serum of experimentally infected guinea pigs."

In Bologna, she taught university courses for about ten years, but she was never allowed to advance beyond the role of assistant to Tizzoni despite the "extraordinary results achieved through her research." According to Dröscher, at that time "male professors continued to regard women scientists mainly as (skilled) subordinate collaborators."

=== Final years ===
By 1897, she was widely published and at the height of her career and international success. In spite of those achievements, Cattani retired to her hometown of Imola, where she was invited to direct the department of radiology, pathological anatomy and bacteriology at Imola Hospital. She also worked privately as a gynecologist. One of her tasks at the Santa Maria della Scaletta hospital was to work as a medical dissector in the laboratory. She lived alone for 20 years.

She died at 55 in Imola on 9 December 1914 after a long illness. She is buried in the Famedio area of the Piratello Cemetery.

== Honors and distinctions ==
- Her studies of Pacinian corpuscles earned her the Vittorio Emanuele Prize in 1884 for outstanding achievement.
- She was the first woman to be appointed a member of the Medical-Surgical Society of Bologna (1886).
- The analysis laboratory at the Santa Maria della Scaletta Hospital in Imola was named after Giuseppina Cattani in 2002.

== Selected works ==
Many of her publications on cholera and tetanus (18 of her 23 works), were co-authored by Guido Tizzoni.

- Some research on the tenacity of the cholera virus (1887)
- Research on cholera infection determined by the blood ducts (1887)
- Experimental research on the generalization of cholera infection (1887)
- Bacteriological research on tetanus (1889)
- On the morphological characters of the bacillus of Rosenbach and Nicolajer (1889)
- The etiology of tetanus (1889)
- Further research on tetanus (1889)
- Bakteriologische untersuchungen über das Tetanusgift (1890)
- On the properties of tetanus antitoxin (1891)
