= Giuseppe Frazzetto =

Art critic

Giuseppe Frazzetto (born in 1955 in Catania, Italy) is an art critic, philosopher, and Professor of History of Art. He teaches History of Contemporary Art, History of New Media, History and Theory of Videogame at the Accademia di Belle Arti of Catania.

== Biography ==
He started out as a critic in 1980, contributing to the daily newspaper Giornale del Sud; then spent many years as an art critic for the daily newspaper La Sicilia. He has also contrived to art magazines such as Segno, Il giornale dell'arte, Arte e critica, Tema celeste, Terzoocchio, Apeiron and TribeArt.

He has mounted several contemporary art exhibitions based on the link between art and criticism and has published essays based on the connection between globalization and local artistic evolutions. The interaction between technology, aesthetics and “Third Estate of the Art” is another main theme of his writings.

== Selected works ==
- Arte a Catania, 1921-1950, Pellicanolibri, 1984
- Solitari come nuvole. Arte e artisti in Sicilia nel '900, Maimone, 1988, ISBN 978-88-7751-014-3
- Museo. Aporia dell’immagine, De Martinis & co. 1994. ISBN 978-88-8014-013-9
- La questione siciliana, Maimone 1997.
- L’implosione postcontemporanea. L’arte nell’epoca del web globale, Città aperta 2002.
- L’invenzione del nuovo. Caratteri fondamentali dell’arte contemporanea, G. Maimone, 2004, ISBN 978-88-7751-221-5
- Gibellina. La mano e la stella, Fondazione Orestiadi, 2007, ISBN 978-88-95098-02-9
- Per una teoria degli IDHE. Introduzione ai videogiochi, ed.it. 2010.
- Molte vite in multiversi. Nuovi media e arte quotidiana, Mimesis, 2010, ISBN 978-88-575-0291-5
