= Giuseppina Osenga =

Italian painter

Giuseppina Osenga (19th-century) was an Italian painter, mainly of vedute and landscapes.

== Biography ==
She was a resident of Parma. Among her works are: Veduta near Parma; Cascata del Montmorency, Canada, and Ponte d'Altaro, exhibited in 1870 at Parma. The name appears in the 1889 baptismal records of the Cathedral of Novara as the wife of Ennio Ortalli, and mother of Federico Guglielmo Maria Ortalli. There is a notice of someone with the same name living in Florence in 1931.
