= Peppino Tirri =

Italian football agent (born 1956)

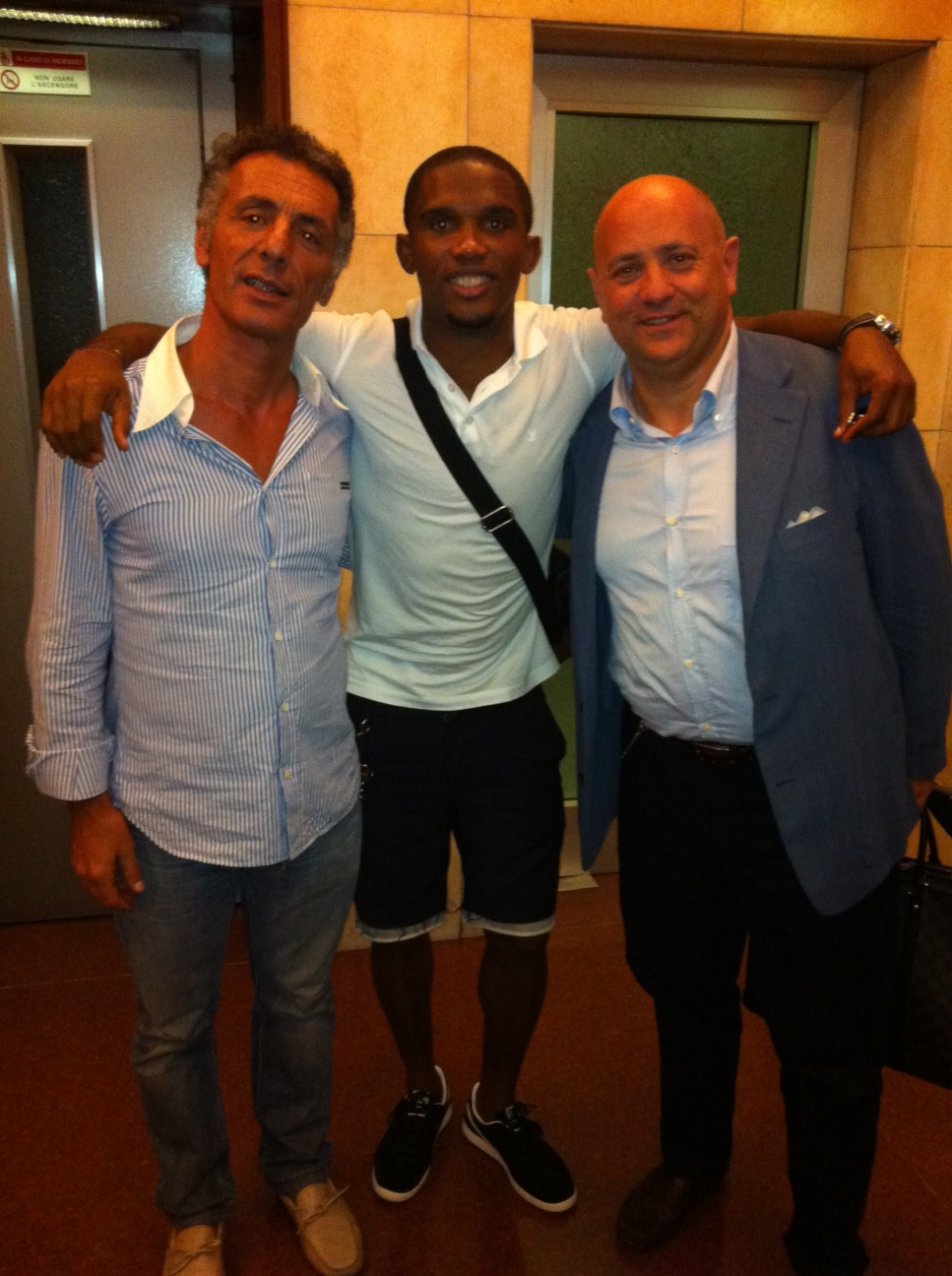
- Peppino Tirri (left) with Samuel Eto'o (middle) in 2011
- Born: 14 December 1956 (age 68); Licata, Italy
- Occupation: Sports agent

Peppino Tirri (born 14 December 1956) is an Italian football agent who is registered with the Italian Football Federation. He is known for representing international players and arranging transfers. Since August 5th, 2012 he has served as president of POFC Botev Vratsa.

== Early life ==
Tirri was born in Licata, Sicily. He played football in Serie B before pursuing a career in sports management. He is the father of Luigi Tirri.

== Club administration ==
In 1992, Tirri became the CEO of Licata Calcio, which played in Serie C2, the fourth tier of Italian football.

== Career as a football agent ==
Tirri has been active in player representation and transfer negotiations since the 1990s. He is noted for specializing in transfers between the Spanish and Italian leagues. His connections, including reportedly with Real Madrid’s president Florentino Pérez, have allowed him to broker several cross-border moves that might not be typical for some agents.

=== Summary of major transfer deals ===
Date	Player	New club	Previous club
2000	Enzo Maresca	Juventus FC	West Bromwich Albion
2001	Gaizka Mendieta	SS Lazio	Valencia CF
2002	Rivaldo	A.C. Milan	FC Barcelona
2004	Esteban Cambiasso	Inter Milan	Real Madrid
2004	Walter Samuel	Real Madrid	Roma
2005	Walter Samuel	Inter Milan	Real Madrid
2005	Cicinho	Real Madrid	São Paulo
2005	Luís Figo	Inter Milan	Real Madrid
2005	Santiago Solari	Inter Milan	Real Madrid
2005	Thomas Gravesen	Real Madrid	Everton
2006	Antonio Cassano	Real Madrid	Roma
2009	Wesley Sneijder	Inter Milan	Real Madrid
2011	Gabriel	Resende Futebol Clube	Juventus
2011	Samuel Eto'o	Inter Milan	Anzhi Makhachkala

=== Notable transfers and associations ===
==== Association with Florentino Perez ====
In 2004, Florentino Perez was re-elected as president of Real Madrid. During his presidency, there were about a dozen transfers conducted by Tirri between the Spanish club and Italy, especially with Inter Milan.

==== Samuel Eto'o ====
During the summer of 2011, Tirri oversaw the transfer of Samuel Eto'o from Inter Milan to Anzhi Makhachkala. The deal was notable in Europe for its worth: a fee of €22 million and salary of €10 million a year for 3 years. According to reports, the agreement made Eto’o one of the highest-paid footballers in the world at the time.
