= Giuseppina Pastori =

Italian physician

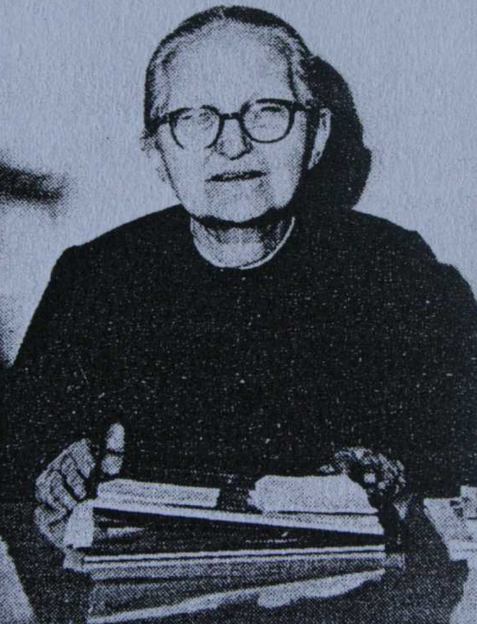
- Education: University of Milan; University of Pavia
- Occupations: physician and biologist
- Scientific career
- Fields: histology

Giuseppina Pastori (12 October 1891 – 13 July 1983) was an Italian physician and biologist. She worked at the University of Milan, researching histology, and then became a lecturer of histology and professor of biology at the Università Cattolica del Sacro Cuore. She was initially denied permission to take up the role by the Vatican. Her younger sister, Maria Pastori, was professor of mathematics at the University of Milan.

== Life ==
Pastori was born in Milan, Italy, in 1891 to a family of eight children. Her father was a groundskeeper, and her mother a lacemaker. Pastori attended public schools in Milan until the age of eight, and the family encouraged the children to study a trade following this mandatory schooling. Pastori declared her intention to study medicine, which was summarily forbidden by her mother. Pastori was tutored in mathematics, physics, and chemistry, among other subjects, by her sister Maria (who would later go on to become a mathematics professor), prior to attending the University of Milan and the University of Pavia. She earned her medical doctorate in 1921. Pastori wrote an account of her experiences during her obstetrics training, which included her frustration that the overnight sleeping areas were limited to the male students, which meant she missed births that happened at night. As many births happened at night, and obstetric students were required to attend two births before qualifying, this caused weeks of delay for Pastori. Tired of waiting, she eventually asked to sleep in the ward so that she could be available for night deliveries.

After her doctorate, she took a job at the University of Milan, where she started research into histology. In addition to her role at the university, Pastori took on a volunteer role at the hospital in Milan, and later a paid role at a nursing home. She was later granted a scholarship from the Italian Medical Women's Association, which afforded her access to the histology laboratory at the University of Rome. In 1930 Pastori became a lecturer of histology and professor of biology at the Università Cattolica del Sacro Cuore. This role required permission from the Vatican; however, initially it was refused. After Pastori referred to the precedent of Maria Gaetana Agnesi, (Note: Agnesi was granted the chair of the mathematics and natural philosophy department of the University of Bologna in 1750.) the Vatican gave permission for Pastori to take on the roles.

Pastori retired in 1961, but continued to publish and lecture into her seventies. She died in 1983.
