= David Vaver =

Canadian academic

David Vaver CM is a lawyer and legal scholar in the field of intellectual property law. He is a professor of law at Osgoode Hall Law School as well as Emeritus Professor of Intellectual Property & Information Technology Law at the University of Oxford, Emeritus Fellow of St. Peter's College, Oxford and former director of the Oxford Intellectual Property Research Centre.

David Vaver is the founder and Editor-in-Chief of the Intellectual Property Law Journal and the author of Property Law: Copyrights, Patents, Trademarks (Irwin Law 2n ed. 2011) among other books in the area of I.P.

He obtained an LL.B. from University of Auckland, a J.D. from the University of Chicago and an M.A. from the University of Oxford.

In 2016, Vaver was appointed into the Order of Canada with the grade of member, one of Canada's highest civilian honours.
