= Dan Payne (disambiguation) =

Dan Payne (born 1972) is a Canadian actor.

Dan Payne may also refer to:

- Dan Payne (Canadian football) (born 1966), Canadian football player, wrestler
- Dan Payne (rugby union) (born 1972), American rugby player, coach, and administrator

== See also ==
- Danny Payne (1957–2005), American footballer
- Daniel Payne (1811–1893), American bishop and educator
- Daniel Payne (cricketer) (born 1978), Australian cricketer
- Daniel Panetta (born 1992), also known as Danny Payne, Canadian singer
