= Josephine =

Josephine may refer to:

== People and fictional characters ==
- Josephine (given name), a given name, including a list of people and fictional characters with the name
- Josephine (singer), stage name of Greek pop singer Jessica Josephine Wendel (born 1990)
- Josephine "Josie" Valeri, American soccer player (born 2001)

== Places ==
- Josephine, Texas, United States
- Josephine County, Oregon, a county located in the U.S. state of Oregon
- Josephine Peak, a mountain in California
- Mount Josephine (disambiguation)

== Films ==
- Josephine (2001 film), an English-language Croatian film directed by Rajko Grlić
- Joséphine (2013 film), a French film directed by Agnès Obadia
- Josephine (2026 film), an American film directed by Beth de Araújo

== Music ==
=== Albums ===
- Josephine (album), album by Magnolia Electric Co.

=== Songs ===
- "Josephine" (Wayne King song), a 1951 song, recorded by many artists including Les Paul and Ray Charles
- "My Girl Josephine", by Fats Domino, also known as "Josephine" and "Hello Josephine", recorded by many artists
- Josephine (Too Many Secrets)", a song by Jon English, 1982
- "Josephine" (Chris Rea song), a 1985 song
- "Josephine" (Terrorvision song), a 1998 song
- "Josephine", a 1955 song from the musical Silk Stockings, recorded by Gretchen Wyler, and covered by Pearl Bailey in 1959
- "Josephine", a 1965 song by Shawn Elliott
- "Josephine", a 1966 song by Dino, Desi & Billy
- "Josephine", a 1976 song by String Driven Thing
- "Josephine", a 1991 song by The Magnetic Fields from the album Distant Plastic Trees
- "Josephine", a 1996 song by The Wallflowers from the album Bringing Down the Horse
- "Josephine", a 1999 song by Tori Amos from the album To Venus and Back
- "Josephine", a 2015 song by Frank Turner from the album Positive Songs for Negative People
- "Josephine", a 2015 song by Richard Thompson from his album Still
- "Josephine", a 2019 song by McFly from the album The Lost Songs

== Other uses ==
- Operation Josephine B, a 1941 attack on an electricity substation in German-occupied France
- Hurricane Josephine, several hurricanes
- "Josephine", an episode of the television series Servant
- An individual interested in Josephology, the theological study of Saint Joseph

== See also ==
- "Goodnight Sweet Josephine", a song by the Yardbirds
- "Yes Tonight Josephine", a single by Johnnie Ray
- "Josefin" (song), a song by Albin Lee Meldau, rerecorded in English as "Josephine"
- Josephines
- Josefina (disambiguation)
- Josephina (disambiguation)
- Josie
