= Maravilla =

Maravilla is a name that is Spanish for "wonder". It may refer to:

== Entertainment ==
- Pais Maravilla, album by Magos Herrera
- Maravilla (film), 1957 Spanish language comedy/musical
- La Maravilla, novel by Alfredo Vea, Jr.

== Persons ==
- Delio "Maravilla" Gamboa Rentería, Colombian footballer
- Lady Maravilla, Mexican luchadora
- Luis Maravilla, Spanish composer
- Sergio Martínez, Argentinian boxer known as "Maravilla"
- Arcángel, American singer also known as "La Maravilla"

== Places ==
- Cerro Maravilla, Puerto Rican mountain
- Maravilla Tenejapa, a city in Chiapas, Mexico
- A neighborhood in East Los Angeles, California

- Maravilla station, the Los Angeles Metro Rail station in East L.A. that serves the Maravilla neighborhood

== See also ==
- Maravilla Tenejapa, a town
- Maravillas (disambiguation)
- Maravilha (disambiguation)
