= Josefina =

Josefina is a female name, a feminine form of Joseph. It may refer to:

- Josefina Passadori, Argentine writer
- Josefina de la Torre, Spanish poet, novelist and opera singer
- Josefina Klinger Zúñiga (born 1965), Colombian environmentalist
- Josefina Lamberto, human rights activist. Her life was dedicated to the memory of her sister Maravillas Lamberto, raped and assassinated by the Francoists
- Josefina Lopez, Chicana playwright
- Josefina Pla, Spanish poet, playwright, art critic, painter and journalist
- Josefina Ayerza, writer and a psychoanalyst
- Josefina Deland, Swedish feminist
- Josefina Wettergrund, Swedish writer
- Josefina Robledo Gallego, Spanish classical guitarist
- Josefina Tallado, Filipino politician

== Fiction ==
- Josefina LaCosta, a fictional character in the Richard Sharpe series of novels by Bernard Cornwell.
- Josefina, Gil Harris' fake girlfriend in the 2002 teen comedy The New Guy
- Josefina Menendez, a fictional character in the 2012 first-person shooter Call of Duty: Black Ops II.
- Josefina Montoya, the fictional main character of the American Girl Josefina stories
- Josefina Beltran, a fictional side character in the Argentinian soap opera Patito Feo

== Places ==
- Josefina, Zamboanga del Sur
- Josefina (Santa Fe), a commune in the Castellanos Department, Argentina.

== See also ==
- Josephina (disambiguation)
- Josephine (disambiguation)
