= Maravilha =

Maravilha (Portuguese for wonder) may refer to:

== Places ==
- Maravilha, Alagoas, municipality in Alagoas, Brazil
- Maravilha, Santa Catarina, municipality in Santa Catarina, Brazil
- Maravilhas, municipality in Minas Gerais, Brazil
- Maravilha Environmental Protection Area, municipal environmental protection area in Rio de Janeiro, Brazil

== People ==
- Maravilha (footballer) (born 1973), Marlisa Wahlbrink, Brazilian women's football goalkeeper
- Dadá Maravilha (born 1946), Dario José dos Santos, Brazilian football forward
- Elke Maravilha (1945-2016), German-Brazilian actress
- Fio Maravilha (born 1945), João Batista de Sales, Brazilian football forward
- Túlio Maravilha (born 1969), Túlio Humberto Pereira Costa, Brazilian football forward

== Other uses ==
- Feijão Maravilha, 1979 Brazilian telenovela
- Bonde das Maravilhas, Brazilian all-female funk group

== See also ==
- Maravilla (disambiguation)
