= Esteban Ezcurra Arraiza =

Spanish politician and commander (1888–1964)

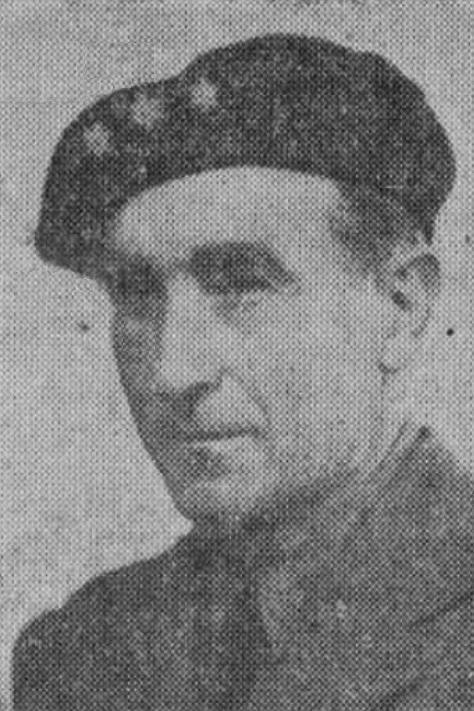
- Born: Esteban Ezcurra Arraiza; 1888; Echauri, Spain
- Died: 1964 (aged 75–76); Pamplona, Spain
- Occupation: landholder
- Known for: paramilitary
- Political party: Carlism

Esteban Ezcurra Arraiza (1888–1964) was a Spanish landholder and local public servant. During a few separate strings between 1920 and 1960 he served as mayor of Echauri and in the late 1940s as member of the Navarrese auxiliary advisory body, Consejo Foral Administrativo. In the mid-1930s he took part in Carlist conspiracy and preparations to the July 1936 coup d'état. He is best known as commander of the regional rearguard branch of the Carlist militia requeté, and was active in particular in early months of the Spanish Civil War. In historiography he is counted among chief architects of wartime Nationalist terror in Navarre and is portrayed as the person who managed the Carlist repression network in the region.

== Family and youth ==
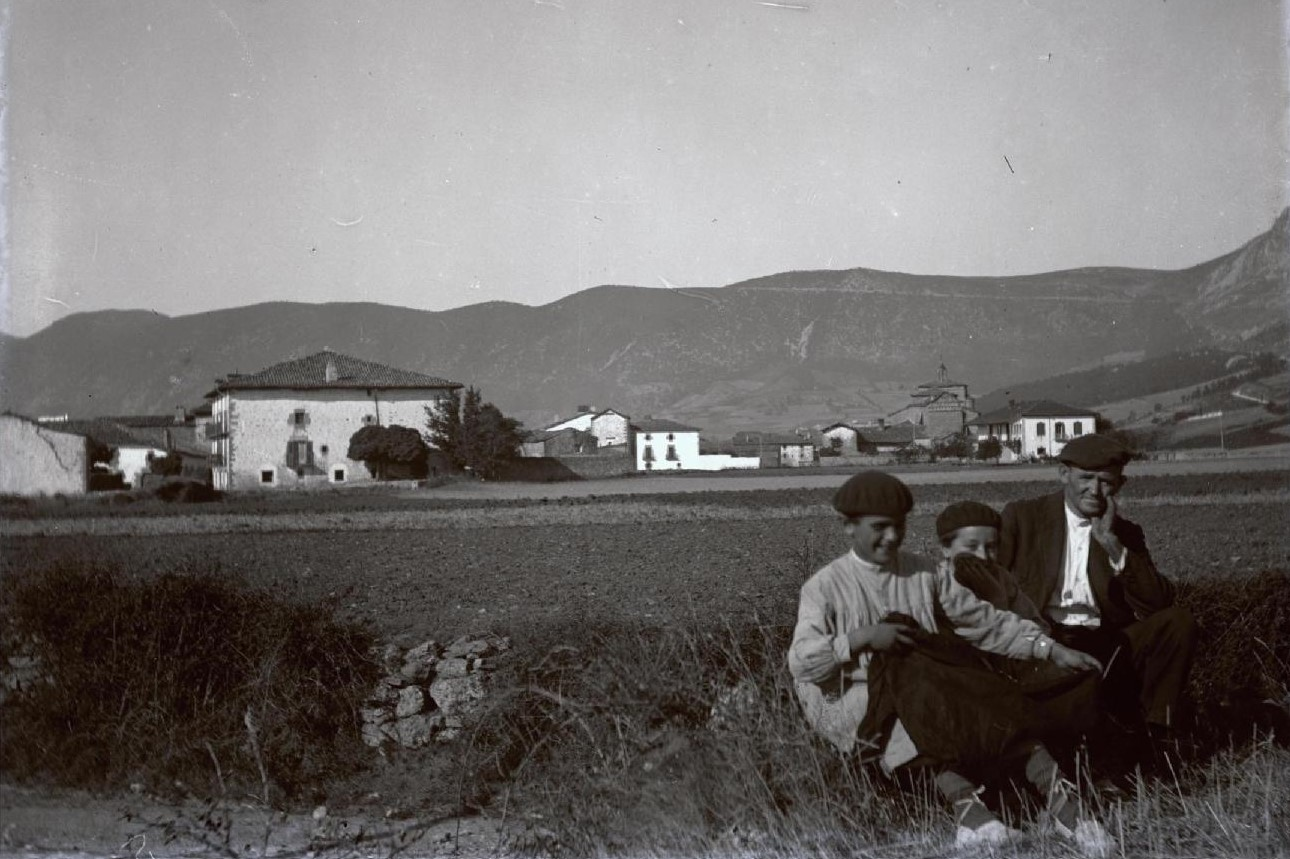
Echauri

The oldest records referring to Ezcurra's ancestors are related to Tafalla. In the 1750s the first representative of the family and the great-great-grandfather of Esteban was noted as born in a nearby town of Barásoain; it is there where the following 3 generations were born. They formed part of the local hidalguia; the family nest, Casa de Juanzar, was one of major buildings in the town. The paternal grandfather of Esteban, Pio Juan Manuel Ezcurra Jiménez (born 1807), married Josefa Francisca Felipe Erviti. Their son was the father of Esteban, José Ezcurra Felipe (died 1916). He was probably among the younger offspring, as he did not inherit the family possessions in Barásoain. Ezcurra Felipe married Teresa Arraiza López (1845–1910) from a family of somewhat higher social status, with representatives noted in history of the region. Since the late 17th century the Arraizas were related to Ochovi, where they owned a family palace. The maternal grandfather of Esteban, José Fermín Arraiza Illincheta (born 1807), a graduate in law, married a girl who descended from the Mendigañas, a landed family from Echauri. It was their daughter and Esteban's mother, an etxauritarra, who inherited the estate.

Following marriage José Ezcurra and Teresa Arraiza settled in the co-called Casa Mendigaña in Echauri; the family became “una de las casas fuerte del pueblo”. It is not clear how much land they owned. As a terrateniente Ezcurra was among largest taxpayers in the municipality and owned plots in neighboring locations; he ran the economy on ambitious scale and in the 1880s he presented his wines – though he was probably also growing cattle – on national fairs. In the 1890s he represented Echauri in talks on a would-be Logroño-Pamplona railway line and was among jurados in the Pamplona juridical district; in the early 20th century he became juez municipal. It is not clear how many children the couple had; sources point to 7 siblings, yet there is no further information on older brothers.

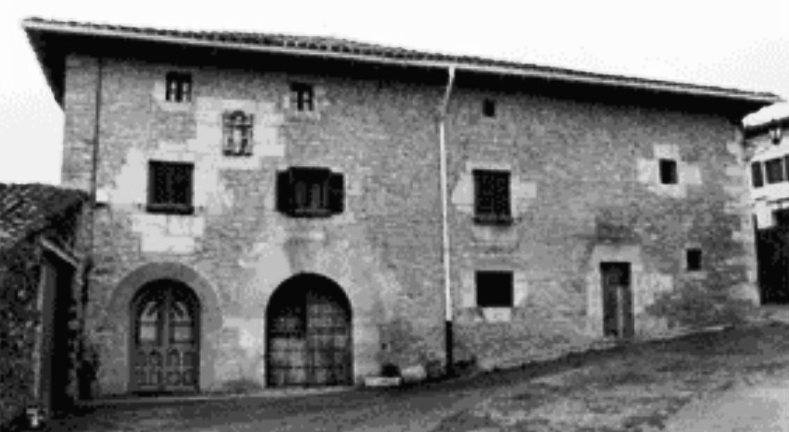
Casa Mendigaña, Echauri

There is close to nothing known about the childhood and youth of Esteban. None of the sources consulted provides information where he received secondary education and whether he pursued an academic career, e.g. in law as was typical for young males of his social standing. In 1906 as an 18-year-old he was first noted in the societé columns of the Pamplonese press. In the early 1910s he started to replace his father as contact person in commercial adverts, related to sale or rent of various agricultural equipment and assets; in 1915, already one year before death of his father, he was referred to as “el propietaro Esteban Ezcurra”. Though in 1924 he was mentioned in newspapers in relation to a “distinguida señorita”, he married as late as in 1930. He wed Julia Iñarra Legarraga (1893–1965) from Elizondo, descendant to a distinguished family and a relative to local Navarrese officials; the Iñarras and the Ezcurras might have been interrelated. The couple had no children.

== Early public engagements (until 1931) ==
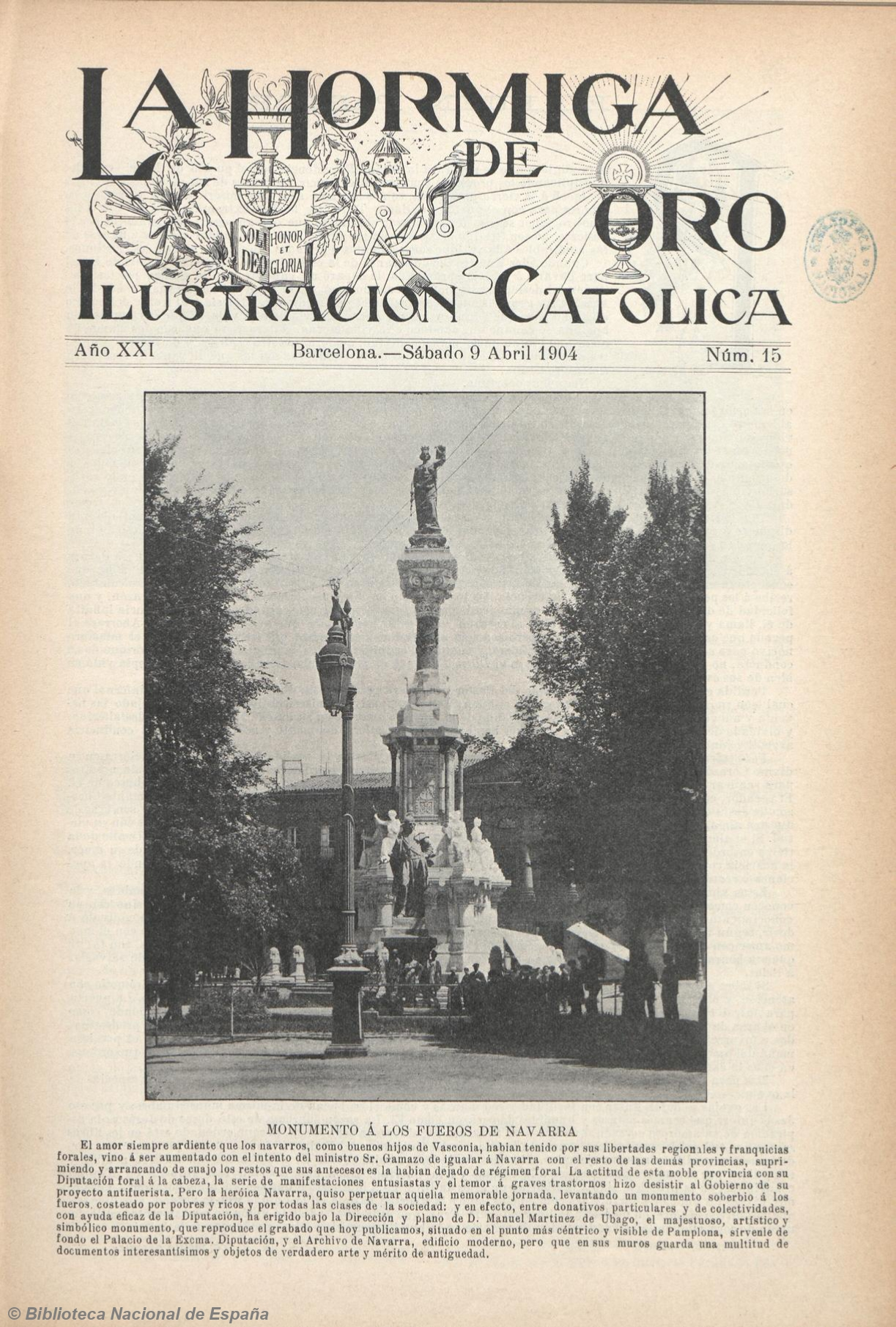
monument to fueros, Pamplona

Political preferences of the Ezcurra ancestors are not clear. The Arraizas have been traditionally supporting Carlism; Esteban's maternal uncle was related to the Juanmartiñenas, in 1874 awarded title of Conde de Aldaz by the claimant Carlos VII. However, there is no evidence of Esteban's Traditionalist endeavors until he reached mid-age. The first information on his public activity – apart from singing in the local Pamplonese choir - come from the mid-1910s, when in his late 20s he served as vicepresidente of Asociación Neutralista de Navarra, an organisation supporting Spanish neutrality in the Great War; in Spanish conditions it amounted to support of the Central Powers. In 1917 he was also recorded in regional Junta Directiva of Asociación de Labradores, an agricultural association dominated by large owners. In 1918, barely aged 30, Ezcurra represented Echauri at Asamblea de Ayuntamientos Navarros; it was a grand meeting of local mayors organized by Diputación Provincial as part of a campaign for so-called reintegración foral, restoration of fueros, abolished in the 19th century.

It is not clear whether during the Pamplonese 1918 Asamblea Ezcurra was already the mayor of Echauri; the first confirmed news of him holding the post comes from 1920 and in the press the information re-appears also during the following few years, at least until 1925. In the early 1920s he represented his town in numerous Navarrese initiatives related to reintegración and gained some prestige, e.g. in another Asamblea de Municipios he was among 6 alcaldes who represented the merindad of Pamplona. He joined Sociedad de Estudios Vascos, though it is not clear whether he spoke Basque; apart from membership, there is no trace of his activity in the organisation. His other cultural undertakings was engagement in local fiestas, where he used to perform as a singer, or the 1928 setup of Sociedad Unión Echauritarra, a sport organisation which he presided; its sections were dedicated to pelota, football and cycling.

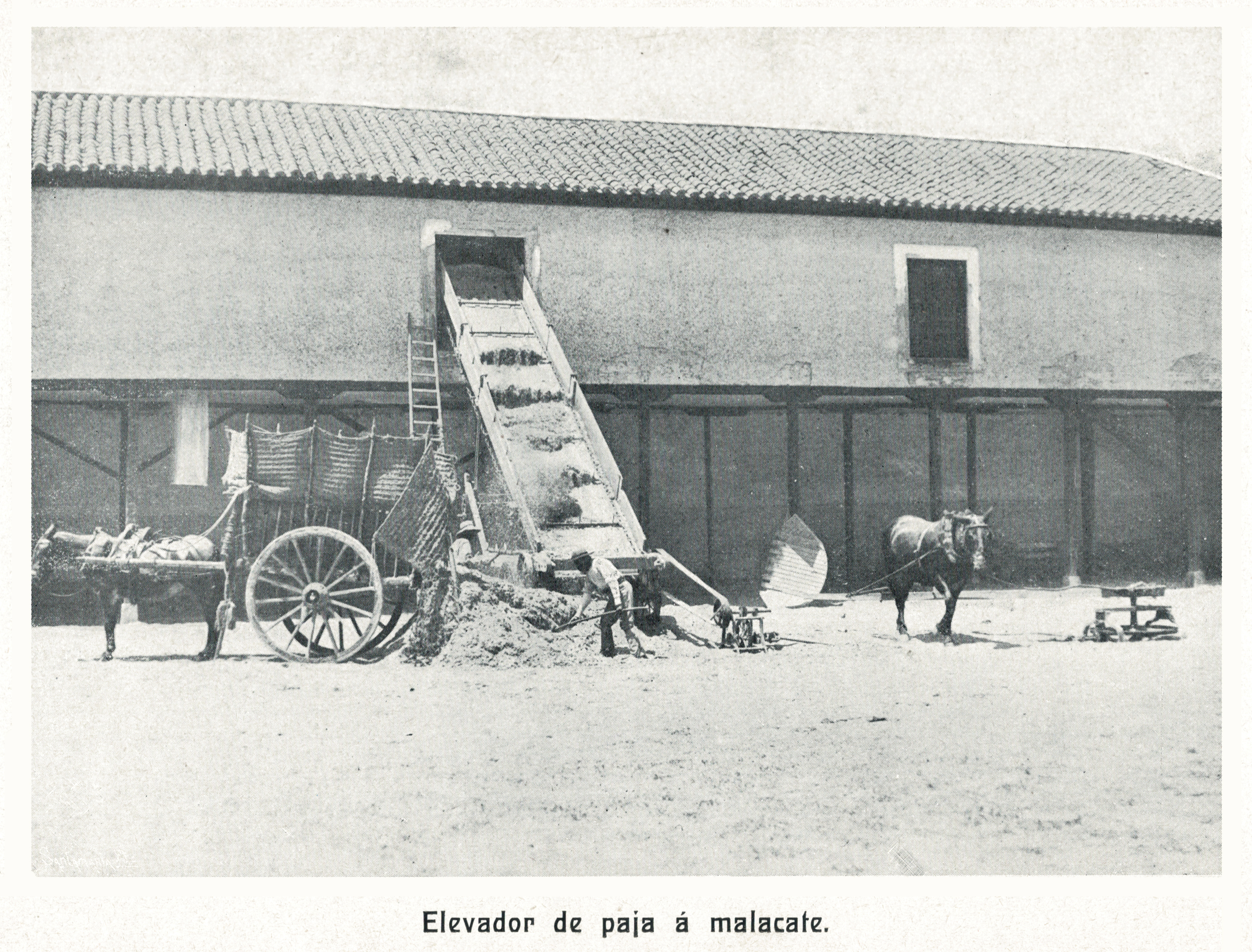
loading grain elevator, Spain

In the late 1920s Ezcurra was engaged in Sindicato Agrícola Católico, the organisation he started to preside in 1929. It formed part of Federación Católico-Social Navarra (FCSN), a regional agrarian organisation controlled mostly by mid-size and large landholders; in 1929 he emerged as secretary of the federation. Initially he presided over its Pamplona section, but in 1930 he assumed presidency of the entire organisation, the position held before by terratenientes like Esteban Deán, Francisco J. Martínez de Morentín and Justo Garrán. FCSN was a powerful regional economic organisation; in the early 1930s it grouped 99 Sindicatos Agrícolas or Cajas Rurales and had 13,291 members on its rolls, of which 53% were owners, 22% tenants and 25% rural workers. Being at the helm of FCSN elevated Ezcurra from a locally known activist to a person recognized in the regional Navarrese economic life, especially that he entered also other bodies, e.g. Comisión Arbitral de la Industria Azucarera. He followed in the footsteps of his father and also sent products to local fairs, at time gaining minor prizes.

== Second Republic (1931-1936) ==
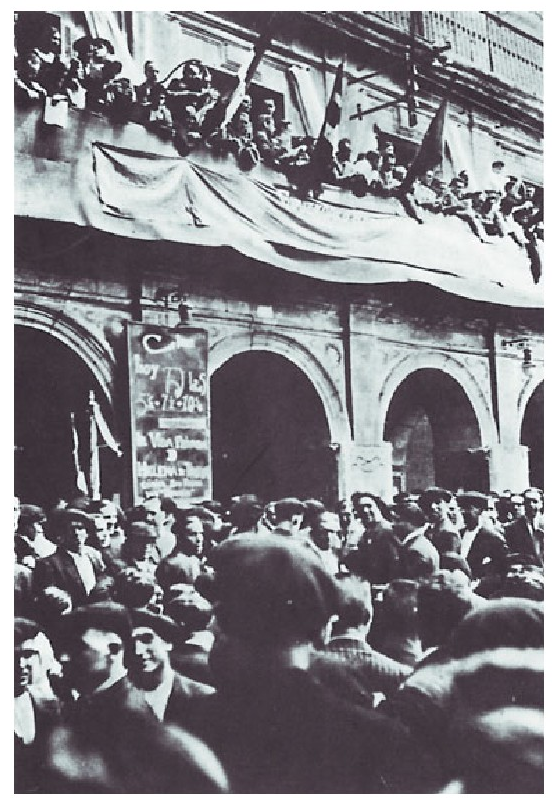
Estella statute rally, 1931

Earlier efforts aimed at reintegración foral following declaration of the republic in 1931 were re-directed towards a Basque-Navarrese autonomy. In May 1931 Ezcurra – again the mayor of Echauri – wired the assembly of municipios in Puente la Reina “most enthusiastic and sincere support” for the draft autonomy statute. In July as alcalde he participated in consultation process. In a grand meeting of Navarrese local councils in Estella he occupied a place in the presidency and voted in favor of the draft, supporting it also in Junta General of FCSN. The draft was eventually rejected by the Cortes, and in early 1932 another version was prepared by Madrid-appointed provincial self-governments. In June 1932 it was subject to approval by gathering of provincial ayuntamientos. This time Ezcurra voted against the statute; as most Navarrese alcaldes voted likewise, in the region the draft was rejected.

Republican reforms introduced arbitration bodies; in 1932 Ezcurra became member of Jurado Mixto del Trabajo Rural for the district of Pamplona, where he represented Sindicato Agrícola de Echauri. In this role he continued during the following years, voted as a candidate of FCSN and Asociación de Propietarios Terratenientes de Navarra (APTN). In public he voiced against reportedly subversive activity of UGT and its rural branch, and listed “formidable threats” the republican reforms posed to agriculture. It is known he acted as arbiter in various cases, but it is not clear to what extent he managed to implement his vision. As part of propaganda activity he gave addresses at meetings of anti-Marxist unions. As president of FCSN he worked to slow down implementation of agrarian reform in Navarre. Ezcurra resigned as FCSN president in 1934, taking positions in APTN and Caja de Seguros.

Carlist standard

Shortly prior to the fall of the monarchy, in March 1931, Ezcurra was mentioned as president of the Echauri Jaimista círculo. There was little follow-up noted until in 1933 he started to organize the Echauri detachment of requeté, possibly financing it with his own money. In 1935 he emerged as head of requeté in Valle de Echauri. In 1936, when gear-up to Carlist rising was in full swing, Ezcurra was nominated commander of one of 3 existent Navarrese requeté companies; he was given a provisional rank of alférez. A present-day historian suspects he kept a low profile as he was not subject to official measures, and this is despite almost open military drills, like machine-gun training for 30 men on the fields of Echauri in March 1936. In mid-June he took part in secret talks with leader of the military conspiracy, Mola. On July 2 it was in his house that Mola spoke with the nationwide requeté supervisor, Zamanillo. Though talks between the military and Carlist leadership were going on badly, in private Ezcurra told Mola he was prepared to join “con boina o sin boina”; he declared also that “si no convencemos mañana al general saco las bombas yo solo”.

== Inspectór de Requeté (1936-1937) ==
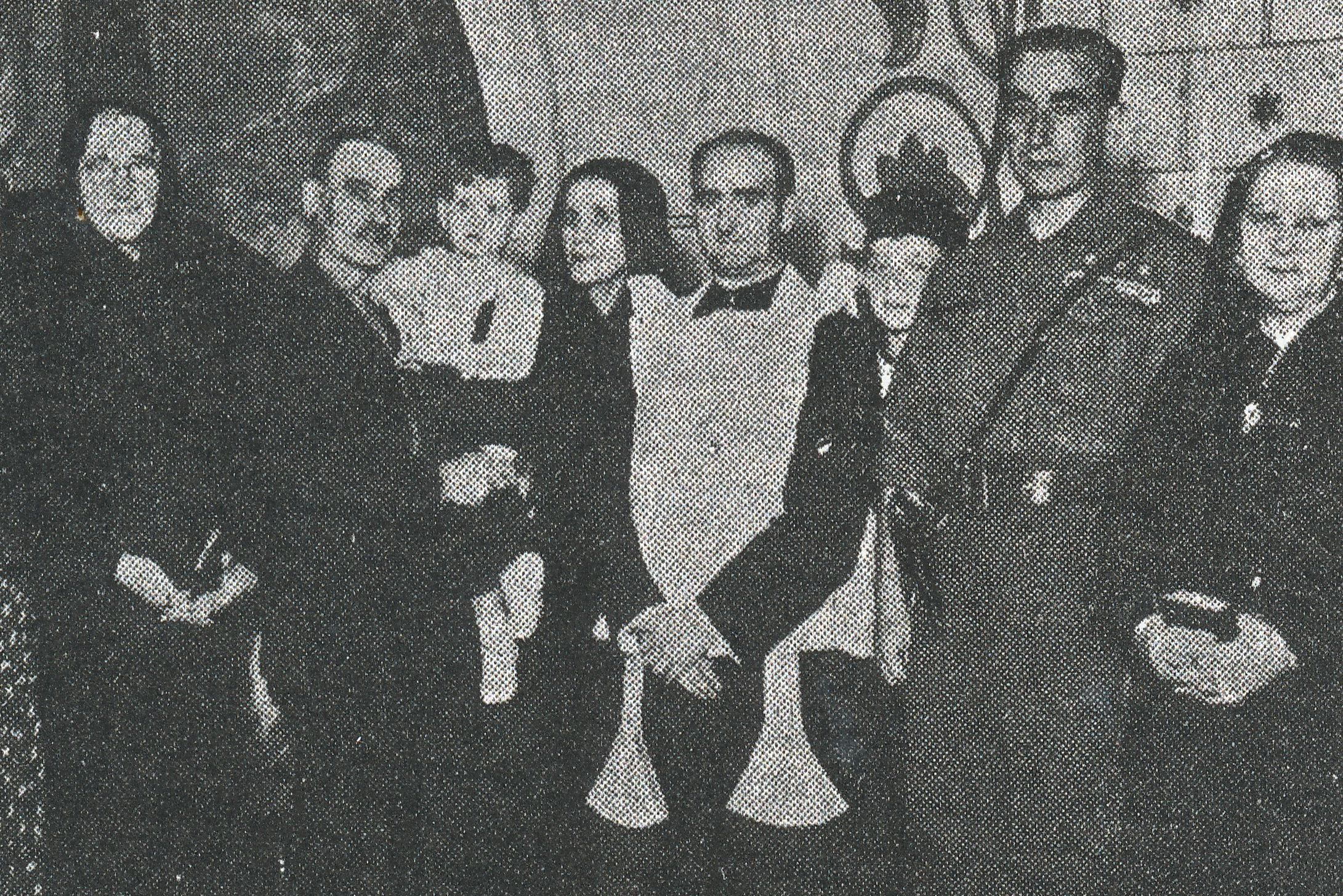
Ezcurra (2fR), September 1936

In mid-July 1936 Ezcurra was instrumental in transmitting orders to rise. Though he was among only 4 capitanes and tenientes of Navarrese requeté, scholars suspect his command during first days of the coup was rather nominal; sources provide evidence of his minor role in Valle de Echauri. He was not assigned to lead any militia unit dispatched from Navarre to Basque, Aragon or Guadarrama fronts. As leaders of Navarrese requeté were either detained or sent to lead combat troops, in August Junta Central Carlista de Guerra de Navarra (JCCGN) nominated Ezcurra Inspectór de Requeté de Navarra, effectively in command of Carlist militia units which remained in Navarre. His role included recruitment, assignments, directing reinforcements, propaganda, visits to frontlines, and co-ordination with army command. He also took part in non-military projects, e.g. the one about setting up a university in Pamplona.

One scholar systematically claims that Ezcurra was the person managing the Carlist repression in Navarre; he implies that Ezcurra was among key Nationalist officials responsible for some 3,000 killed in the province, according to some parameters the highest provincial repression rate across all Spain. General Mola, considered the chief architect of Nationalist terror, reportedly found in the likes of Ezcurra perfect “instrumentos” to implement his strategy. The claim is chiefly based on Ezcurra's role of commander of all rearguard requeté troops (at times referred to as Requeté Auxiliar, different from frontline requeté tercios) operational in Navarre. Three of his specific roles are listed in particular. First, it is understood that he was either in some way responsible or that he was personally running the Carlist detention centre, located in the Pamplona Piarist college. Second, he is supposed to have been the key person issuing incarceration or excarceration orders, to be acted upon by the Carlist repressive machinery. Third, he is held responsible for – in some versions personally commanding – so-called Tercio Móvil or Tercio Auxiliar, a requeté unit which performed arrests and executions.

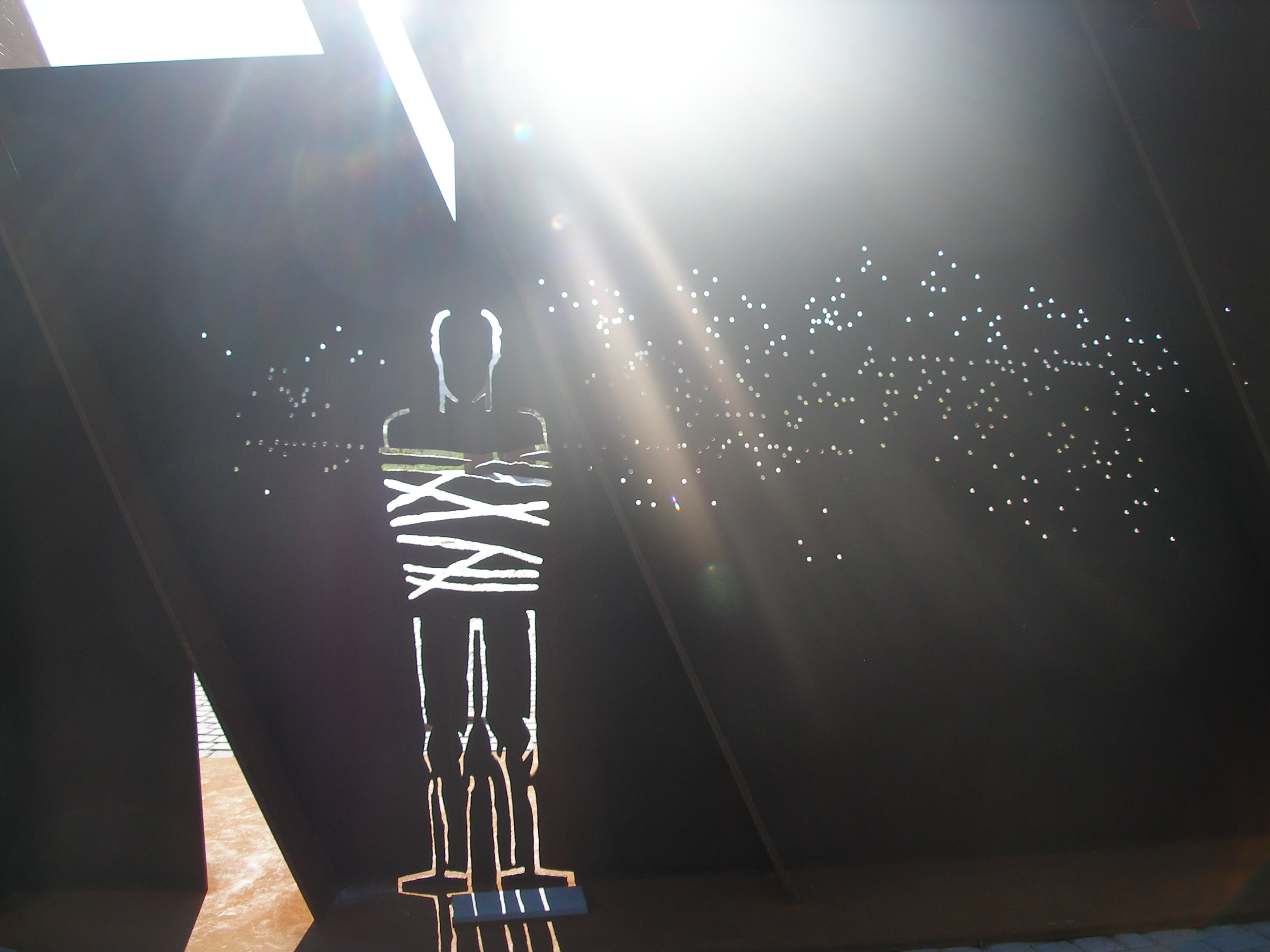
Memory Park, Sartaguda

None of the sources consulted claims that Ezcurra was personally killing inmates or commanding executions. Though in general terms he is considered a key person responsible for Carlist repression in Navarre, it is not clear whether and if yes how he was related to two most notorious cases involving requetés, i.e. so-called matanza de Monreal (October 1936, 64 killed) and matanza de Valcaldera (August 1936, 52 killed). It is not certain whether the Valcaldera killings occurred when Ezcurra was in command; the massacre in Monreal took place when he was away. One historian does not associate him with the crime and puts the blame on Jaime del Burgo; at the time Ezcurra was on sort of a propaganda journey to the Nationalist-held Andalusia and was noted back in Navarre in December. According to some accounts Ezcurra protected inhabitants of his native Echauri and prevented any would-be Nationalist repressions in the town. Officially Ezcurra's role as head of Navarrese requeté was terminated following the political unification of April 1937.

== Unification and afterwards (1937-1939) ==
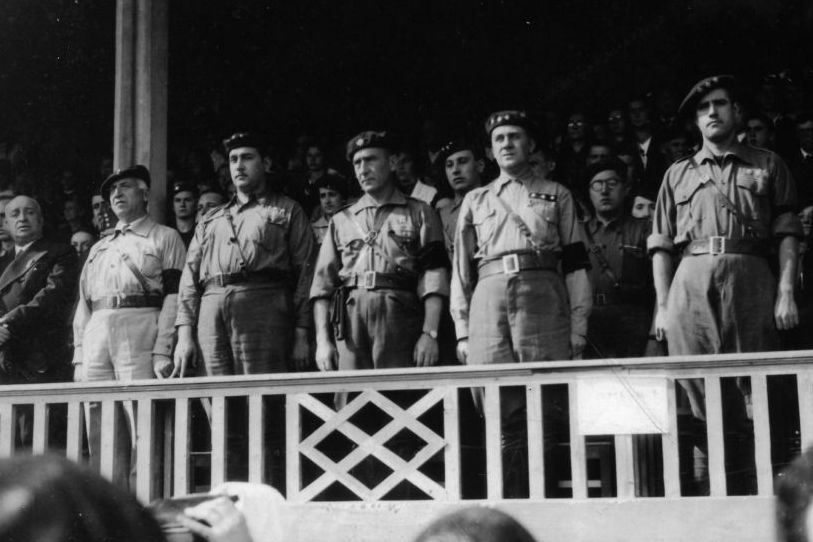
Ezcurra (3fR) among Nationalist officials

Ezcurra mattered little in nationwide politics of Comunión Tradicionalista, though he carried some weight in Navarre. When in early 1937 the party got wind of unification designs, initially Ezcurra was not involved in decision-making, e.g. he was absent during the meeting of CT executive in Insua in February 1937. However, during a meeting in Burgos in March he assisted with a Navarrese requeté detachment waiting outside, which by some participants was perceived as intimidation; Ezcurra was considered “en la órbita del conde de Rodezno”, in political entourage of the chief pro-unification advocate, Rodezno. During the sitting of JCCGN in Pamplona in early April he was invited as a requeté representative. It was decided to form a delegation and press the unification cause with the regent-claimant, Don Javier; Ezcurra was selected to be among the envoys. Few days later in Saint-Jean-de-Luz he declared to the regent that requetés were willing to build “New Spain”; the hesitant Don Javier grudgingly consented. In mid-April Ezcurra took part in another key JCCGN political meeting, which authorized Rodezno to carry out the unification talks.

Once the Unification Decree was published Ezcurra wired his enthusiastic support to Franco. In late spring the Carlist and the Falangist paramilitary organisations were declared formally united in a new service, dubbed National Militia, even though frontline units retained their identity. This formally terminated Ezcurra's service as Inspector de Requeté. However, in June 1937 the military headquarters nominated him “capitán honorario” and provisional head of Milicias Nacionales in Navarre. At this role he replaced a career officer Pedro Ibisate Gorria, who assumed command of a frontline unit. During the summer Ezcurra remained supportive of unification proceedings. In August he took part in another sitting of now formally defunct JCCGN; Rodezno briefed the gathering on developments in the new state party, Falange Española Tradicionalista, and received the authorization to proceed. Ezcurra was nominated to comisión, supposed to handle unification-related tension with Don Javier, though there is nothing known about his activity at this role.

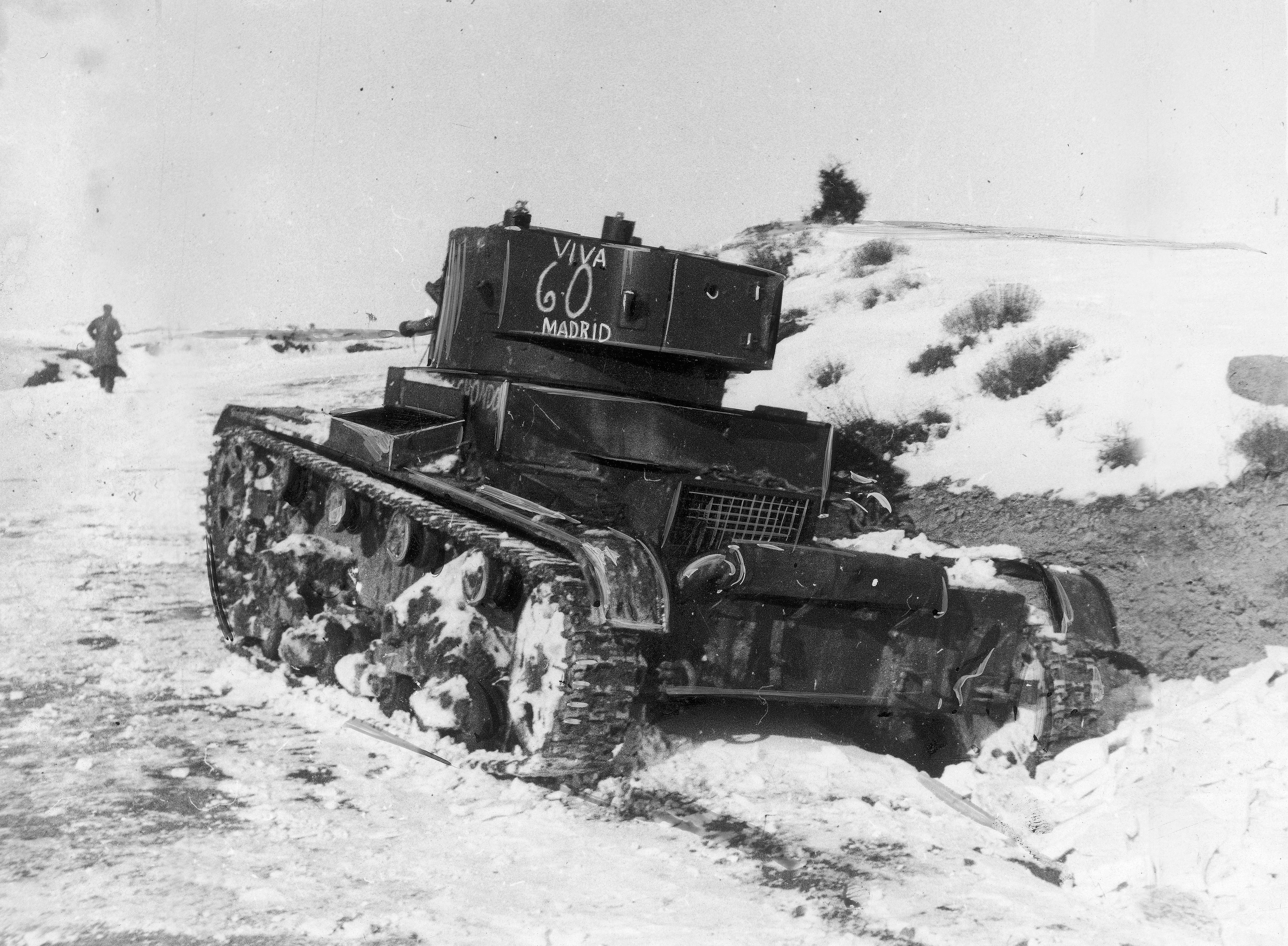
battle of Teruel

In late 1937 he kept appearing in the press as Jefé Provincial de la Milicia Nacional, though mostly as engaged in procedural and propaganda roles. Things took a turn in February 1938, when requetés were heavily engaged on the Teruel front. Ezcurra protested to the military against combat deployment of Carlist troops. In his opinion, they were unfairly selected as the only ones which formed shock units, to be thrown upon the Republican lines, with heavy casualties anticipated. In response, Ezcurra was dismissed as head of Navarrese Milicias Nacionales. The Nationalist press maintained total blackout about the incident; the Republican one reported it, at times accompanied by conclusion that the Franco-enforced unification has failed and the requetes were referring to the Falangists as "Rojos". One newspaper claimed that Ezcurra was detained. Though in March 1938 he was still occasionally mentioned as “Jefe de Requetés” in local titles, afterwards he disappeared from the press and there is no information on his public activity until the end of the war.

== Early Francoism (after 1939) ==
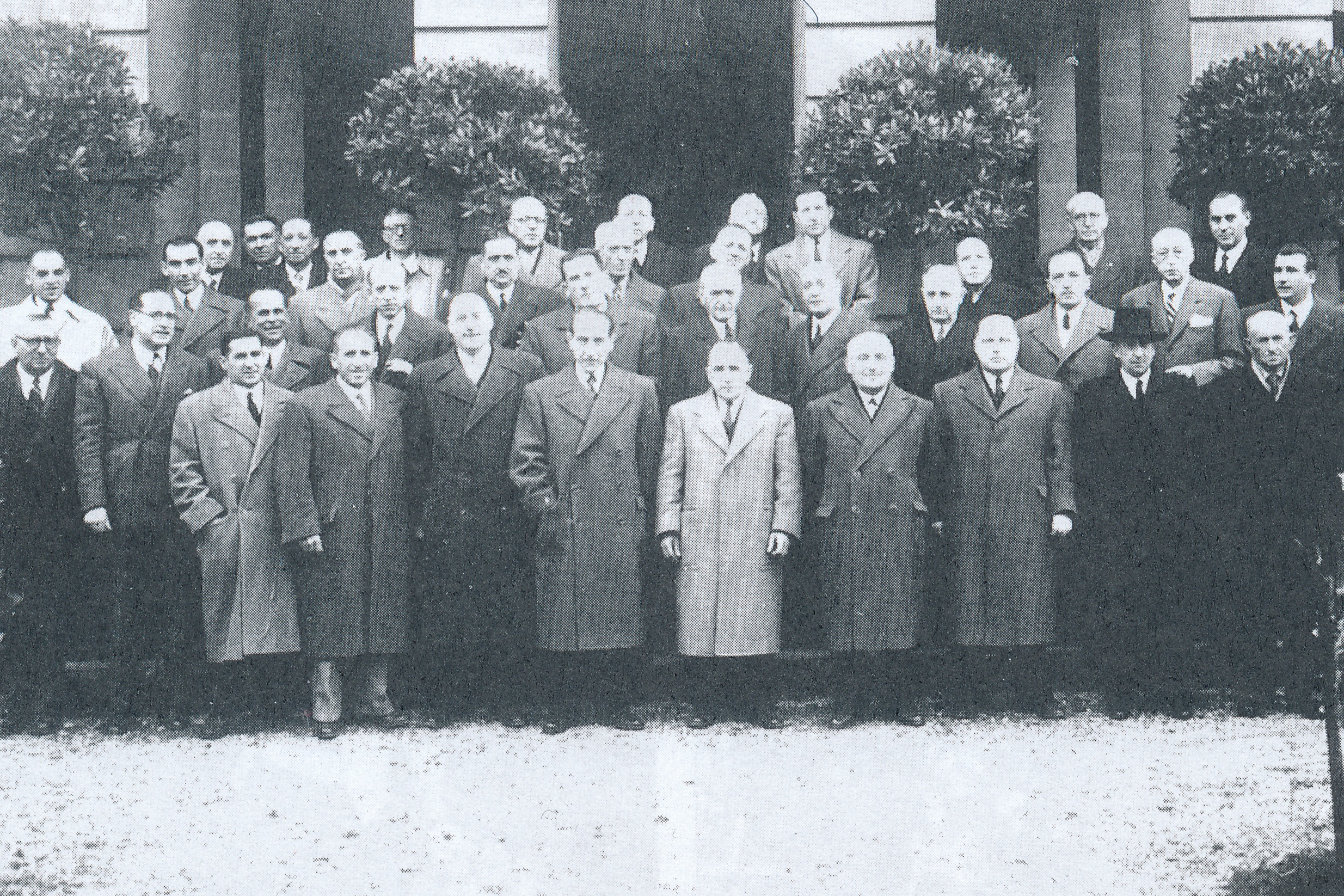
Ezcurra in Consejo Foral Administrativo de Navarra, 1949

An internal Carlist document from 1940 lists Ezcurra as leader of old requeté jefatura “deprived of any prestige”, one of 3 factions competing for influence within the bewildered organisation. The same year he co-signed a letter, addressed to the nationwide CT leader Manuel Fal Conde; it contained personal suggestions for the re-established Junta Regional. In 1941, following outbreak of the German-Soviet war, he co-signed a manifesto which pledged loyalty to CT authorities; its bottom line was discouraging former requetés from volunteering to División Azul. In 1942 he maintained this stand against a competitive requeté faction. In 1943 a Carlist from La Rioja, Joaquín Purón, was nominated by Fal as a new Inspector de Requetés de Navarra, entrusted with re-organizing the branch. Former leaders like Ezcurra and Lizarza were somewhat upset, but eventually they decided to co-operate and structure the militia along pre-war lines. Later that year with Purón and Francisco Armisén he formed part of a 3-man comisión permanente, entrusted with political tasks: it was to supervise nominations from merindades to the re-structured Junta Regional.

Since the early 1930s there was a current within Carlism which claimed that after death of the octogenarian pretender Alfonso Carlos, the dynastic leadership should be assumed by his grandnephew, Karl Pius. Until the mid-1940s Ezcurra was not known as related. In 1943 Karl Pius, posing as Carlos VIII, openly declared his claim, and Ezcurra occasionally took part in meetings flavored by so-called Carloctavismo. In 1945 Carlos nominated 10 members of his Real Consejo del Reino de Navarra; Ezcurra was among them. Technically supporting Karl Pius did not violate the Carlist loyalty, as under the regency of Don Javier various groups were free to advocate their preferred candidates to the crown. However, the Carloctavistas were pushing the limits; in 1946 many of them – Ezcurra included – signed an open letter to Don Javier; in correct but bold terms they demanded that the regent nominates a successor to the late Don Alfonso Carlos. This is the second last known Ezcurra's epizode related to Traditionalism; the last one was his 1951 support for Carlist candidature to the Pamplona ayuntamiento from so-called tercio familiar; some scholars consider it a proof that he sided with “el sector más franquista del tradicionalismo”.

Ezcurra's name kept appearing in proceedings of executive of FCSN, now renamed to Federación Agro-Social de Navarra, but following incorporation of the organisation into the Francoist vertical sindicates in the early 1940s he was no longer listed. At least during the period of 1944-1946 he again served as alcalde of Echauri; in 1949 he was nominated to Consejo Foral Administrativo, the body he unsuccessfully aspired to in 1935. Between 1952 and 1960 he was again almost every year noted as the mayor of his town. He remained moderately active also in some non-political agricultural organisations, like Unión Territorial de Cooperativas. His death was barely recorded in local press, except for private necrological notes; few days later the Carlist El Pensamiento Navarro published a small related editorial piece which recollected the defunct.

== See also ==
- Carlism
- Traditionalism (Spain)
- Victims of Civil War in Navarre
- Carlist war crimes
