= James D. Bearden III =

American oncologist

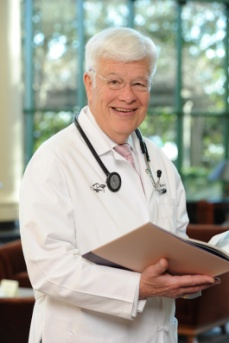
James D. Bearden

James D. Bearden III, M.D. F.A.C.P. (born 1943) is a native of South Carolina, a medical oncologist and current Vice President and Clinical Research & Physician Manager of the Gibbs Cancer Center & Research Institute in Spartanburg, South Carolina.

== Background ==
James Bearden III was born in Newberry, South Carolina and received his undergraduate degree from The Citadel. He earned a medical degree from the Medical University of South Carolina.

== Military career ==
He completed 11 years of Active Duty with the U.S. Air Force Medical Corps and 10 years of reserve duty with the U.S. Navy Medical Corps, while in private practice, retiring as a Naval Captain., After years of advanced training and teaching at some of the military medical facilities, he retired from active duty and came to Spartanburg to begin private practice.

== Post-Military Career ==
He founded Palmetto Hematology Oncology in 1976 (currently Medical Group of the Carolinas) and, in association with his friend and colleague, Dr. Julian Josey, proposed the formation of a cancer center at Spartanburg Regional Healthcare System in 1976 that would be dedicated to the diagnosis and treatment of cancer. This eventually led to the establishment of Gibbs Cancer Center & Research Institute in 1999. He served as principal investigator of the Upstate Carolina Community Clinical Oncology Program (CCOP) since 1987 and was the co-principal investigator from 1983 to 1987, bringing clinical trials for cancer prevention and treatment to over 1300 patients. In addition, Bearden has served as the principal investigator of the National Cancer Institute Community Cancer Center Program (NCCCP) since 2006. The CCOP and NCCCP programs ended in 2014, paving the way for a new NCI Program called "NCI Clinical Oncology Research Program" (NCORP). On January 8, 2014, Bearden joined forces with James (Jim) Atkins, MD of Goldsboro, North Carolina, to apply for one of the first NCORP Grants. This collaboration brought together the Southeast Cancer Control Consortium CCOP (SCCC CCOP) and the Upstate Carolina CCOP (UC-CCOP). They were awarded one of 34 Community Site grants.

In addition to serving on numerous boards and councils, Bearden has received the American Society of Clinical Oncology Award for Research on Cancer in Community and Academic Settings, one of only 10 recipients annually. The founding donors of The Bearden-Josey Center for Breast Health named the facility in Bearden's honor in recognition of his vision and expertise. The Bearden-Josey Clinic for Breast Health opened in 2008. Bearden was awarded the Order of the Palmetto, the highest civilian honor granted by the state of South Carolina, in 2012, in recognition of his role as a national leader in the fight against cancer.
