= Maravillas =

Maravillas literally means "wonders", "marvels" in Spanish. It may refer to:

- Maravillas, a ward (barrio) of Madrid
- Maravillas (film), a 1981 Spanish film
- Maravillas (Mexibús), a BRT station in Nezahualcóyotl, Mexico
- Town Maravillas, or Wondertown, a fictional Cuban town from the 1991 Cuban film Alice in Wondertown
- María de las Maravillas de Jesús, (1891–1974) Spanish Carmelite, saint
- Patio Maravillas, an artivist squat in Madrid
- Maravillas Lamberto, a victim of White Terror during the Spanish Civil War
- Maravillas Rojo, Catalan politician
- Maravillas Creek, Texas
- Maravillas de Colombia S.A., Colombian manufacturer of fireworks

== See also ==
- Maravilla (disambiguation)
