= Jossy =

Jossy is a given name. Notable people with the name include:

- Jossy Dombraye, Nigerian footballer and manager
- Jossy Mansur (1934–2016), Aruban newspaper editor

== See also ==
- Josey
