= Mikkel Aaland =

Norwegian-American photographer

- Born: 1952 (age 73–74); San Francisco, California, U.S.
- Notable work: Sweat (1978 book)

Mikkel Aaland (born 1952) is a Norwegian-American photographer, based in San Francisco and Norway. He is known for work in the early days of digital photography, as well as his twelve books on photography. He is best known for his 1978 book Sweat, an illustrated history of sweat bathing, and for his 2024 seven-episode documentary series, Perfect Sweat, an exploration of bathing traditions around the world. His documentary photographs have been exhibited in major institutions around the world, including the Bibliothèque Nationale in Paris and the former Lenin Museum in Prague. Aaland is the author of works of memoir, books featuring his own photojournalism as well as works on digital imaging and various Adobe Photoshop products.

== Biography ==
=== Early years ===
Aaland was born in San Francisco and grew up in nearby Livermore, California. His Norwegian born father worked as a scientist at the Lawrence Livermore National Laboratory research facility. Aaland was an Eagle Scout who attended Livermore High School, where he played football. He graduated from California State University, Chico with a major in photojournalism and was an All-American swimmer on the NCAA Division II championship team.

=== Beginning career ===
In 1978, Aaland published his first book, Sweat: The Illustrated History and Description of the Finnish Sauna, Russian Bania, Islamic Hammam, Japanese Mushi-buro, Mexican Temescal, and American Indian & Eskimo Sweat Lodge. The book was the culmination of a three-year travel and photo-journalistic tour of the world's various bathing customs. Aaland continues to be an active proponent and historian of sweat bathing.

Aaland published his second nonfiction book, County Fair: Portraits (1981) after spending nine years traveling the United States visiting county fairs. Jon Carroll wrote in New West magazine, "(County Fair) is a chronicle of people being who they are. These faces become historical." The photographer Mary Ellen Mark said of the book: "Such moving photographs, funny and sad. It's real Americana. Aaland is a latter day Mike Disfarmer." In 1982, Aaland appeared as a guest on the David Letterman Show, sharing work from both Sweat and County Fair.

During an interview in 1981, Aaland was introduced to the newly emerging field of digital photography by renowned photographer Ansel Adams. He contributed articles and photos for other publications such as American Photographer, FOTO, American Photo, Digital Creativity, Newsweek, The Washington Post, Popular Science, and Wired. In 1981, he received the National Art Director's award for photography.

=== Digital photography instruction ===
Aaland was one of the first to write about digital photography. In the 1980s he wrote covered the topic in a regular column on the topic for American Photographer, and as West Coast editor of Swedish magazine FOTO. In 1992, Aaland released the book Digital Photography. The book gives instruction and tips on using digital cameras to take unique photographs. He followed that with Still Images in Multimedia (1996) and then Shooting Digital: Pro Tips for Taking Great Pictures with Your Digital Camera (2003), which was named by Designer's Bookshelf as "Best Digital Photography Book of the Year for 2004."

Aaland was the co-host of the Nordic Light International Festival of Photography between 2011 and 2018.

Beginning in 2001, Aaland began publishing a number of guidebooks about using the computer design program Photoshop to enhance digital photography; Photoshop Elements Solutions: The Art of Digital Photography was followed by second, third, and fourth volumes. He also acted as an unpaid adviser to the development of both the alpha, beta, and final versions of the Adobe Photoshop Elements application. Photoshop CS2 RAW: Using Adobe Camera Raw, Bridge, and Photoshop to Get the Most Out of Your Digital Camera (2006) was Aaland's first of two books explaining the graphic file format RAW, which is used by professional photographers.

While working as an adviser on beta tests for Adobe Lightroom, Aaland proposed a real-world test of the software by inviting professional photographers to travel to a far-off land where they would use Lightroom. The result of this was Photoshop Lightroom Adventure: Mastering Adobe's Next-generation Tool for Digital Photographers (2007), which brought professional photographers to Iceland to test the software. Aaland followed up that book the same year with Photoshop Lightroom 2 Adventure: Mastering Adobe's Next-generation Tool for Digital Photographers, which brought professional photographers to Tasmania to show users how photographers work with the Lightroom 2 software.

=== Memoir and travel work ===
In a diversion from photography instruction, Aaland published The Sword of Heaven: A Five Continent Odyssey to Save the World (1999), detailing the six years he spent traveling around the world documenting a peace project initiated by survivors of Hiroshima and led by a Shinto priest. During this time, Aaland dropped brick-sized pieces of a holy Shinto Sword of Heaven into bodies of water around the world to form a protective ring of kami.

Aaland's most recent book, The River in My Backyard, is an illustrated memoir exploring his family history, the murder of his father, and his pilgrimage to Mount Kailash.

In 1984, Wired sent Aaland to Paris to interview filmmaker Chris Marker. The interview was later published as the cover story of Digital Creativity. Following the interview, the two became friends and correspondents. Aaland is currently working on a project that will honor Marker.

=== Sweat bathing ===
Aaland, as the author of Sweat: The Illustrated History and Description of the Finnish Sauna, Russian Bania, Islamic Hammam, Japanese Mushi-buro, Mexican Temescal, and American Indian & Eskimo Sweat Lodge, is recognized as an authority for sweat bathing. In 2014, Aaland organized the Perfect Sweat Summit in San Francisco, bringing together 50 international experts on sweat bathing.

Aaland is co-host of the travel documentary series, Perfect Sweat, which combines his career-long interests in photography, travel, and sweat bathing. The seven-episode documentary series is an exploration of bathing traditions around the world and revisits the topic of his 1978 book Sweat.

He is also an honorary member of the International Sauna Association (ISA) and the British Sauna Society and a co-founder and board member of the Norwegian Sauna Association (Badstulaug).

=== Philanthropy ===
As the president of the International Sauna Aid Foundation, Aaland helped bring mobile saunas to Ukraine, aiding communities affected by war. He also set up saunas for first responders during the January 2025 Southern California wildfires.

== Bibliography ==
- Sweat: The Illustrated History and Description of the Finnish Sauna, Russian Bania, Islamic Hammam, Japanese Mushi-buro, Mexican Temescal, and American Indian & Eskimo Sweat Lodge, Capra Press: Santa Barbara, 1978; reprinted, Borgo Press: San Bernardino, 1989; reprinted as ebook, Cyberbohemia Press: San Francisco, 2017. ISBN 0-88496-124-9
- County Fair: Portraits, Capra Press: Santa Barbara, 1981. ISBN 0-88496-172-9
- The Sword of Heaven: A Five Continent Odyssey to Save the World, Traveler's Tales: San Francisco, 1999. ISBN 1-885211-44-9
- Pilgrimage to Kailash: Tibet's Holy Mountain, Cyberbohemia Press: San Francisco, 2013.
- The River in My Backyard, Cyberbohemia Press: San Francisco, 2016. ISBN 978-0-9972610-1-1

=== Photography instruction ===
- Digital Photography (with Rudolph Burger), Random House: New York, 1992. ASIN B000KVE4BA
- Still Images in Multimedia, Hayden Books: Indianapolis, 1996. ISBN 1-56830-273-8
- Photoshop for the Web, O'Reilly Media: Cambridge, MA, 1998; 2nd edition, 1999. ISBN 1-56592-641-2
- Photoshop Elements Solutions: The Art of Digital Photography, Sybex: San Francisco, 2001; 2nd edition, 2002; 3rd edition, 2005; Wiley: Indianapolis, 2005. ISBN 0-7821-4446-2
- Shooting Digital: Pro Tips for Taking Great Pictures with Your Digital Camera, Sybex: San Francisco, 2003; Sybex/Wiley: Indianapolis, 2007. ISBN 0-470-04287-7
- Photoshop CS2 RAW: Using Adobe Camera Raw, Bridge, and Photoshop to Get the Most Out of Your Digital Camera, O'Reilly Media: Sebastopol, 2006; reprinted as Photoshop CS3 RAW: Transform Your RAW Images into Works of Art, O'Reilly Media: Sebastopol CA, 2008. ISBN 0-596-00851-1
- Photoshop Lightroom Adventure: Mastering Adobe's Next-generation Tool for Digital Photographers, O'Reilly Media: Sebastopol, 2007; 2nd edition, 2007. ISBN 0-596-10099-X

== Related reading ==
- Zwingle, Erlan. American Photographer, December 1, 1982.
- California Bookwatch, April 1, 2006.
- Ibid., May 1, 2008.
- Ibid., November 1, 2008.
- Internet Bookwatch, March 1, 2009.
- Lombardo, Daniel. Library Journal, March 15, 2007.
- M2 Presswire, "Helping Digital Photographers Go RAW; O'Reilly Releases Photoshop CS2 RAW," April 18, 2006.
- bid., "Photoshop CS3 RAW - New from O'Reilly Media Transform Your RAW Images into Works of Art," January 28, 2008.
- Ibid., "Photoshop Lightroom 2 Adventure - New from O'Reilly: Instruction with Inspiration," November 10, 2008.
- Petersen's Photographic, March 1, 2005.
- Lafortune, Wes. Photo Life, May 1, 2009.
- McNamara, Michael J. Popular Photography, September 1, 1993.
- Eggers, Ron. Professional Photographer, October 13, 2008.
- Ashbrook, Stanley B. PSA Journal, June 1, 2006.
- Ibid., October 1, 2006.
- Ibid., March 1, 2007
- Ibid., January 1, 2008.
- Ibid., March 1, 2008.
- Ibid., January 1, 2009.
- Reference & Research Book News, February 1, 2000.
- SciTech Book News, March 1, 2001.
- Ibid., June 1, 2006.
- Ibid., December 1, 2007.
- Ibid., September 1, 2008.
- Ibid., December 1, 2008.
