= The Silver Cloud Café =

1996 novel by Alfredo Véa Jr.

- Painting by artist John H Howard
- Author: Alfredo Véa Jr.
- Language: English
- Publisher: Dutton
- Publication date: 1996
- Publication place: America
- Media type: Print
- Pages: 176 leaves, 352 pages
- ISBN: 0-525-94077-4
- OCLC: 34245271
- Dewey Decimal: 813/.54 20
- LC Class: PS3572.E2 S55 1996
- Preceded by: La Maravilla
- Followed by: Gods Go Begging

The Silver Cloud Café (1996) is the second novel by Alfredo Véa Jr. Set primarily in modern-day San Francisco, The Silver Cloud Café has the narrative frame of a mystery, but utilizes postmodern devices, manipulating time and space. It begins simply enough, at the scene of a hideous crime in the Mission District in 1993 San Francisco, but the story quickly spins out into various levels, calling attention to political-working-class themes and racial boundaries by exploring the depths of its diverse cast of characters.

== Plot summary ==
At the scene of a crime in 1993 San Francisco, the victim, Bambino Reyes, has been brutally slashed open and the wound cauterized. Strangely, the "murder" seems connected to two fires nearly half a mile away. And even more confusing, the drawbridge operator and sole witness, Miguel Govea, claims that the murder was actually a consecration.

As in his first novel, La Maravilla, Silver Cloud includes a semi-autobiographical character named Zeferino Del Campo. Zeferino is a defense lawyer in San Francisco, who has been specially requested to represent the man charged with the bizarre, ritualistic "murder." Upon meeting the accused and hearing his childhood name, Zefe, Zeferino recalls his past with immigrant farmworkers, a process that continues throughout the novel.

The accused is Teodoro Cabiri, "lover of God, and of ship-wrecked men". "Ted For Short" is a hunchbacked, Filipino midget with tremendous charisma and amazing sleight of hand. During their first meeting, Ted instructs Zefe to visit a bar in the District that he will find "irresistible". The bar is Raphael's Silver Cloud Café, the sign of which captivates Zeferino.

As Zeferino recalls his past, he realizes the connections between it and the present "murder" investigation. While at "French Camp," an asparagus farm near Stockton, California, Faustino, Ted For Short, and Zeferino are assaulted, and Pietro Ditto, one of the "big bosses", is killed. Faustino and Ted must part ways, knowing that it may be years before they will be able to see one another again. On their way to Camp Corregidor, Ted prays for Zefe to forget all that he's seen this night that he will not have to be haunted by the memories of murder and hate.

The narrative turns to Bambino, the illegitimate son of Pietro Ditto, as he arrives in San Francisco - bitter, hateful, and seeking retribution. Bambino has been on the trail of Ted For Short and Faustino all these years, but now, they have given up running, and Bambino has closed in.

Meanwhile, Humberto, a crazed and ancient Mexican priest who lives atop the Silver Cloud in a silver tower, devises a plan to stop Bambino. King Pete, Anatoly, Miguel, and others take part in the climactic scene as Bambino and Ted face off in a final confrontation.

== Characters ==
=== In order of appearance ===
Miguel Govea – A passive Purépecha from Mexico. Govea operates the drawbridge and was an eyewitness to the “murder” of Reyes. A former Federale in Mexico, Govea was also one of the soldiers in the firing squad for Humberto and his brother.

Stuart ______ - a Jewish private investigator and loyal friend of Zeferino. His last name changes according to the situation, and he drives the Kosher Cruiser, a surveillance van fully equipped with its own ecosystem.

Zeferino Del Campo – a.k.a. Zefe or Zef – The protagonist and lawyer of Teodoro. Teodoro once protected Zefé when he was young, and now Zef must protect Ted as his lawyer.

Beatrice the changeling – A Tongan woman who has undergone transsexual surgery. She is the bouncer at the Café.

Humberto Augustine Pro – A priest whose life was extended when he and his brother were put in front of a firing squad. Humberto has since tried to find a way to kill himself. He hears the voices of the angels from the sign on the café, and he directs the events on the evening of the “consecration” (a.k.a. Reyes’ death).

Queenie – Although married to King, Queenie spends her time following the orders of Humberto who now lives on the roof of the Café.

Teodoro Cabiri – A hunchbacked Filipino magician and entertainer. He met Faustino while they were at a metaphysical surgeon's office in Baguio.

King Pete – a black ex-boxer, slowed down by an encounter with the Dittos at a dance club in Stockton. Now he operates a tamale cart and recently married Queenie.

Anatoly Bogomil – A gypsy cabdriver who continues to mourn his dead wife, Anatoly has mostly lost touch with reality except for his touch on the drum skins – he plays jazz drums with the Café band. He now resides in a tent pitched outside the Café and “drives” a cab without wheels.

Raphael Viajero – Proprietor of the Silver Cloud Café. Raphael has the ability to see the “future of metals”. He understands exactly what use a metal will be put to and how it will ultimately fail.

Faustino – Marked by his immense and startling white hair, Faustino is an educated man, but he is loathed by other manong.

Bambino Reyes – Bambino is the illegitimate son of Pietro Ditto. He spent his youth tracking down his father from his hometown of Baguio, Philippines to "French Camp" near Stockton, California, only to discover that Pietro Ditto had been “murdered” by Faustino and Teodoro.

== Themes ==
=== Allegory ===
Roberto Cantú, in his article "Borders of the Self," deals extensively with the allegorical allusions within the novel. He counts Dante's Divine Comedy, Milton's Paradise Lost, and Revelations among the working allegories.

=== Migrant farm workers ===
Véa dedicates Silver Cloud to immigrant farmers calling them the, "gentle protectors and messengers of my brown youth". Additionally, in an interview with Marquez, Véa said, that his second novel was about "migrant farmers", "both earthly and unearthly, and their harvest is both of this world and out of this world".

== Sources ==
- Aldama, Frederick Luis. Spilling the Beans in Chicanolandia: conversations with writers and artists. U of Texas, Austin: 2006.
- Cantú, Roberto. "Alfredo Véa Jr." Dictionary of Literary Biography, Volume 209: Chicano Writers, Third Series. Ed. Francisco A. Lomelí. U of California S.B. The Gale Group, 1999: 281-9.
- Cantú Roberto. "Borders of Self in Alfredo Véa's The Silver Cloud Café. Studies in 20th Century Literature. 25.1 Dec. 2001. <www.wilsonweb.org>.
- Véa, Alfredo Jr. The Silver Cloud Café. Dutton, New York: 1996.
- ---. La Maravilla. Dutton, New York: 1993.
- ---. Gods Go Begging. Dutton, New York: 1999.
