= Etxauri =

Etxauri Echauri
- Municipality
- Etxauri (Basque)
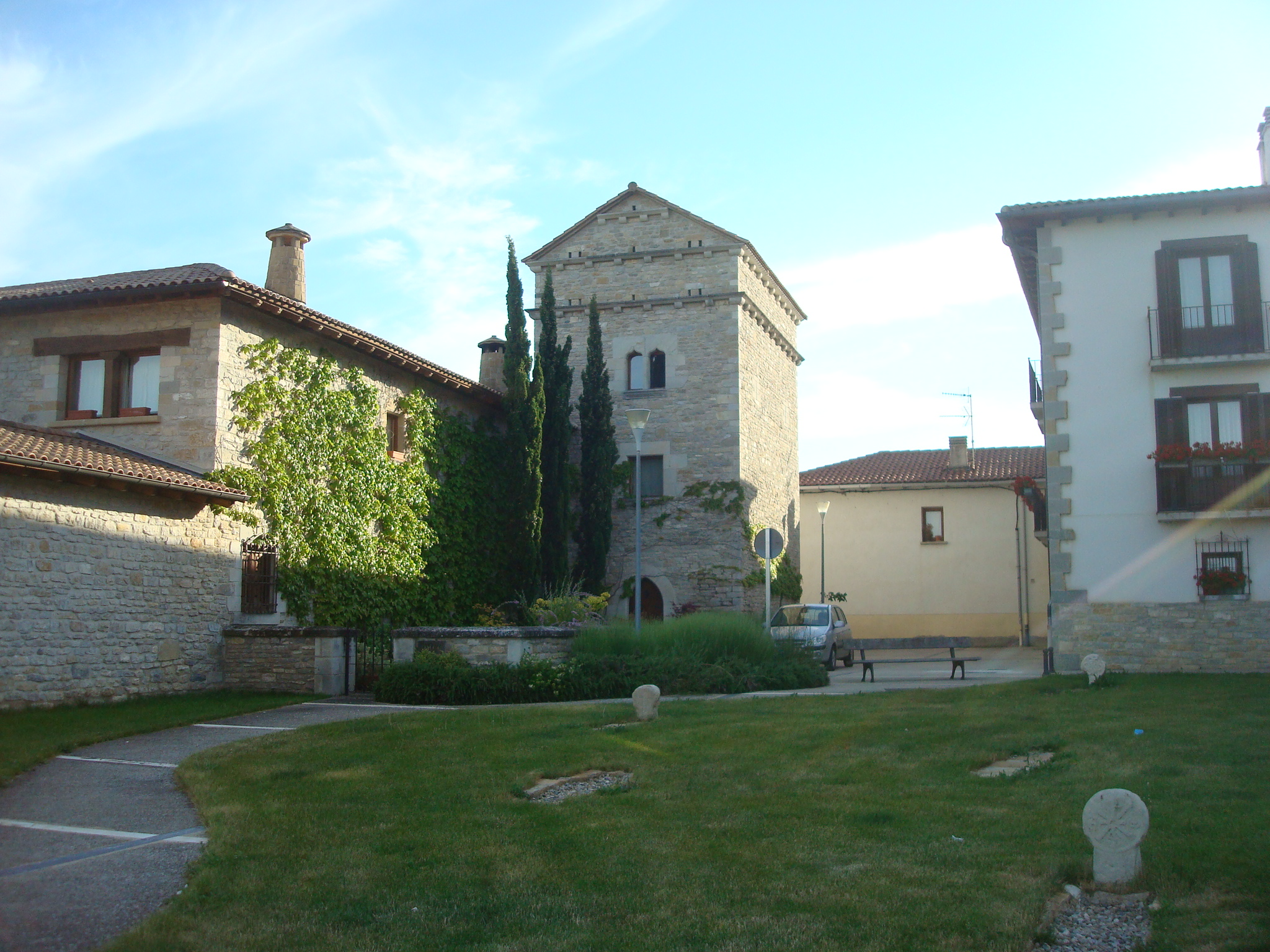

- Coat of arms

- Location of Etxauri within Navarre Location of Etxauri within Spain
- Coordinates: 42°47′38″N 1°47′24″W
- Country: Spain
- Autonomous Community: Navarre
- Province: Navarre
- Comarca: Cuenca de Pamplona

Government
  - Mayor (2015- ): Idoia Aritzala Etxarren (EH Bildu)

Area
  - Total: 13.64 km^{2} (5.27 sq mi)
- Elevation (AMSL): 412 m (1,352 ft)

Population (2025-01-01)
  - Total: 671
  - Density: 49.2/km^{2} (127/sq mi)
- Time zone: UTC+1 (CET)
  - Summer (DST): UTC+2 (CEST)
- Postal code: 31174
- Area code: +34 948
- Website: www.etxauri.eus

Etxauri is a town and municipality located in the province and autonomous community of Navarre, northern Spain.

== Notable people ==
- Esteban Ezcurra Arraiza (1888–1964), Carlist politician
