= Daniel Panetta =

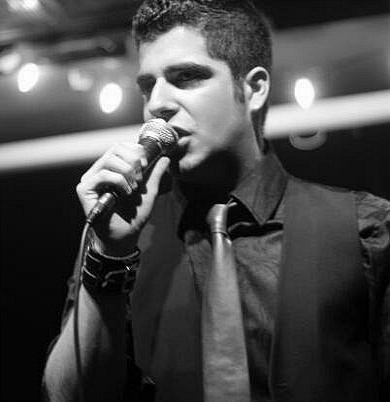

Background information
- Also known as: Danny Payne
- Born: March 24, 1992 (age 34)
- Origin: Angus, Ontario, Canada
- Genres: Alternative rock, pop rock, jazz, opera
- Occupations: Singer-songwriter, musician, pianist
- Instruments: Vocals, piano, keyboard, guitar, saxophone, bass guitar, drums, percussion
- Years active: 1997–present
- Labels: 3PK Productions, Indie Connect
- Member of: St.Yesterday
- Website: sxyband.com

Daniel Panetta (born March 24, 1992), also known as Danny Payne is a Canadian singer, songwriter, musician and producer. In addition to his solo career, he is also the vocalist for the alternative rock band St.Yesterday. He was born in Angus, Ontario.

== Early career ==
Panetta began singing at age five inspired by Elvis Presley. In October 2006 he received a bursary award from the York Region Media Group Celebration of the Arts, and as of 2010 has performed at over 830 events including; the Semaine Italienne Festival in Montreal, Quebec the SOS Abruzzo-Earthquake Relief gala, the Montreal Jazz Festival and the Calgary UNICEF charity gala.

While attending St. Elizabeth Catholic High School Panetta collaborated with classical vocalist Natalie Choquette for her record "Terra Mia" and that same year performed at the Beaches Jazz Festival in Toronto making him one of the youngest performers to ever take the stage at the event.

In 2008 Panetta was signed by former Canadian Idol judge Farley Flex and after recording a short demo CD released his first independent pop-rock record titled "Unleashed" in 2011. A year later in 2012 he was selected to perform at the "Una Voce per Padre Pio" (A Voice for Padre Pio in the World) tribute concert in Pietrelcina, Italy honoring the late Luciano Pavarotti. Following the Italian tribute concert and a performance at the Brampton Powerade Centre, he released his second independent record titled "The Closer I Get"

== Musical style ==
Although classically trained in both opera and jazz, Panetta lends himself to a variety of different genres including; pop-rock, Motown, R&B alternative rock and folk. In addition to English, he sings in Italian, French, Spanish and German.

== Personal life ==
Currently residing in Toronto, Ontario, Panetta graduated from Humber College in 2013.

== Discography ==
Solo

- Shut the Darkness Down - Single (2019)
- Don't You Worry - Single (2018)
- The Closer I Get (2012)
- Unleashed (2011)

With St.Yesterday

- Almost There (2016)
- Falling (2015)

=== As featured artist ===
Song	Year	Artist	Album
"Non Ti Scordar Di Me"	2008	Natalie Choquette	Terra Mia!
