= Mount Josephine =

Mount Josephine, may refer to:

- Mount Josephine (Antarctica)
- Mount Josephine (British Columbia)
- Mount Josephine (Minnesota)
