= Alfredo Véa Jr. =

American novelist

- Born: June 28, 1950 (age 76); Arizona
- Occupations: Lawyer and novelist
- Known for: La Maravilla; The Silver Cloud Café; Gods Go Begging; The Mexican Flyboy

Alfredo Véa Jr. (born 28 June 1950) is a Mexican-Yaqui-Filipino-American lawyer and novelist who has written four novels: La Maravilla (1993), The Silver Cloud Café (1996), Gods Go Begging (1999), which the Los Angeles Times named one of the best books of 1999, and The Mexican Flyboy, which won a 2017 American Book Award.

== Biography ==
Alfredo Véa was born in the desert near Phoenix, Arizona "around 1950; nobody knows" to Lorenza Carvajal, a thirteen year old of Yaqui and Spanish ancestry. Although La Maravilla copyright page lists his birth year as 1952, he later designated June 28, 1950 as the date of his birth. He grew up in the "Buckeye Road" barrio near Phoenix, where he lived with his Mexican grandparents, Manuel Carvajal and Josephina Castillo de Carvajal, who passed on to him their Spanish and Yaqui heritages. Thus, Véa's small-town environment was multicultural and multilingual and provided him a strong sense of mestizo identity that informs his writing. His mother, who had left him with her parents when he was six (his father having never been a part of the picture), returned when he was ten to take him with her to her new family in California, where he worked as a migrant farmworker alongside Mexican and French Canadian braceros and where he learned to read and write from his Filipino friends. Eventually, he was placed in Livermore High School at the 10th-grade level, and was mentored by a teacher named Jack Beery, to whom Véa dedicated La Maravilla.

After high school, Véa attended the University of California, Berkeley and spent some time living among the Yaqui in Sonora, Mexico, but was drafted into the Army and sent to the Vietnam War in 1968. After returning from Vietnam in 1969, Véa worked as a truck driver and fork life operator. In 1970, he moved to Paris and worked as a janitor at Le Cordon Bleu, before he was caught by immigration officials and returned to the States. In 1971, he returned to Berkeley, eventually getting undergraduate degrees in English and Physics in 1975 and, in 1978, his J.D. degree. He worked first for the Centro Legal de la Raza (Legal Center of the People) and then from 1980 to 1986 in the San Francisco Public Defender's Office before entering private practice and specializing in death penalty cases. His experiences as a lawyer inspired his writing career; he has said that he started writing in 1989, after the judge on one of his cases stated he hadn't been aware that there were any Mexican lawyers.

== Professional life ==
Véa uses his personal experiences in his novels; for instance, the lead character in La Maravilla is a young boy living with his grandparents (Yaqui and Mexican) in small town outside Phoenix, separated from his mother, who appears only at the end of the novel to take him to California. Similarly, his time in France forms part of the story in Gods Go Begging. Véa also uses his experiences as a lawyer and as a Vietnam veteran in his work; the Los Angeles Times called it "a meditation on the Vietnam War and on race, desire, and urban gang wars." Véa has said that both his law work and his novels help him deal with his experiences in Vietnam, joking that "Mexicans don't go to psychiatrists. We don't get massages."

His literary work also influences his legal work, using his storytelling skills in the courtroom. One of his colleagues describes him as "a renaissance trial attorney" who, while in court, "would draw upon his vast interests and knowledge of the classics, literature and, in particular, the struggles of people of color." He once closed an argument with stories about Joan of Arc, Marie Antoinette and his own childhood.

== Bibliography ==
- La Maravilla (1993)
- The Silver Cloud Café (1996)
- Gods Go Begging (1999)
- The Mexican Flyboy (2016)
