= My Girl Josephine =

Single by Fats Domino

from the album ...A Lot of Dominos!
- B-side: "Natural Born Lover"
- Released: 1960
- Genre: Rhythm and blues
- Length: 2:00
- Label: Imperial
- Songwriters: Fats Domino; Dave Bartholomew

Fats Domino singles chronology
| "Put Your Arms Around Me Honey" (1960) | "My Girl Josephine" (1960) | "Natural Born Lover" (1960) |

"My Girl Josephine" is a song written by Fats Domino and Dave Bartholomew. Domino recorded the song on Imperial Records (Imperial 5704) in 1960, and it charted at number 7 on the Billboard R&B charts and number 14 on the Billboard pop charts. The song is also listed and recorded as "Josephine" and "Hello Josephine" in various cover versions.

== Charts ==
Chart performance for "My Girl Josephine" by Super Cat featuring Jack Radics
| Chart (1995) | Peak position |
|---|---|
| Australia (ARIA) | 26 |
| Belgium (Ultratop 50 Flanders) | 33 |
| Belgium (Ultratop 50 Wallonia) | 40 |
| New Zealand (Recorded Music NZ) | 6 |
| UK Singles (OCC) | 32 |

== See also ==
- "Josephine" (Wayne King song), also covered by Bill Black's Combo
