= Julian C. Josey Jr. =

American radiation oncologist

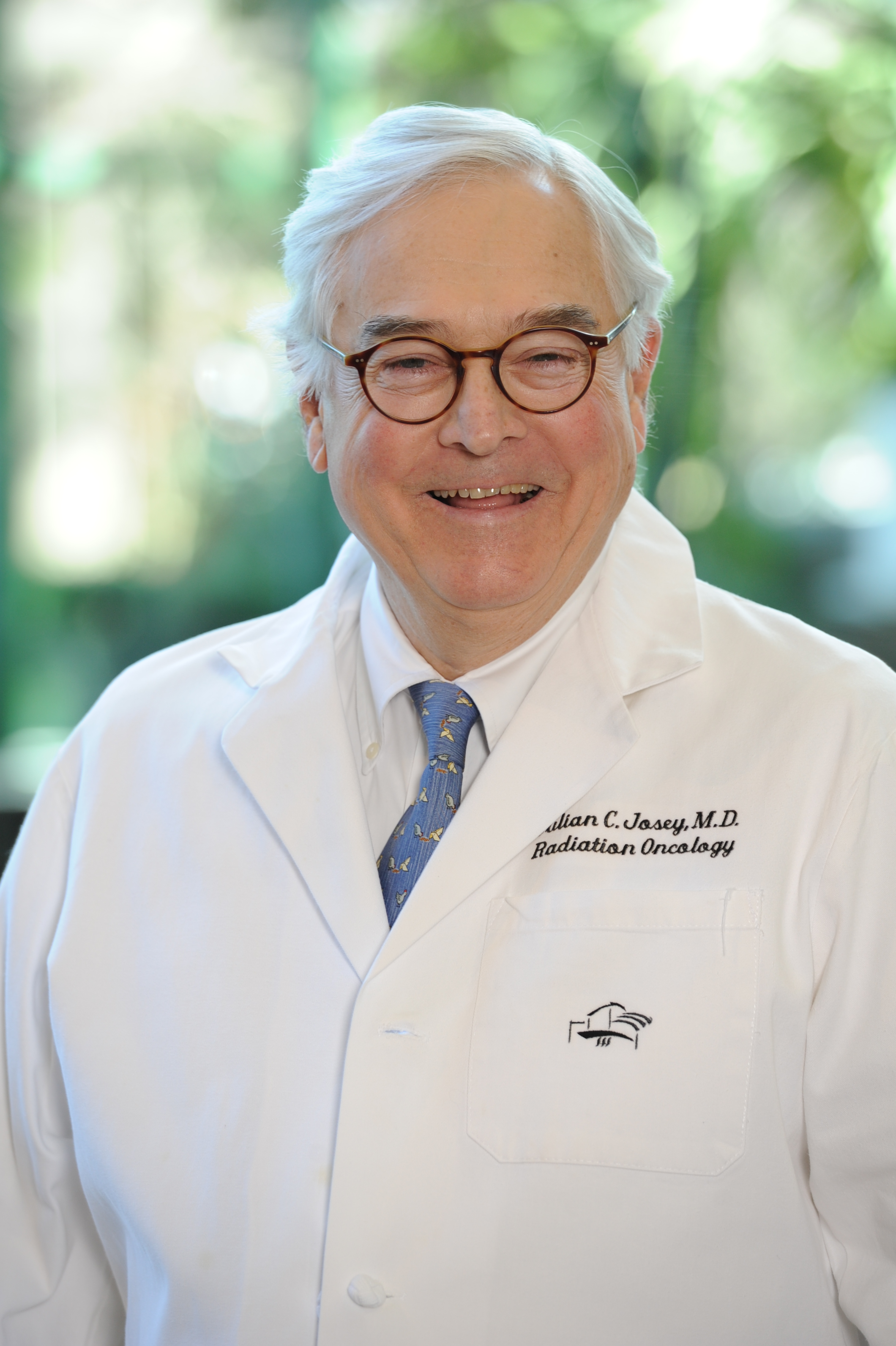
Dr. Julian C. Josey Jr.

Julian C. Josey Jr. (March 20, 1938 – May 10, 2021) was a radiation oncologist at the Gibbs Cancer Center & Research Institute in Spartanburg, South Carolina. A native of Spartanburg, he had been a leader in the diagnosis and treatment of cancer for more than 40 years.

== Background ==
Dr. Josey attended Washington and Lee University from 1956 through 1958, and then received a Bachelor of Science from Wofford College in 1960. He graduated from the Bowman Gray School of Medicine of Wake Forest University in 1964. He completed an internship in obstetrics and gynecology at Emory University.

== Additional training and military experience ==
After completing his internship at Emory University, Dr. Josey enlisted in the U.S. Army where he served in Army Hospitals at Fort Benjamin Harrison in Indianapolis, Indiana and with the U.S. Army, Ninth Infantry Division in Vietnam, an experience which profoundly changed his life. He received his radiation oncology training at the Henry Ford Hospital in Detroit, Michigan from 1967 through 1970.,

== Career in cancer care ==
Dr. Josey had been an advocate for bringing advanced cancer care to Upstate South Carolina. Dr. Josey had joined the Spartanburg Radiation Oncology practice at Spartanburg Regional Hospital in 1970. He and his colleague and friend Dr. James Bearden had proposed the formation of a cancer center at Spartanburg Regional Hospital in 1976 that would be dedicated to the diagnosis and treatment of cancer, which eventually led to the establishment of Gibbs Cancer Center & Research Institute in 1999.

Spartanburg's Breast Health Center bears Dr. Josey's name in honor of his work, along with that of Dr. James Bearden. The Bearden–Josey Center for Breast Health opened in August 2008.

Dr. Josey had academic appointments as a clinical professor of radiology at the Medical University of South Carolina in Charleston. He was professionally affiliated with the American Medical Association, South Carolina Medical Association, South Carolina Medical Radiological Society, South Carolina Oncology Society, American Association for Therapeutic Radiology and Oncology, American College of Radiology and the Radiological Society of South Carolina. He was the former president of the Spartanburg County Medical Society and former delegate of the South Carolina Medical Society.

On October 15, 2013, Dr. Josey was presented with the Order of Palmetto, the highest honor in South Carolina, by South Carolina House Representatives Rita Allison and Eddie Tallon on behalf of Governor Nikki Haley. The gardens at Gibbs Cancer Center–Pelham were dedicated in honor of Dr. Josey during the same ceremony.
