= Livermore High School =

Coordinates: 37°40′50.49″N 121°45′41.44″W

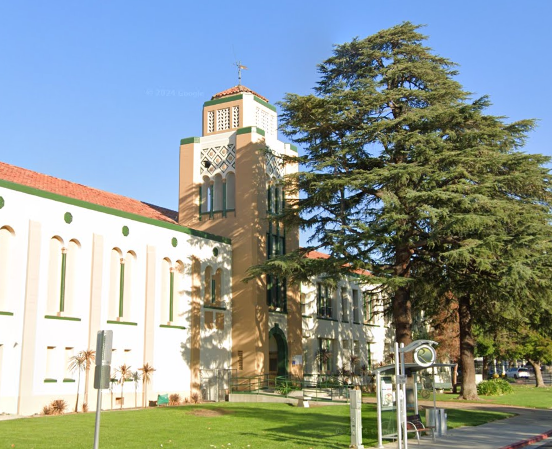
- Administration and Theater Building
- 600 Maple Street; Livermore, California 94550; United States

Information
- Type: Public high school
- Motto: It's a Great Day to be a Cowboy!
- Established: 1891
- School district: Livermore Valley Joint Unified School District
- Principal: Roxana Mohammed
- Teaching staff: 85.24 (FTE)
- Grades: 9-12
- Enrollment: 1,827 (2024-2025)
- Student to teacher ratio: 21.43
- Colors: Green and gold
- Mascot: Cowboy
- Newspaper: El Vaquerito
- Yearbook: El Vaquero
- Website: Livermore High School

Founded in 1891, Livermore High School is a public high school located in the city of Livermore, California, United States. It is one of two comprehensive high schools in the Livermore Valley Joint Unified School District, with Granada High School being the other. In 2007, it was chosen as one in four schools in Alameda County to receive the California Distinguished School award.

== Academics ==
Livermore High School is home to the Green Engineering Academy, a program to promote engineering through hands-on learning activities and applications of engineering to all areas of the students academics. The GEA is open to about 60 students per year. In October 2012, the GEA won the Golden Bell Award for outstanding academic programs in a California classroom. The GEA gained further success and publicity through students' audits of Bay Area schools, being featured on ABC 7 News, CBS 5 News, and KQED 88.5 FM radio, the Alameda County Office of Education and PG&E. A number of Advanced Placement courses are offered. Livermore High School is also a member of the Tri-Valley Regional Occupation Program (ROP), hosting a number of ROP classes.

== Athletics ==
Under Livermore cross country coach Ed Salazar, the cross country team set a NCS record with seven straight section titles from 1990-1996. During this period Micheil Jones (1994) and Joe Smith (1995) won individual state cross country titles.

Under coach Nick Winter, the cross-country team won two consecutive NCS Meet of Champions titles in 1981 and 1982.

The Livermore lacrosse team was created in 2006. At the end of the 2008 season, four team members were named East Bay Athletic League Honorable Mention players.

== Campus ==
A new 49,000-square foot gymnasium facility was completed in June 2022. The building contains a main gym, wrestling room, and dance studio. Construction was completed ahead of schedule due to distance learning during the COVID-19 pandemic.

A new aquatics facility was also completed in the summer of 2023.

== Parent–teacher association ==
The Livermore High School Parent–Teacher Association was chartered in 2011. Its website is here. The group's purpose is to support staff, academics, and student life at LHS.

== Notable alumni ==
- Mikkel Aaland, photographer
- Rae Carson, novelist
- Troy Dayak: professional soccer player with the San Jose Earthquakes
- Delbert Gee: Alameda County Superior Court Judge
- Duane Glinton: professional soccer player
- Gavin Glinton: professional soccer player
- J. R. Graham: professional baseball player
- Randy Johnson (Class of 1982), Major League Baseball pitcher (1988–2009) for the Montreal Expos, Seattle Mariners, Houston Astros, Arizona Diamondbacks, New York Yankees, and San Francisco Giants; inducted into the Baseball Hall of Fame on July 26, 2015
- Ashley Padilla (Class of 2011): actress, Saturday Night Live cast member
- Chris Pane: professional football player
- Danny Payne: professional soccer player
- Marcus Peters: professional football player (attended, but did not graduate)
- Brandon Rogers: YouTuber
- Bryan Shaw (Class of 2005): Major League Baseball pitcher (2011–present) for Arizona Diamondbacks, Cleveland Indians, and Colorado Rockies
- Alfredo Véa Jr.: lawyer and novelist
- Andy Weir, novelist
