= Josie =

Josie may refer to:

== People ==
- Josie (name), various people and fictional characters with the given name, a diminutive of Josephine
- Edith Josie (1921–2000), Canadian writer and newspaper columnist
- Peter Josie, Saint Lucia politician

== Music ==
- Josie Records, a record label
- "Josie" (Blink-182 song), a 1998 single
- "Josie" (Donovan song), a 1966 single
- "Josie" (Steely Dan song), a song on the 1977 album Aja and 1978 single
- "Josie", a song by the Glorious Sons from their 2017 album Young Beauties and Fools

== Other uses ==
- Josie Township, Holt County, Nebraska
- Josie (TV series), a 1991 TV series starring Josie Lawrence
- Josie (film), a 2018 thriller film starring Dylan McDermott

== See also ==
- Josephine (disambiguation)
- Josey (disambiguation)
