= Josey =

Josey is an abbreviated form of the given name Joseph. Notable people with the name include:

- Josey Garcia, American politician
- Josey Jewell (born 1994), American football player
- Josey Little (1821–1877), British jockey and soldier
- Josey Montana McCoy, American voice actor
- Josey Rebelle, British musician
- Josey Scott (born 1972), American rock musician, singer-songwriter, and record producer
- Josey Wales (born 1956), Jamaican dancehall DJ

== Surname ==
- Alex Josey (1910–1986), British-Singaporean journalist and author
- Chase Josey (born 1995), American snowboarder
- E. J. Josey (1924–2009), American activist and librarian
- Henry Josey (born 1991), American football player
- Julian C. Josey Jr. (1938–2021), American oncologist
- Martha Josey (born 1938), American rodeo competitor
- Maurice Richard Josey (1870–1938), English mosaic artist
- Richard Josey (1840–1906), English engraver

== Fictional characters ==
- Josey Wales (character)

== See also ==
- Josie (disambiguation)
