= Josephina =

Josephina is a female name, a feminine form of Joseph. Some nicknames include Josie, Jo, Joe, and Jopie.

== Notable people ==
- Josephina Conway (born 2004), American fencer
- Josephina "Jopie" Troost (born 1942), Dutch swimmer
- Josephina Johanna "Fien" de la Mar (1898–1965), Dutch actress and cabaret performer

== Other ==
- 303 Josephina, an asteroid
- Josephina (road), a Croatian road
- Josephina the Whale, a Japanese anime television series
- "Josephina", a song by Van Halen from Van Halen III

== See also ==
- Joe (disambiguation)
- Josefina (disambiguation)
- Josephine (disambiguation)
