= Natalie Choquette =

French Canadian soprano (born 1959)

Natalie Choquette (French pronunciation: [natali ʃɔkɛt]; born 1959) is a French Canadian soprano.

== Life ==
Choquette was born in Tokyo to Canadian diplomats. She grew up in Lima, Peru, Boston, Rome, Montreal, and Moscow. Choquette studied at Institut Saint-Dominique. She graduated from Collège International Marie de France, and from Université de Montréal, where she studied with Roland Richard. She has received an honorary doctorate from the University of Ottawa.

She won four Félix Awards, in classical music and has sold over 100,000 albums. Covering the following styles: Opera, Classical, Sacred Music, New Age as well as Popular. She has three daughters. She has performed all over the world. Choquette has recorded in over a dozen languages including Chinese, Arabic, Russian, Yiddish, Portuguese, Japanese, Greek and more; she also speaks several languages fluently including French, English, Spanish, Italian as well as functional German, Arabic and Russian.

Since 2011, Choquette has performed as Mimi in La Diva Malbouffa, a children's show which has toured in several hundred schools across Canada. The show was also presented in St Petersburg in the Russian language. In 2011, she appeared with the Belgian Royal Air Force Band.

In addition to conventional opera, she has also frequently performed comedic opera shows as La Fettucini. In 2024, she appeared in the 17th series of Britain's Got Talent, in a controversial audition which climaxed with her dumping a pot of spaghetti over Simon Cowell's head; according to Choquette, she had been courted to appear on the series for several years before finally agreeing, and it had been the production team's idea to have the performance conclude with her throwing food, which is not ordinarily part of that number when she does it in her La Fettucini shows.

== Personal life ==
She is the mother of Florence Khoriaty, a singer known as Florence K, through her past relationship with the musician Hany Khoriaty. She is also the mother of Ariane and Éléonore born through a relationship with Eric Lagacé. She is a cousin of the politician Jérôme Choquette.

Choquette is heavily involved in charity causes representing several prestigious organizations. She was the official spokesperson for La Fondation Québécoise du Cancer, helping the foundation raise over $30,000 for their cancer centres in Quebec. In the course of her duties, she appeared on several television shows featuring cooking and healthy eating habits with famed Quebec physician Dr. Marcel Béliveau and Swiss author (Anticancer) and cancer researcher Dr Servan Schreiber. Choquette is also associated with the Quebec chapter of the Heart and Stroke Foundation of Canada.

== Discography ==
CDs

- La Diva (1995)
- Diva II (1997)
- Diva Luna (1998)
- Le Noël de la Diva (2002)
- La Diva et Le Maestro (2002)
- Aeterna (2004)
- Aeterna Celesta (2006)
- Romantica (2007)
- Aterna - Romantica (2007)
- Terra Mia (2008)
- Lux Aeterna: La Trilogie (2008)
- Terra Bella (2009)
- La Diva Malbouffa (2011)

DVDs

- Natalie Choquette: La Diva (2006)
