= La Maravilla =

Novel by Alfredo Véa, Jr.

- La Maravilla by Alfredo Véa Jr.
- Author: Alfredo Véa Jr.
- Language: English
- Publisher: Dutton
- Publication date: 1 April 1993
- Publication place: United States
- Media type: Print (hardback & paperback)
- Pages: 320 pp
- ISBN: 978-0-525-93588-9
- OCLC: 27012485
- Dewey Decimal: 813/.54 20
- LC Class: PS3572.E2 M37 1993
- Followed by: The Silver Cloud Café

La Maravilla (English: The Wonder) is the first novel by Alfredo Véa Jr., published on April 1, 1993. According to the Penguin Groups USA website, it has "become a minor classic of Chicano literature and a core text in Latin studies programs."

== Plot introduction ==
=== Explanation of the novel's title ===
"La Maravilla" has a double meaning connected to the passing on to another world, Mictlan. La maravilla means the flowers placed upon the graves of the dead. However, it is also the name given to the dog who leads the living to Mictlan.

The title is also an allusion to Alejo Carpentier's term "lo real maravilloso americano", "marvelous American reality". For Carpentier, the marvelous aspect of reality comes from America itself.

== Plot summary ==
The novel centers on a young boy named Beto, who has been left by his mother to be raised by his Spanish grandmother Josephina and Yaqui grandfather Manuel, both of whom carry on the spiritual traditions of their cultural heritages, Manuel as a shaman and Josephina as a curandera. The two grandparents each pass on to Beto the knowledge they have preserved, in order to prepare him to return to his mother and enter the larger world.

Although the novel centers on Beto around his grandparents, it presents a picture of their 1958 community, a spot-in-the-road outpost of Phoenix, Arizona known at the time as "Buckeye Road" (and which has since become part of the metropole under the name Buckeye). Buckeye Road contains an assortment of characters from various ethnicities: Native Americans, Mexican Americans, Euroamericans, African Americans, even Chinese and Hindu residents. It seems to be a town built by outsiders, including not only ethnic minorities but prostitutes, lesbians and transvestites.

Véa uses this collection of people to explore not only the intersection of ethnic marginalization, but also the similarities and overlaps between spiritual traditions. Véa allows a place for Latino Catholicism, African American Christianity, peyote shamanism and Creole spirituality in this generous novel.

== Characters ==
- Beto: Child of Lola, grandchild to Manuel and Josephina. the main character
- Josephina: a Spanish immigrant who sees herself as a faithful Roman Catholic and therefore tries to interfere with her husband's Native American influence on Beto. She is also a curandera who tries to use her spiritual powers to help her neighbors in the town, including Vernetta, Boydeen, and Wysteria Maybelle.
- Manuel: Married to Josephina, comes from a native background.
- Vernetta: Prostitute who lives in trailer beside Josephina and Manuel
- J.B.: Vernetta's true love and the father of her child, a bright young man who wanted to become a physicist but was brutally killed instead after being caught with Vernetta in the Jim Crow south
- Boydeen: a young woman who kills her lover Hiawatha in jealousy and has to be protected by Josephina's powers; after being healed, she uses her skills as a stenographer to document all the important events and transactions in the town
- Claude and Louie: the "Arkie" boys, friends of Beto
- Potrice and Sugar Dee: the local prostitutes; also lesbian lovers
- the maricones: a group of five transvestites
- Onan and Odabee
- the Blue Moon
- Salvador
- Eduardo Corral: The mentor of Beto who helps him figure out how to survive in the harsh environment
- Lola and Joe: Beto's mom and her new partner; she left Buckeye Road years ago in search of more freedom in America.
- Steven Lin: Tricks Beto but later betrays him and ends up in Beto losing his eye.
- Wysteria Maybelle
- Harold: the Fuller Brush Salesman whom Josephina befriends
- Apache: Josephina and Manuel's dog, missing for three years; Josephina fears that if he returns, he will be La Maravilla, and dog associated in Aztec legends as a sign of impending death

== Major themes ==
Motherhood is a prevalent theme in the novel. The character of Josephina becomes a mother figure to her grandson Beto, whose biological mother Lola has left Buckeye Road to become "Americanized." Lola accuses Josephina of trapping her as a teenager, neither talking to her about the realities of womanhood nor allowing her to go out with her friends on the weekends. Vernetta is a woman abandoned by her entire family. While her abusive father and brothers shun her for her involvement with a black man, it is her mother's desertion that hurts her most. The South American myth of "La Llorona" is relevant to the text in terms of motherhood, as well. The myth manifests itself in the novel through the mothers who emotionally harm their children (Josephina's emotional distance from Lola) and through the children who are troubled by their pasts (Lola's repressed memories erupting at the end of the novel). The theme of motherhood also exists within the realm of the land. The only Native American tribe unaffected by the loss of their "motherland" is the Yaqui because they were never forcibly removed it.

The socially marginalized writing from the underground is a relevant theme in the novel. Buckeye Road is an amalgamation of individuals and groups who exist on the periphery of American society. Until Boydeen begins to type, their voices sound only within the confines of this insular society. Through her character, who ceases to speak and disappears to the basement of the local convenience store after she kills her abusive boyfriend Hiawatha, the myriad voices of Buckeye Road are recorded; therefore they exist. She is the "recorder" of the events of Buckeye Road, and because of her documentation, their lives have a center.

== Publication history ==
- 1993, USA, Dutton ISBN 978-0-525-93588-9, publication date 1 April 1993, hardback and paperback

== See also ==
- Magic realism
- List of Mexican American writers

== Sources, external links, quotations ==
- Alaimo, Stacy. "Multiculturalism and Epistemic Rupture: The Vanishing Acts of Guillermo Gómez-Peña and Alfredo Véa Jr." MELUS, 2000 Summer; 25 (2): 163-85. (accessed 29 February 2008) online at JSTOR
- Carlston, Erin G. "Making the Margins Chaos: Romantic and Antiromantic Readings of La Maravilla", Aztlán: A Journal of Chicano Studies 30.2 (Fall 2005), 113 - 135. online
- Pisarz-Ramírez, Gabriele. "Bilingual, Interlingual-Language and Identity Construction in Mexican American Literary Discourse." Holding Their Own: Perspectives on the Multi-Ethnic Literatures of the United States. Ed. Dorothea Fischer-Hornung and Heike Raphael-Hernandez. Tübingen, Germany: Stauffenburg, 2000. pp. 67–75. (book article)
