= Mount Josephine (Minnesota) =

Mountain in Minnesota, United States

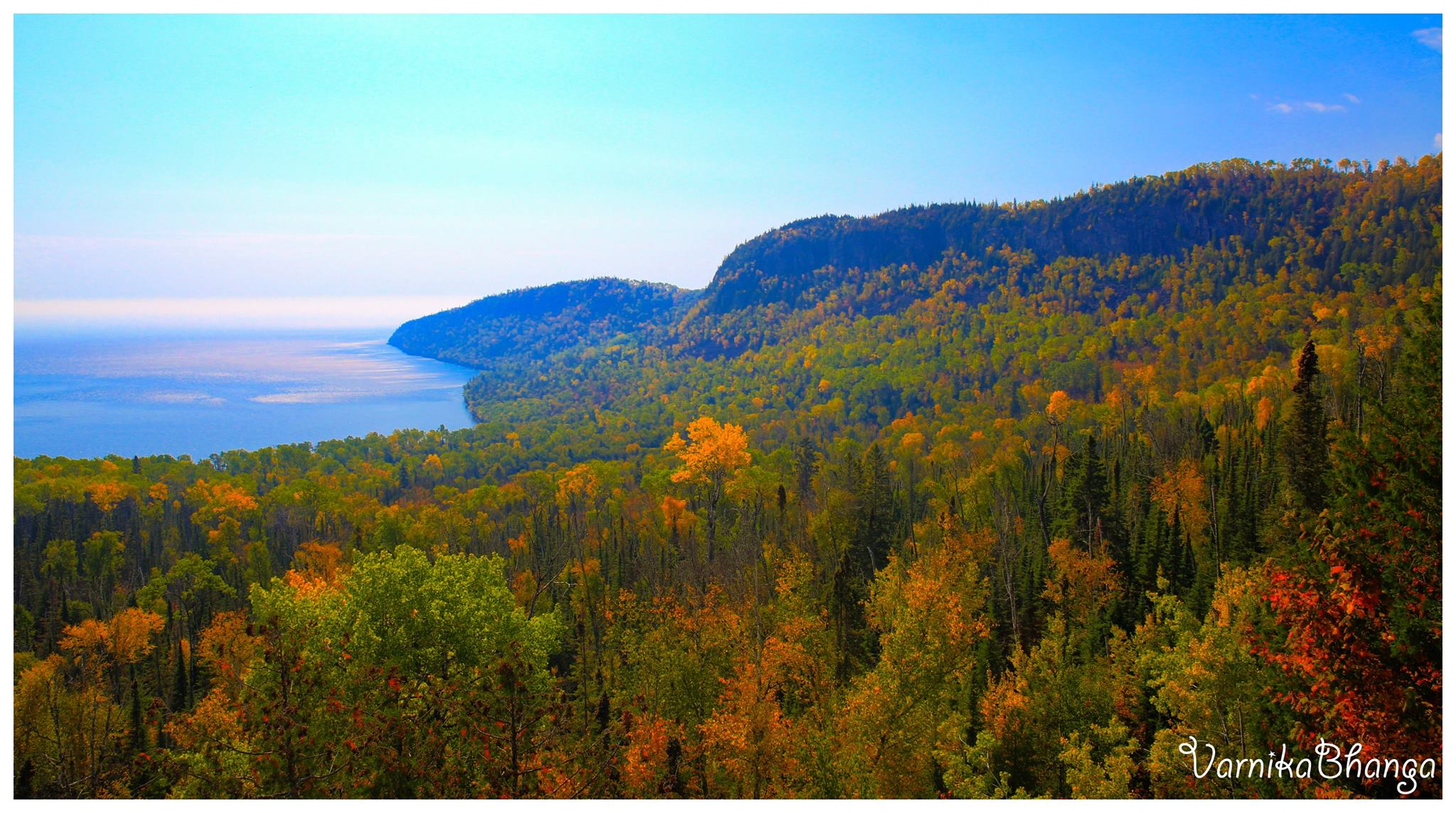
- Mount Josephine from a way side overlook on MN 61E scenic highway in Grand Portage, Minnesota, U.S.

Highest point
- Elevation: 1,342 ft (409 m)
- Coordinates: 47°59′00″N 89°39′33″W

Geography
- Location within Minnesota
- Location: Cook County, Minnesota, U.S.
- Parent range: Sawtooth Mountains

Mount Josephine is a peak in the Sawtooth Mountains of northeastern Minnesota, in the United States. It overlooks Grand Portage Bay of Lake Superior.

== History ==
The mountain was named in honor of a young woman, Josephine Godfrey of Detroit, Michigan, who led a party of young friends on a daylong excursion from Grand Portage, Minnesota to the summit in 1853. Miss Godfrey's father, John Godfrey, owned a trading post at the present site of Grand Marais, Minnesota until 1858.

View from Mount Josephine
