= Sartaguda =

Municipality of Spain

Coordinates: 42°23′N 2°03′W

Sartaguda is a town and municipality located in the province and autonomous community of Navarre, northern Spain. (Sartagueta in euskera)

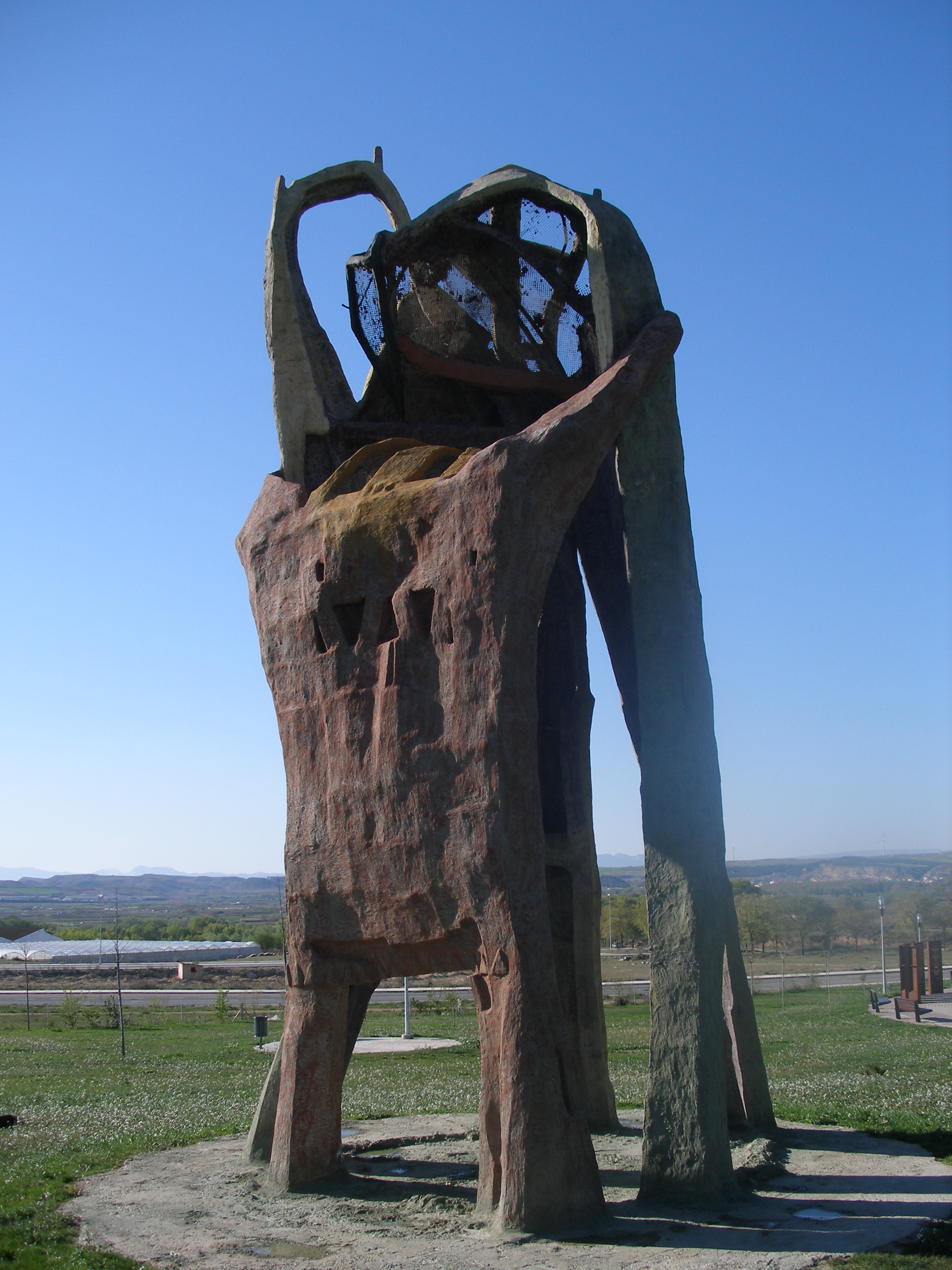
Parque de la Memoria Joxe Ulibarrena.
