= Danny Payne =

American soccer player

Personal information
- Full name: Daniel J. Payne
- Date of birth: March 6, 1957
- Place of birth: United States
- Date of death: June 10, 2005 (aged 48)
- Place of death: Pleasanton, California, United States
- Position: Midfielder

Youth career
- 1975–1978: Chico State

Senior career*
Years	Team	Apps	(Gls)
1979–1980	Sacramento Gold		
1981	Atlanta Chiefs	9	(0)
1982	Georgia Generals		
1983	Carolina Lightnin'		
- * Club domestic league appearances and goals

Daniel J. Payne was an American soccer midfielder who spent six seasons in the American Soccer League and one in the North American Soccer League.

== Youth ==
Payne grew up in Livermore, California. He attended Livermore High School where he was a four-year varsity soccer player. He then attended Chico State University where he was a 1978 Honorable Mention (third team) All American soccer player. He graduated with a bachelor's degree in accounting in 1982. Payne was inducted into the Chico State Athletic Hall of Fame in 1999.

== Professional ==
In 1979, the Sacramento Gold of the American Soccer League drafted Payne and he signed with the Gold on March 29, 1979. That season, the Gold won the league championship. The Oakland Stompers of the North American Soccer League drafted Payne, but he never played for their first team. Instead, in 1981, he played nine games with the Atlanta Chiefs. The Chiefs folded at the end of the season and in 1982, Payne moved to the Georgia Generals of the ASL. He finished his career with the Carolina Lightnin'. After his retirement, he moved to Pleasanton, California where he founded an accounting firm.

He died of cancer on June 10, 2005.
