= Daniel Payne (cricketer) =

Australian cricketer (born 1978)

Personal information
- Born: 27 October 1978 (age 48); Brisbane, Queensland, Australia
- Source: Cricinfo, 6 October 2020

Daniel Payne (born 27 October 1978) is an Australian cricketer. He played in ten first-class and nine List A matches for Queensland between 2001 and 2003.

== See also ==
- List of Queensland first-class cricketers
