= Victims of Civil War in Navarre =

The Victims of the Civil War in Navarre resulted from the repression exerted by the rebel forces strong in the area during and following the July 1936 coup d'état. The repression in the rearguard against dissenters and people felt to be inconvenient by the new Spanish authorities lasted for months on with a death toll of thousands.

For the next decades in Francoist Spain, the victims remained ostracized in silence and humiliation, accompanied with an absence of liabilities to the authors of the crimes committed. Around 3,500 people died during the repression period in Navarre.

== History ==
The Spanish Civil War began in Navarre, instigated by the Carlists and the Alfonsis monarchists. With the arrival of the new military governor in 1936, the general Emilio Mola, Navarre became a key piece in the uprising of 18 July 1936.

Unlike many areas in Spain, in which the rebels faced the power of the republican authorities or left-aligned groups, the uprising in Navarre was a complete success, meeting little to no resistance.

This absence of opposition did not prevent repression against the adherents and supporters of the left, resulting in many deaths. The violence affected mainly militants of the Federation of Workers of the Earth and the General Union of Workers given the predominance in the region of the Bank of Navarre, and represented mostly peasants without land. The majority of deaths came in the early months, with extrajudicial killings and removal of prisoners from custody. Fort Saint Cristóbal became a detention centre holding several hundred Republican prisoners. The detention conditions and their famous escape in May 1938, when approximately 700 prisoners broke free but were later hunted down, contributed to the number of deaths. A minor number of deaths were the result of Republican air strikes.

== Violence ==
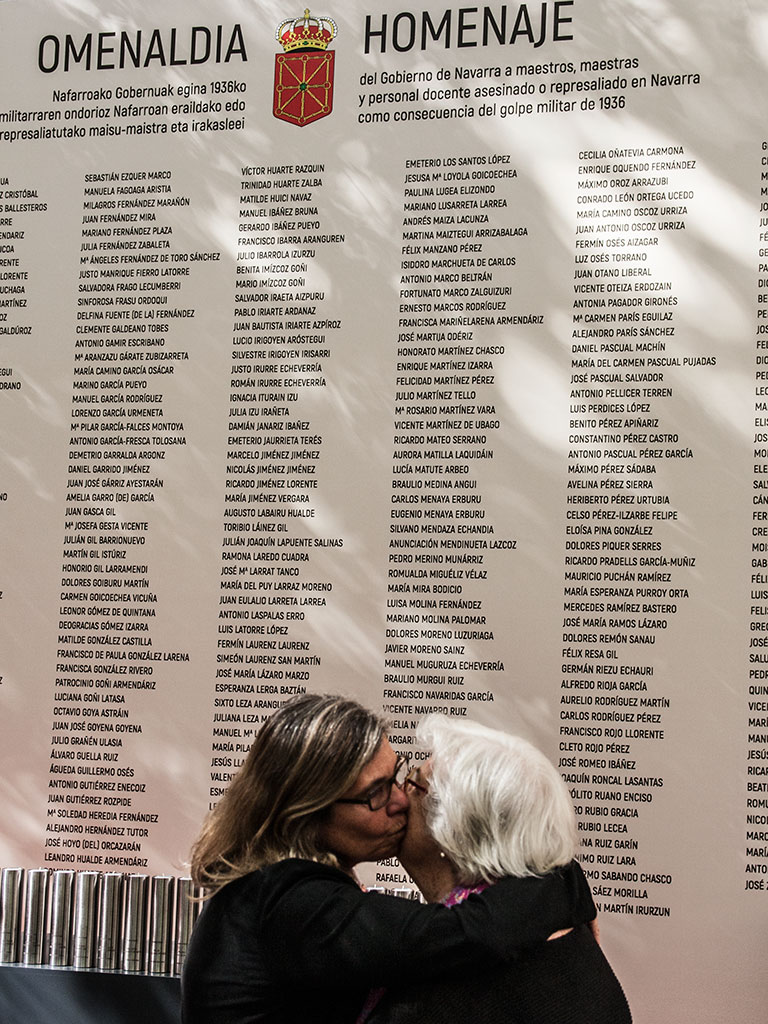
Tribute and plaque in memory of the teachers killed and cracked down on following the coup d'état at Pamplona

The political violence unleashed after the triumph of the uprising finds its roots in the political and social situation. During this period, Navarre was mainly Catholic and Conservative. The poor economy, combined with high taxes, led to high rates of emigration. The social problems of land ownership were the major factors, as during the Republican period peasants lost access to traditional communal lands (corralizas), mainly in the south of the province, to big landowners. The political tensions led to outbursts of occasional violence and confrontations while the right was in power, given the poverty of the peasants. Other political subjects of major importance during the Republican period, such as the Basque-Navarrese Statute, were not a major factor in the repression, due to the fact that Basque Catholic identity was strong and ideological differences avoided the aggregate statute.

Then and later, Francoist Spain silenced dissent and forbade public discussion of the events. Long after the installation of democracy, a number of investigations were undertaken, primarily at the behest of the victims' families. This process culminated with the publication of the extensive work Navarra 1936. De la esperanza al terror that explored the period. These studies led to the official statement of the Parliament of Navarre in 2003 that recognized the deaths during the civil war and restored the reputation of those killed.

== See also ==
- Spanish Civil War
- Red Terror (Spain)
- White Terror (Spain)
- Esteban Ezcurra Arraiza
