= Maravilhas =

- Municipality
- Location in Brazil
- Coordinates: 19°30′57″S 44°40′33″W
- Country: Brazil
- Region: Southeast
- State: Minas Gerais
- Mesoregion: Metropolitana de Belo Horizonte

Area
  - Total: 260.44 km^{2} (100.56 sq mi)

Population (2022 Census)
  - Total: 7,333
  - Estimate (2025): 7,532
  - Density: 28.03/km^{2} (72.6/sq mi)
- Time zone: UTC−3 (BRT)

Maravilhas is a municipality in the state of Minas Gerais in the Southeast region of Brazil.

== See also ==
- List of municipalities in Minas Gerais
