= Maravillas Lamberto =

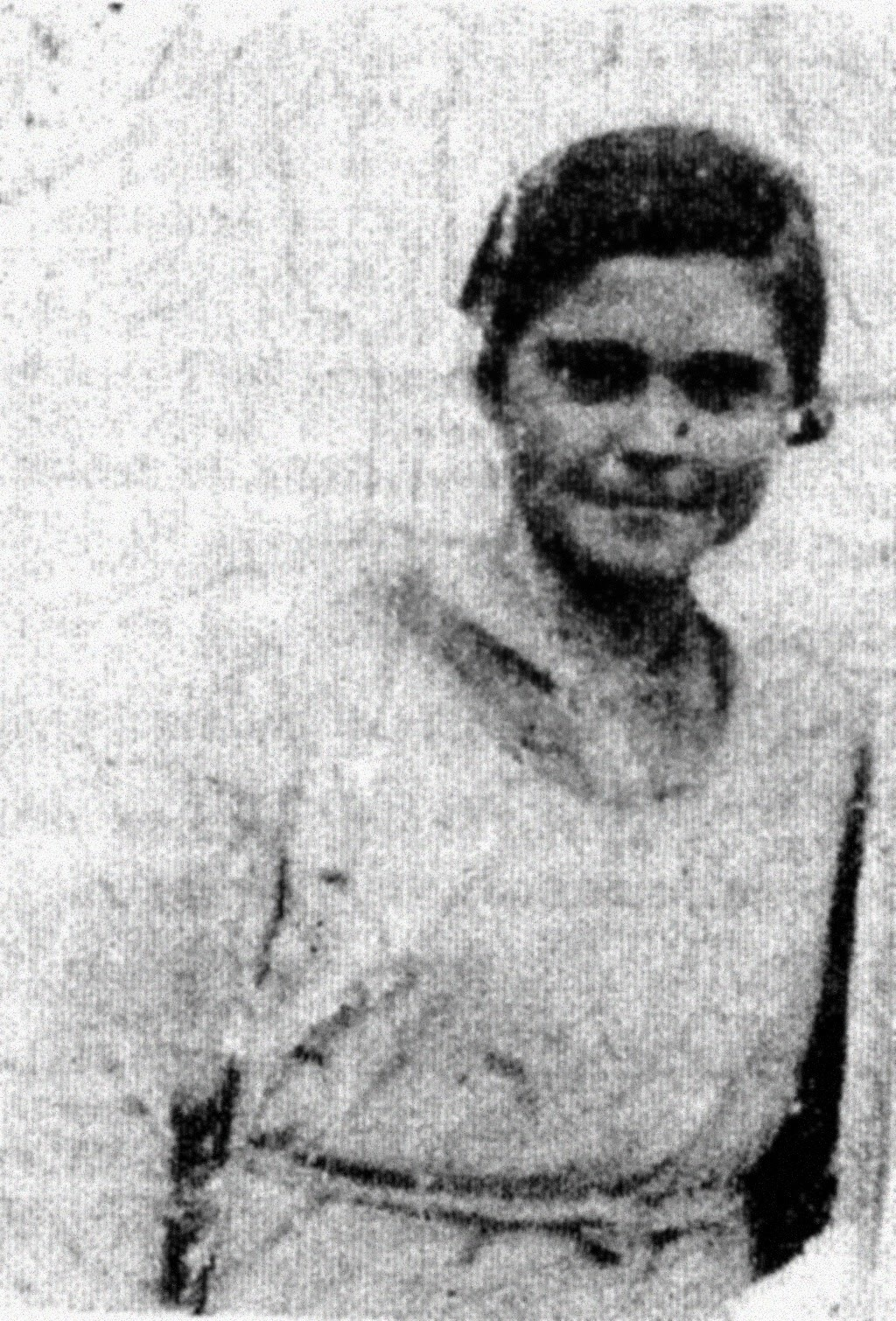
Maravillas Lamberto

Maravillas Lamberto was a 14-year-old girl from Larraga, Navarre, who was raped and killed by Falangists, part of the Nationalist faction, during the July 1936 coup d'état which started the Spanish Civil War. She is often compared to the Martyrs of Somiedo (Enfermeras mártires de Somiedo), three nurses (María Pilar Gullón Yturriaga, Octavia Iglesias Blanco and Olga Pérez-Monteserín Núñez) who were raped and shot by the Spanish Communists in 1936, and are considered victims of the Spanish Red Terror.

The uprising, spearheaded in Navarre by Carlists and General Mola's military forces, was followed by harsh repression against pro-Republican leaders and sympathizers and their families. During this repression Maravillas' father, Vicente Lamberto Martinez was also arrested and summarily executed.

After decades of silence over her case, she has become an important historic figure in Navarre. She has been remembered in memorial services across Navarre, as well as having a square named after her in Pamplona. The youth community house or gaztetxe in the city bears her name, Maravillas.

== Events ==
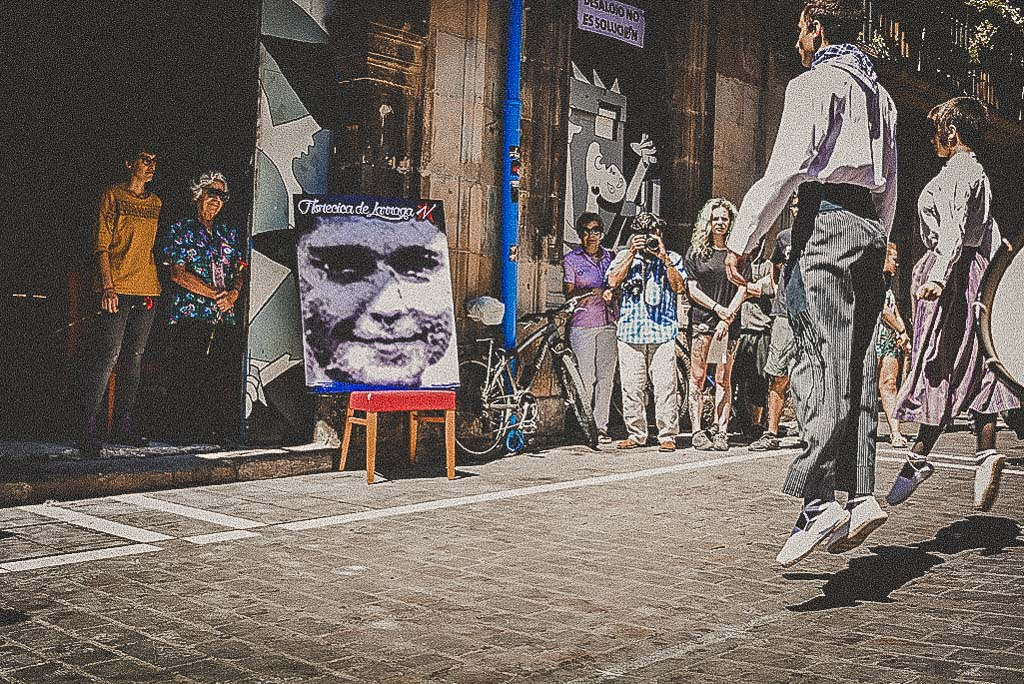
Tribute to Maravillas, Pamplona 2018

Following the coup d'état unleashing the Spanish Civil War on 18 July 1936, the village of Larraga came to be hard hit by a terror campaign waged by the Nationalist rebels on the rearguard of Navarre against the wedge of population who opposed or did not sympathise with the uprising. Vicente Lamberto Martinez, a peasant member of the union Unión General de Trabajadores, was one of another 45 residents targeted in the village.

On the night of 15–16 August 1936, a group consisting of civil guards, a Falangist and a local arrived at the house of Vicente, threatening to break open the door. The officers of the Civil Guard, a paramilitary police force siding with the Nationalists, informed Vicente that he would be taken to the prison in Pamplona. Maravillas Lamberto, who was aware of the repression taking place in her village, asked about his destination and insisted on accompanying her father.

Maravillas was taken by lorry with her father to the town hall, where she was raped during the night. According to local witnesses, the screams were heard throughout the village. Then father and daughter were then reportedly taken to Ibiricu, 40 kilometres (25 mi) from Larraga, and she was again raped, in front of her father, after which their kidnappers shot them both dead. The girl's naked body was thrown to the dogs, which ate her buttocks and part of her legs. Decades later a local peasant provided a detailed account of his finding Maravilla's decomposing body a week later. The dogs were still present, and they were killed. The decomposition of the corpse was so advanced that the peasants decided to burn it.

The new Nationalist authorities subsequently arrested and imprisoned Maravillas' mother. She was later released and joined her two surviving daughters who had moved to Pamplona.

== Memory ==
After decades of silence over her case, Maravillas has become an important historic figure in Navarre. She has been remembered in memorial services across Navarre, as well as having a square named after her in Pamplona. The youth community house or gaztetxe in the city bears her name, Maravillas.

No one was held to account for the crimes committed during Franco's dictatorship. Maravilla's sister Josefina became a nun and has attended a number of memorials in honour of her sister, and has denounced the crime and impunity of its perpetrators. She is a founder of the AFFNA-36, the Association of Firing Squad Victims Families of Navarre, which filed a lawsuit in Argentina against the crimes committed in Spain during Franco's dictatorship that remain unaccounted for.
