= Josephine (Wayne King song) =

"Josephine" was a 1936 song with music by Wayne King and Burke Bivens and lyrics by Gus Kahn.

It was first recorded by Wayne King and his Orchestra and issued on Victor 25518-A, which became one of the band's best selling recordings.

== Other recordings ==
The song was covered by many artists including:

- Les Paul with Mary Ford, 1951, Its peak position was no. 12.
- Charlie Blackwell, 1959
- Paul Muench Trio, 1960
- Bill Black's Combo, 1960, peak position no. 18 on the US Hot 100
- The Lane Quintet, 1960
- The Multiple Guitars of Peter Posa, 1960
- National Singers of U.S.A., 1960
- Russ Morgan and his orchestra, 1961
- Ray Charles
- Connie Barber
- Earl Bostic and his Orchestra
- Lawrence Welk and his Champagne Music
- George Poole Orchestra
- Jim Hall (musician) and his Orchestra, 1963
- Johnny Maddox and the Rhythmasters, 1954
- Norman Lee (musician), 1964
- Russ Carlyle, 1967
- Mose Allison (jazz singer), 1987
