= Gibbs Cancer Center & Research Institute =

Cancer treatment and research facility in the United States

Coordinates: 34.9669°N 81.9402°W

- Established: 1934
- Laboratory type: Medical laboratory
- Field of research: Oncology
- Director: Michael Starnes
- Location: 380 Serpentine Drive, Spartanburg, South Carolina, United States

The Gibbs Cancer Center & Research Institute (sometimes called just Gibbs Cancer Center or, more simply, Gibbs) is a cancer treatment and research facility in Upstate South Carolina. Gibbs Cancer Center is associated with the NCI Community Cancer Centers Program and the Medical University of South Carolina. Gibbs has several locations across the upstate of South Carolina, including Comprehensive Cancer Centers at both Spartanburg Medical Center and Pelham Medical Center. Additional infusion facilities are located in Gaffney, Union, Mary Black and North Grove.

== Overview ==
Gibbs Cancer Center is the home of multiple established oncology groups:

- Medical Group of the Carolinas – Hematology Oncology
- Medical Group of the Carolinas – Surgical Oncology
- Medical Group of the Carolinas – Gynecology Oncology
- Medical Group of the Carolinas – Radiation Oncology
- Bearden-Josey Center for Breast Health

In addition, Gibbs Cancer Center has ten multidisciplinary treatment programs for each of the specific types of cancer (Breast, Cutaneous, Gastrointestinal, Genitourinary, Gynecologic, Endocrine, Head and Neck, Hematologic, Neural and Thoracic). Selected by the National Cancer Institute (NCI) to participate in the Community Clinical Oncology Program, Gibbs is the only NCI Community Cancer Centers Program (NCCCP) in the Carolinas.

Gibbs has professional patient navigators. A navigator is a specially trained registered nurse, often with advanced degrees and certifications, plus years of experience in cancer care, who is the continuous point of contact for the patient and their family throughout their cancer diagnosis, treatment and survival planning. Gibbs Cancer Center established its navigator program in 1998.

Gibbs Cancer is one of 12 community cancer centers to earn the Association of Community Cancer Centers’ 2011 Innovator Awards, in recognition of survivorship programs. Gibbs was named the first Hospital of the Future by the U.S. Department of Defense. In 2013, the medical oncology practice (Medical Group of the Carolinas – Hematology Oncology) won Gibbs another ACCC Innovator Award, this time for the integration of palliative care information.

== History ==
John Fleming established the Spartanburg Cancer Clinic in 1934, and the clinic received national accreditation in 1938. Jay Bearden and Julian Josey initiated the concept of the current cancer center in 1976 by convincing administrators at Spartanburg Regional Hospital to allow them to consolidate all existing cancer treatment and support services into a dedicated, single-floor unit, a coordinated-services approach that was virtually unheard of at the time. Bearden started the hosting of clinical trials in 1976, through collaboration with Wake Forest University.

Gibbs Cancer Center, which opened its doors in 1999, was named for Jimmy and Marsha Gibbs, who had donated a $1.2 million lead gift toward establishing the center.

Gibbs was selected to be an NCI-funded clinical oncology programs in 1983 and has been continuously funded by NCI for thirty years. Gibbs Cancer Center became an exclusive host affiliate of the MD Anderson Cancer Center in 2005 and established the Bearden-Josey Center for Breast Health in 2008. The Center collaborated with the Edward Via College of Osteopathic Medicine to build a 7,500 square foot Clinical Oncology Laboratory in order to conduct research in the fields of personalized cancer treatment, colorectal cancer treatment, cancer stem cells and regenerative medicine.

Gibbs Cancer Center opened a location in Gaffney, SC in 2011. In addition, a new location was opened in 2013 in Greer, SC, on the same campus as Pelham Medical Center.

The Greer location was expanded in 2020 with a seven-story, 191-square-foot expansion. This expanded facility is adjacent to Pelham Medical Center. The services available include surgical, medical and radiation oncology, oncology research and rehabilitation services, infusion services, CyberKnife, and genetic counseling. The facility includes centralized registration; a 120-seat conference center; a cafe; an outpatient pharmacy; a retail shop; laboratory services and a chapel.

== Leadership ==
Directors of Gibbs Cancer Center & Research Institute include:

- Michael E. Starnes Director, MBA, System Director of Oncology
- Chad Dingman, LISW-CP, Director for Integrative Medicine
- Liza Owens-West, MBA, Director of Medical Oncology and Infusion Services
- Kamara Mertz-Rivera, MA, Director of Clinical Research
- David Myers, CMD, Director of Radiation Oncology
- Stacey Williams, MPH, Director of Bearden Josey Center for Breast Health
- Adam Wilkins, DBA, Operations Manager-Oncology Division

=== Cancer Care Committee ===
The Cancer Care Committee is a multidisciplinary group of clinicians that supervises quality standards at Gibbs Cancer Center, including compliance with certification criteria, participation in continuing staff education, and review and development of new patient care practices.

== Affiliations ==
Gibbs Cancer Center & Research Institute is affiliated with and collaborates with research centers all over the country, including:

- ALLIANCE - (North Central Cancer Treatment Group, American College of Surgeons Oncology Group, Cancer and Leukemia Group B)
- NRG - (National Surgical Adjuvant Breast and Bowel Project, Gynecologic Oncology Group, Radiation Therapy Oncology Group)
- Academic & Community Cancer Research United (formerly Mayo Clinic Cancer Research Consortium)
- Clinical Trials Support Unit
- Comprehensive Cancer Center at Wake Forest University
- Duke University
- Eastern Cooperative Oncology Group
- H. Lee Moffitt Cancer Center
- Medical University of South Carolina
- National Cancer Institute of Canada
- National Surgical Adjuvant Breast and Bowel Project Foundation (FRP)
- NCI Community Cancer Centers Program
- Sarah Cannon Research Institute at Vanderbilt University
- Southwest Oncology Group
- SunCoast CCOP Research Base at the University of South Florida
- University of North Carolina-Chapel Hill Lineberger Comprehensive Cancer Center
- University of Rochester Cancer Center
