= József =

- Gender: masculine
- Language: Hungarian
- Name day: March 19

Other gender
- Feminine: Jozefa

Origin
- Language: Hebrew
- Meaning: 'he will add'

Other names
- Nicknames: Józsi, Jóska
- Cognate: Yosef
- Anglicisation: Joseph

József (Hungarian pronunciation: [ˈjoːʒɛf]) is a Hungarian masculine given name, an equivalent of 'Joseph'.

Notable people with this name include:

- József Andrusch (born 1956), Hungarian footballer
- József Bihari (1901–1981), Hungarian actor
- József Bihari (1908–1997), Hungarian linguist
- József Braun (also known as József Barna; 1901–1943), Hungarian Olympic footballer
- József Csábi (born 1967), Hungarian footballer and manager
- József Csermák (1932–2001), Hungarian hammer thrower and 1952 Olympic champion
- József Dálnoki (born 1935), Hungarian footballer and manager
- József Darányi (1905–1990), Hungarian shot putter
- József Daróczy (1885–1950), Hungarian film director
- József Deme (born 1951), Hungarian sprint canoer
- József Dzurják (born 1962), Hungarian footballer and manager
- Baron József Eötvös de Vásárosnamény (1813–1871), Hungarian writer and statesman, Minister of Education of Hungary
- József Farkas, multiple people
- József Garami (born 1939), Hungarian football manager and former player
- József Gráf (born 1946), Hungarian engineer and politician
- József Györe (1902–1985), Hungarian communist politician, Interior Minister between 1952 and 1953
- József Háda (1911–1994), Hungarian football goalkeeper
- József Havrán (born 1978), Hungarian footballer
- József Horváth, multiple people
- József Kanta (born 1984), Hungarian footballer
- József Kasza (1945–2016), ethnic Hungarian Serbian politician, economist and banker, Deputy Prime Minister of Serbia (2001–2004)
- József Kovács, multiple people
- József Kristóffy (1857–1928), Hungarian politician, Interior Minister between 1905 and 1906
- József Künsztler (1897–1951), Hungarian footballer and manager
- József Madarász (1814–1915), Hungarian lawyer and politician
- József Mészáros (1923–1997), Hungarian footballer and manager
- József Moravetz (1911–1990), Romanian footballer
- József Munk, Hungarian Olympic medalist swimmer
- József Nagy, multiple people
- József Pálinkás (born 1952), Hungarian atomic physicist and politician, Minister of Education between 2001 and 2002
- József Rácz (born 1957), Hungarian physician, psychiatrist
- József Rády (1884–1957), Hungarian fencer
- József Remecz (1907–1989), Hungarian discus thrower
- József Sir (1912–1996), Hungarian sprinter
- József Szlávy (1818–1900), Hungarian politician, Prime Minister of Hungary from 1872 to 1874
- József Szabó (born 1969), Hungarian retired swimmer and 1988 Olympic champion
- József Szájer (born 1961), Hungarian politician
- József Széll (1880–1956), Hungarian politician, Interior Minister between 1937 and 1938
- József Tóth, multiple people
- József Varga, multiple people
- József Várszegi (1910–1977), Hungarian javelin thrower
- József Vida (born 1963), Hungarian hammer thrower
- József Viola (1896–1949), Hungarian football player and coach, also known as Giuseppe Viola in Italy

== See also ==
- Joseph
- Josef
- Jozef
