= Youssoufa =

Youssoufa is a name, a variant of Yusuf. Notable people with the name include:

- Camal Youssoufa (born 1994), Comorian footballer
- Nakim Youssoufa (born 1993), Comorian footballer
- Youssoufa Moukoko (born 2004), German footballer

== See also ==
- Youssoupha (born 1979), French rapper
- Youssoupha (name)
- Yusuf
- Yosef
- Joseph
