= Youssoupha (name) =

Youssoupha is a Senegalese given name, a variant of Yusuf. Notable people with the name include:

- Youssoupha (born 1979), born Youssoupha Mabiki, French rapper
- Youssoupha Mbao (born 1990), Senegalese basketball player
- Youssoupha Fall (born 1995), Senegalese basketball player
- Youssoupha Mbengué (born 1991), Sengalese footballer
- Youssoupha Mbodji (born 2004), Senegalese footballer
- Youssoupha Ndiaye (politician) (1938-2021), Senegalese jurist and politician
- Youssoupha N'Diaye (footballer) (born 1997), Senegalese footballer
- Youssoupha Ndoye (born 1991), Senegalese basketball player
- Youssoupha Sarr (1978-2002), Senegalese sprinter
- Youssoupha Sanyang (born 2005), Gambian footballer

== See also ==
- Youssoufa
- Yusuf
- Yosef
- Joseph
