= Hohepa =

Hohepa or Hōhepa may refer to:

== People ==
Hohepa or Hōhepa is the Māori transliteration of the name Joseph, and is a common given name and surname in New Zealand.

=== Given name ===
- Hohepa (Hep) Cahill (born 1986), New Zealand rugby league player
- Hohepa (Joe) Harawira (1946–2017), Māori kaumatua
- Hohepa Komene, New Zealand weightlifter
- Hohepa (Joe) Rātima, New Zealand rugby union and rugby league player
- Hohepa Tamehana, New Zealand composer
- Hohepa Te Toiroa Tahuriorangi (born 1995), New Zealand rugby union player
- Hōhepa Te Umuroa (1820? – 1847), Māori chieftain

=== Surname ===
- Annabelle Hohepa, New Zealand rugby league player
- Carla Hohepa (born 1985), New Zealand rugby union player
- Lani Hohepa, New Zealand gymnast
- Margie Kahukura Hohepa (born 1960), New Zealand academic
- Max Hohepa, New Zealand musician
- Patu Hohepa (1936–2023) New Zealand academic
- Thompson Hohepa, New Zealand musician

== Fictional characters ==
- Elvis Hohepa, a character in New Zealand television comedy series Seven Periods with Mr Gormsby

== Other uses ==
- Hōhepa, opera by New Zealand composer Jenny McLeod
- Hohepa Trust, a New Zealand charitable organisation
  - Hohepa homes, educational facilities for children with learning difficulties, set up by the Hohepa Trust
  - Hohepa Home School, a special education school in Poraiti, New Zealand
- Te Kura o Hato Hohepa Te Kamura, a school in Waitaruke, New Zealand
- Shirley and Grace Hohepa Home, former name of Hackthorne Gardens, Christchurch, New Zealand

== See also ==
- Joe (disambiguation)
- Joseph (disambiguation)
