= Hammerstone =

Prehistoric stone tool

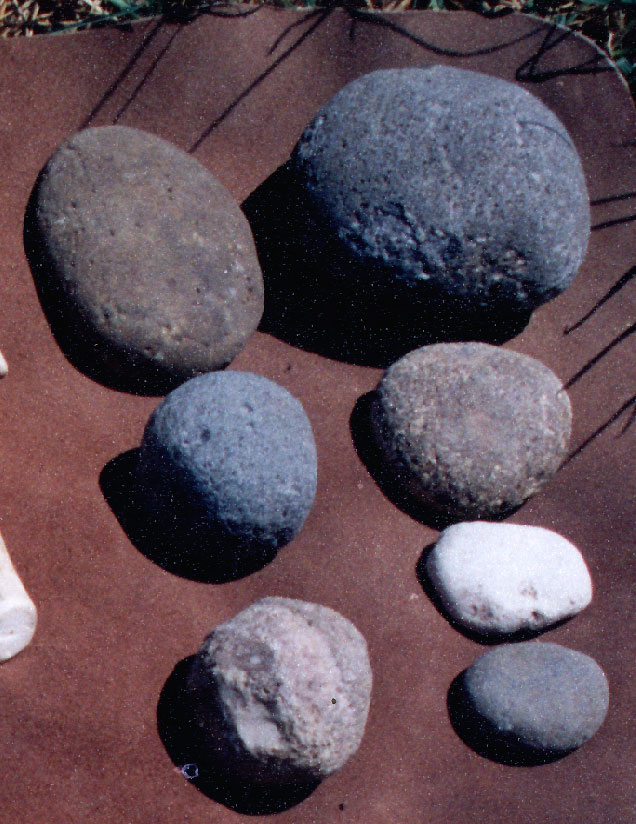
various hammerstones

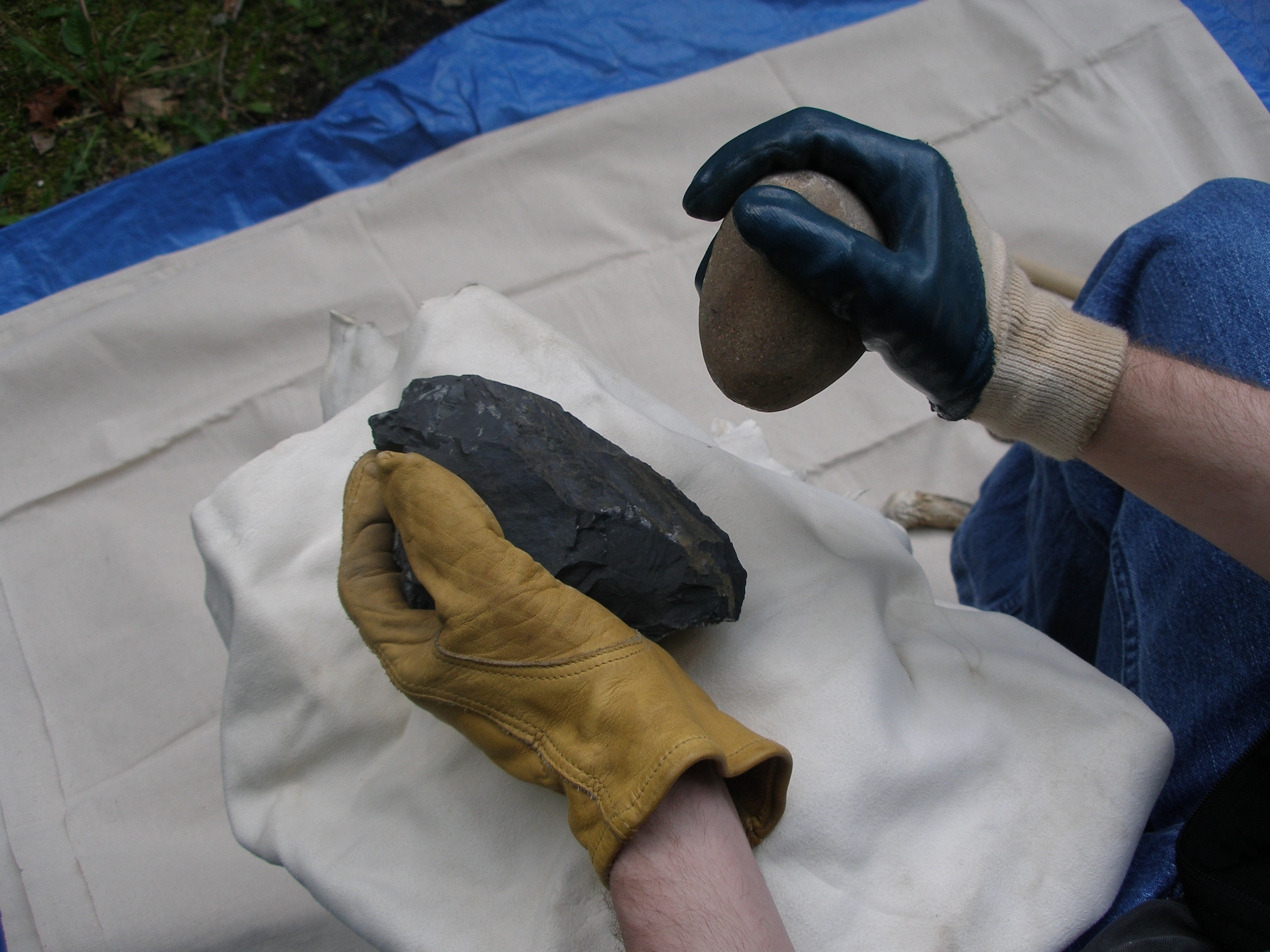
An example of a cobble used as a hammerstone

In archaeology, a hammerstone is a hard cobble used to strike off lithic flakes from a lump of tool stone during the process of lithic reduction. The hammerstone is a rather universal stone tool which appeared early in most regions of the world including Europe, India and North America. This technology was of major importance to prehistoric cultures before the development of metalworking.

== Materials ==
A hammerstone is made of a material such as sandstone, limestone or quartzite, is often ovoid in shape (to fit the human hand better), and develops telltale battering marks on one or both ends. In archaeological recovery, hammerstones are often found in association with other stone tool artifacts, debitage and/or objects of the hammer such as ore. The modern use of hammerstones is now mostly limited to flintknappers and others who wish to develop a better understanding of how stone tools were made.

== Usage ==
Hammerstones are or were used to produce flakes and hand axes as well as more specialist tools from materials such as flint and chert. They were applied to the edges of such stones so that the impact forces caused brittle fractures, and loss of flakes for example. They were also widely used to reduce the bulk of other hard stones such as jade, jadeite and hornstone to make polished stone tools. A good example is the hornstone found in the English Lake District used to make polished axes during the early Neolithic period, and known as the Langdale axe industry.

Hammerstones were used widely in crushing mineral ores such as malachite during the Chalcolithic period, the earliest part of the Bronze Age, and cassiterite prior to smelting of tin. Iron ores would have been crushed to powder in a similar way during the Iron Age. Such crushing was needed to hasten and encourage reduction in the furnaces where charcoal was the main reducing agent.

Other examples of their use include reducing minerals like haematite to powder, for pigment, and crushing of hard nuts, such as hazel nuts, to extract the edible kernels.

== Types of hammerstone ==
Throughout the period of time in which humans have made stone tools (not only during Prehistory), different techniques and different types of hammerstone have been used. The following are the basic types; Certain sophisticated procedures (such as the use of Conchoidal fractures) requires more specialized tools.

=== Direct percussion ===
==== Sleeping (passive) hammer ====
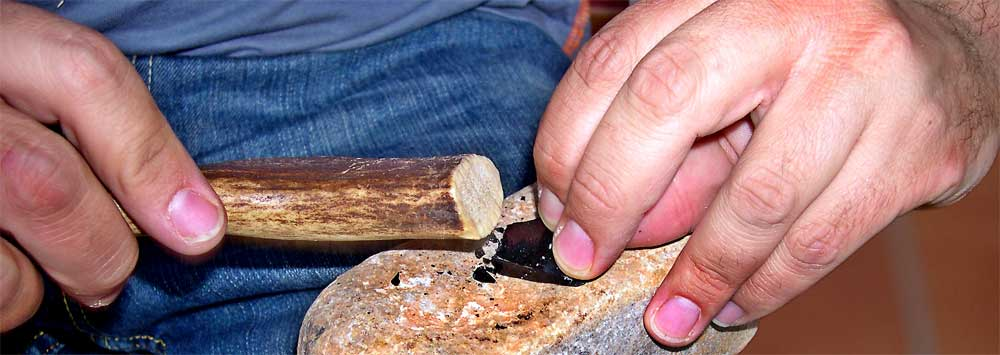
Retouch by direct percussion on a stone anvil.

A large stone set in the ground or firmly mounted. The stone being worked is hit against this anvil, resulting in large flakes that are further processed into tools. This technique is not well known, though there is evidence of it being used during the Lower Paleolithic. The problem with the anvil stone is that the user handles large stones, which can be difficult to control with precision.

Another way of using the sleeping hammer as an anvil is more typical of advanced periods (from the Upper Paleolithic). Although it is based on the use of an anchored stone, the technical concept is completely different: it is about resting stone chips or sheets on the anvil and carrying out an abrupt retouching due to impact on one side (back) or extremity (truncated) thus obtaining retouched orthogonal fractures (this is what is called abrupt retouch). It is also possible to retouch stone tools on the anvil by means of pressure flaking, thus obtaining a regular and monofacial retouched edge.

==== Active hard hammer ====
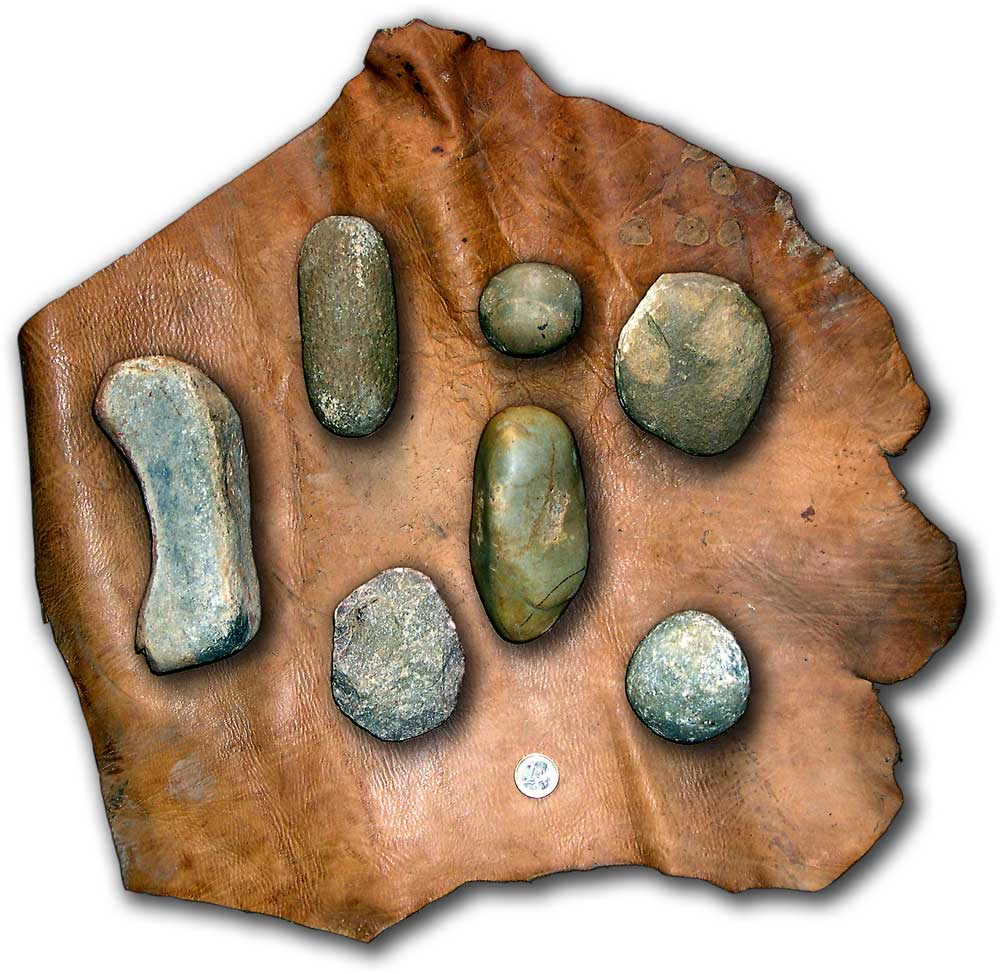
Various types of hard hammer

A simple stone with a worked edge held directly in the hand as a hammer. The hard hammer is and has been the most used throughout human history, because although other types of hammer are used as main tools for carving, stone hammers are the tools that prepared the way for the more advanced techniques. Hard percussion is the first to appear and the only one known for at least two million years (until the soft hammer is incorporated); it was used to manufacture tools throughout the entire operational sequence until lithic technology improved. Then, the hard hammer was relegated to the first stages of making an artifact: the initial roughing, the primary workmanship (the creation of preforms, which would later be refined with a soft or pressure hammer), the attack of percussion planes inaccessible to the soft hammer, the preparation of percussion platforms in certain nuclei, etc.

Despite indirect evidence of its long persistence, archeology has revealed very few hammers. Among the oldest are those cited by Jean and Nicole Chavaillon in both Gomboré 1B, Melka Kunturé and even Olduvai (layers I and II): Active hard hammers are distinguished by their oblong shape with one or two active edges with numerous shock marks and often small flakes (chipping), as well as some cracks. These are recognized by the numerous traces of blows they have (microstars, percussion cones, fissures, random flakes, etc...).

It is possible that in the old and unsystematic excavations they went unnoticed, but it has also been said that the good stone hammers were so appreciated that the craftsman only abandoned them when they were useless. Semenov speaks of a deposit rich in hammering (in Polivanov, Russia), but, like the rest of the sites, they are almost all from the Neolithic period onwards. The size of hard hammers depends on their function: there are very large ones for roughing, medium ones are used for the main work, small ones are auxiliary tools to prepare percussion platforms, or retouch flakes. As for the shape, there are circular, oval, rectangular, etc... In fact, the shape depends a lot on the style of the craftsman (at least for prehistorians who experiment with flint carving who acquire styles, different positions, and tastes).

Despite the fact that stone hammers are more typical of the manufacture of wide and short flakes, used with mastery they can achieve very precise control of rock chipping. In fact, cases of blades manufacture with a hard hammer have been witnessed, mainly in the Middle European Paleolithic (almost always Levallois blades), but also in the Upper and Epipaleolithic. While the extraction of blades is more effective with other techniques, there are enough indications to affirm that it can also be done with a hard hammer. There are even exceptional cases of obsidian blade of more than 30 centimeters manufactured in pre-Columbian Mexico and ancient Ethiopia and greater examples in excess of 70 centimeters found in present-day California. Modern experimental carvers have not been able to recreate these methods.

==== Soft hammer ====
A soft hammer is a fragment of bone, deer antler or hardwood that is used to hit the rock and extract flakes. Soft hammers are usually about 30 or 40 cm long and the ideal size to hold in the hand. The material from which they are made is very varied, since throughout their history humans have hunted many species of deer throughout the globe, but experimental carvers particularly appreciate those of reindeer or caribou (although those of deer are the most common and affordable). The bovine horn is not as suitable as the cervid antler, as it has an external keratin coating separate from the bone core, however they can be used as retouchers. In the case of wood, only especially hard species serve, such as boxwood, holly, and perhaps oak. In any case, the soft hammer wears out with its use relatively quickly. Each blow eats a little from the hammer. Wood hammers wear down especially fast. The antler hammers last a little longer, but in the end they break due to fatigue. Observation with the naked eye reveals that the flint (or whatever the carved rock) leaves small splinters and stone chips embedded in the hammer.

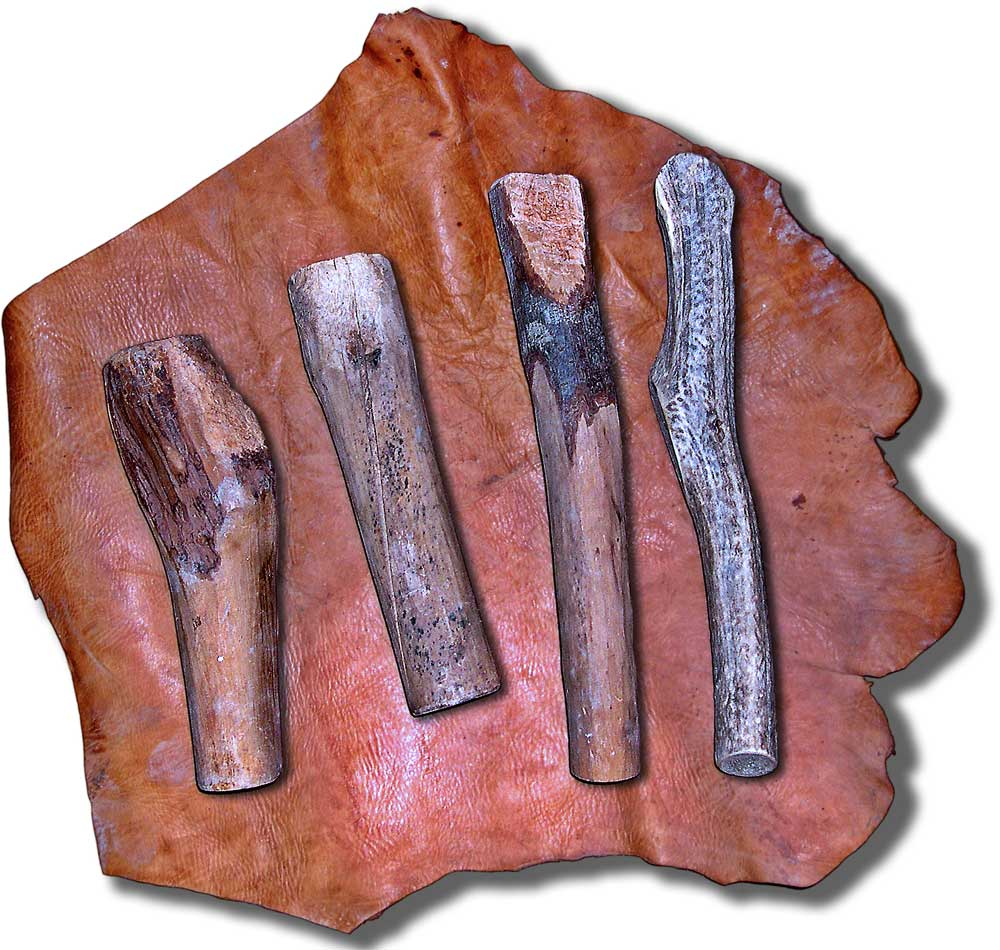
Soft hammers: boxwood, holly, oak and deer antler.

In archaeological excavations, soft hammers are even rarer than hard ones, as they are organic and therefore perishable. François Bordes and Denise de Sonneville-Bordes exhumed one from the most recent Solutrean strata in the Laugerie-Haute cave (Dordogne). The piece was broken into several fragments and incomplete, but retained the functional end, where the marks of the blows could be seen and microscopic embedded flint bits were visible. The petrological analysis additionally determined that it was the same type of flint as the carved pieces extracted from the same archaeological layer.

Despite this brittleness, soft hammers have a series of advantages derived from their elasticity and resistance to stress-deformation. The soft hammer has a lower yield than the rock, that would make a layman think that it is impossible to carve flint or quartzite with a piece of wood or antler. However, its elastic limit is much higher, which makes it bear more tension and it is the rock that breaks, instead of the hammer. This does not happen, however, with the bone. Bone strikers are often unsuitable for carving, in fact bone is more of a carved raw material than rocks.

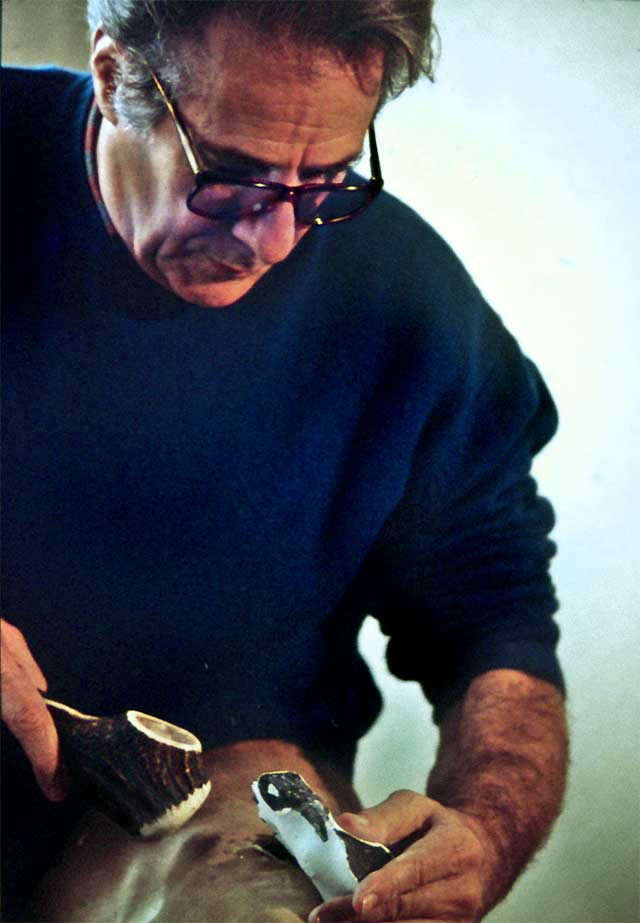
Professor Tixier experimenting with a soft hammer.

During the percussion itself, which lasts thousandths of a second, the soft hammer, being a non-isotropic linear elastic, varies its tension state and increases its internal energy in the form of elastic potential energy. The moment the rock reaches its elastic limit and breaks, the potential energy is released and the hammer returns to its original shape. Also due to its elasticity, the contact surface between hammer and rock is greater, since the hammer adapts to the percussion plane. The percussive area is larger, so the fracture is more diffuse than if one were to use a hard hammer, so the conchoid is also less pronounced. It is a process so fast that it is invisible to the human eye, but its consequences have been exploited for more than a million years. In practice, these elements give the craftsman greater control over carving, in easier-to-direct results, and in more precise and defined varnishing; in short, the carving is more efficient and its results more effective: Artifacts carved with a soft hammer have a much finer finish than those where only the hard hammer has been used.

The soft hammer appeared during the Lower Paleolithic, specifically in the Acheulean (it is very visible in certain bifaces), 700,000 years ago in Africa and half a million years ago in Eurasia. However, the soft hammer does not replace the hard hammer, on the contrary, it complements it. Typically, the roughing or preparation of the piece is done with a hard hammer, and the finish with a soft hammer. Carved objects have scars from both types of hammer. Often the finished and used tools were recycled, re-sharpened, possibly with hard hammer, so there would be several alternate phases of hard and soft hammer. Other times, in the case of the cores, although the extraction of flakes or sheets was done with a soft or pressure hammer (see below), the hard hammer was necessary to prepare the percussion platform and eliminate protrusions that could disrupt the operation.

The carving experiments of Professor Luis Benito del Rey, tenured professor of Prehistory at the University of Salamanca, serve to distinguish, with a certain degree of acceptable precision (since there is never complete certainty), carving scars by direct percussion with a hard hammer. and those of the soft hammer compared to each other.

Direct percussion with a hard hammer	Direct percussion with a soft hammer
Generates thick pieces, with irregular edges and slightly sharp edges (sometimes, with traces of natural rock crust)	Generates thinner and more regular pieces, with much sharper edges
Seen in profile, the edges are sinuous because the negatives of the flakes are marked and quite deep	The edge, seen in profile, is relatively rectilinear or a little wavy, but without marked irregularities
Sometimes, the sinuosities produced by the more marked counter-conchoids can be rectified by a detailing tool or hard hammer; in this way, the profile edge is zigzagging	The counter-conchoids are diffuse and shallow, which does not prevent the edge from being often refined with a much more careful detail that, in fact, reinforces the edge
The marks left by the flakes extracted by means of direct carving with a hard hammer are larger and less numerous	The flakes of the direct soft hammer are longer than they are wide, invasive, shallow, and sometimes less than a millimeter thick
The flakes obtained by this procedure are wider than they are long, and they are narrower in the proximal than in the distal part, with a thick heel (generally flat or dihedral) and a very marked percussion cone and conchoid. The veins that separate the flakes from each other are easy to see.	It is difficult to distinguish the veins that separate the flakes from the soft percussion because their edges are extremely thin and overlap imprecisely. The flakes have edges so fine that they are translucent. Their heel is linear or pointed and sometimes they have a cornice over the conchoid, instead of a percussion cone.
Whether the flakes are a by-product of the carving of a utensil, for example a hand axe, or if they are flakes extracted from a bifacial nucleus, there is no way to distinguish them, so there is no certainty as to whether they are waste (unless trace studies were made).	The flakes of the carving or the retouching of utensils are, almost always, very characteristic by-products (easily identifiable). Those extracted from nuclei prepared for the soft hammer, on the other hand, are specific flakes that would never be confused with carving debris.
When making bifaces (or bifacial pieces) by this technique, its section is polygonal, prismatic, quite irregular and asymmetrical.	The section of a bifacial artifact carved with a soft hammer tends to be lenticular, with very sharp angles.
The marks derived from direct percussion with an active hard hammer are impossible to discern from those obtained with a sleeping or passive hard hammer (experiments show that it is possible to manufacture a biface with a sleeping hammer)	The marks of a soft hammer usually overlap with other previous ones typical of the hard hammer, since it was common to start a piece with a hard hammer until obtaining an outline or preform, and finish it with a soft hammer.
The piece has a heavy, rough, primitive appearance, although such circumstance cannot be taken as a chronological or evolutionary indicator, since there are numerous circumstances that may have influenced it.	The result is an elegant, fairly regular, symmetrical, very well finished and more delicate looking artifact. These elements cannot be considered chronological features either.

The direct soft hammer was used throughout the Upper Paleolithic of Eurasia to obtain blades and flakes, by means of a specific preparation. Prehistoric carvers were able to obtain blades of over half a meter in length. Although the experiments have been able to recreate the methods used, they are still poorly known and the results are often subject to size accidents and fortuitous behavior of the material.

=== Precision and indirect percussion ===
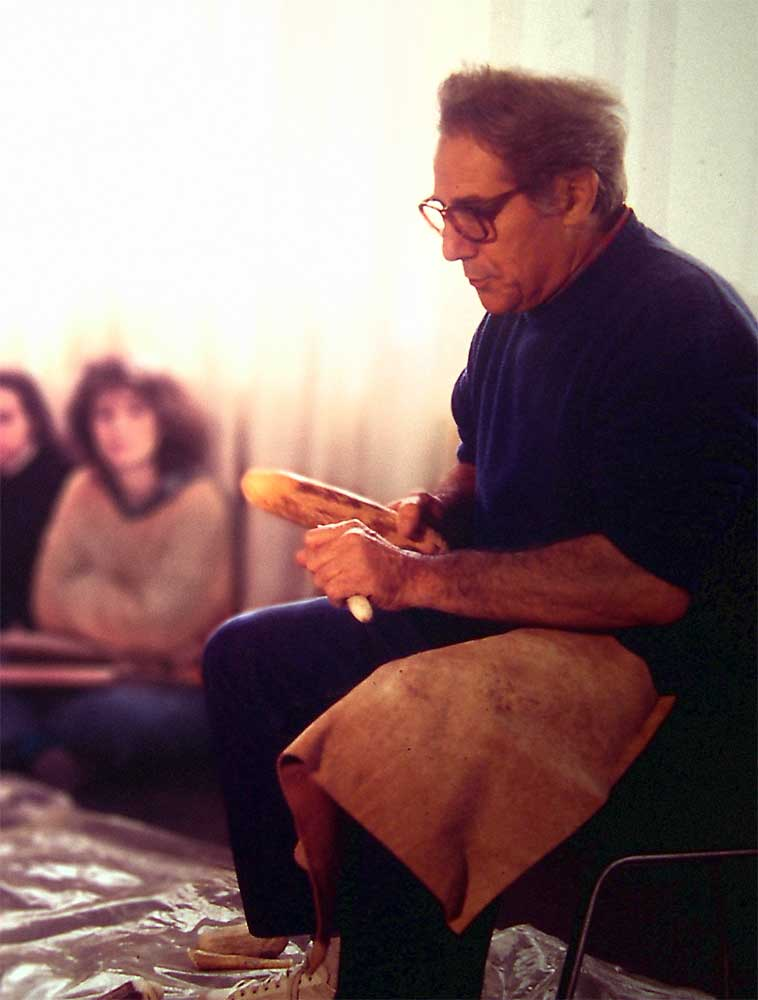
Demonstration of how to place the intermediate piece.

Both percussion with an intermediate piece and pressure carving share common technical points, among them the difficulty of distinguishing the scars left by one and the other. The remaining nuclei of both are, on the other hand, completely different. In the case of pressure, the tool is no longer a hammer in the strict sense of the word, since the compressors, that is, the tools used, do not hit; they only press so hard that they exceed the elastic limit of the rocks, breaking them according to the conchoidal fracture model. For this reason, it is difficult not to associate the compressors with the hammers.

==== Hammer with intermediate piece (pointer) ====
Carving with an intermediate piece is a specialized technique for obtaining lithic blades. It is one of the steps of a laminar extraction method, which means that by itself it has no value, since it requires a previous preparation of the core and continuous maintenance gestures of the same (done this way, the work is very similar to that of a stonemason with his mallet and his chisel). If we consider the core to be ready, there are two known ways to use the pointer or intermediate piece:

- The first is to hold the core between the knees, with the percussion platform up and the extraction face out. The end of the pointer is placed where we want to extract the blade and hit it decisively with a shaft that acts like a mallet. This method yields good products: long, medium-sized and highly standardized blades or sheets, but with a strong general curvature.
- The second is to hold the core underfoot. This results in much straighter blades, but smaller ones. If one tries to increase their size carving accidents are more likely to occur.

It is thought that indirect percussion with a pointer appears in the Upper Palaeolithic, and it coexists with direct percussion. In any case, the scars of these techniques are impossible to distinguish, except in exceptional cases. In fact, it is difficult to identify the bone pointers in the excavations, since they hardly have characteristic marks, that is, different from a percussion with any other purpose. Proposed examples are that of the Fageolet cave (Dordogne), dated in the Gravettian, those of Villevallier and Armeau (Yonne), both Neolithic, and those of Spiennes (Belgium), from the same period.

==== Compressor ====
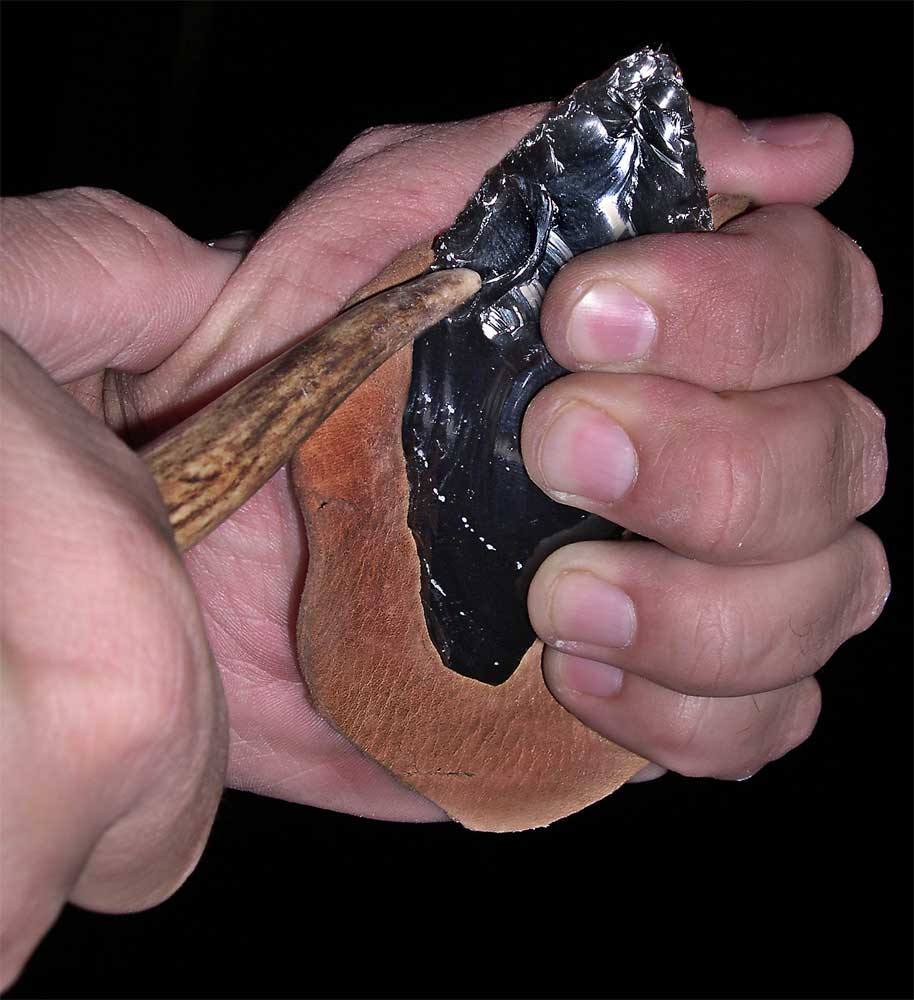
Experimental retouching by pressure with a cervid antler compressor.

Unlike the technique of indirect percussion with a pointer, pressure carving with compressors is not only used for the extraction of flaked products (specifically stone blades), it is also used for retouching tools. In fact, pressure carving to obtain blades includes a vast repertoire of methods, not all of which are known to researchers. All of these methods require a certain level of specialization, as demonstrated by carving experiences. Because of its complexity and the fact that we do not discuss a striker, this section is brief.

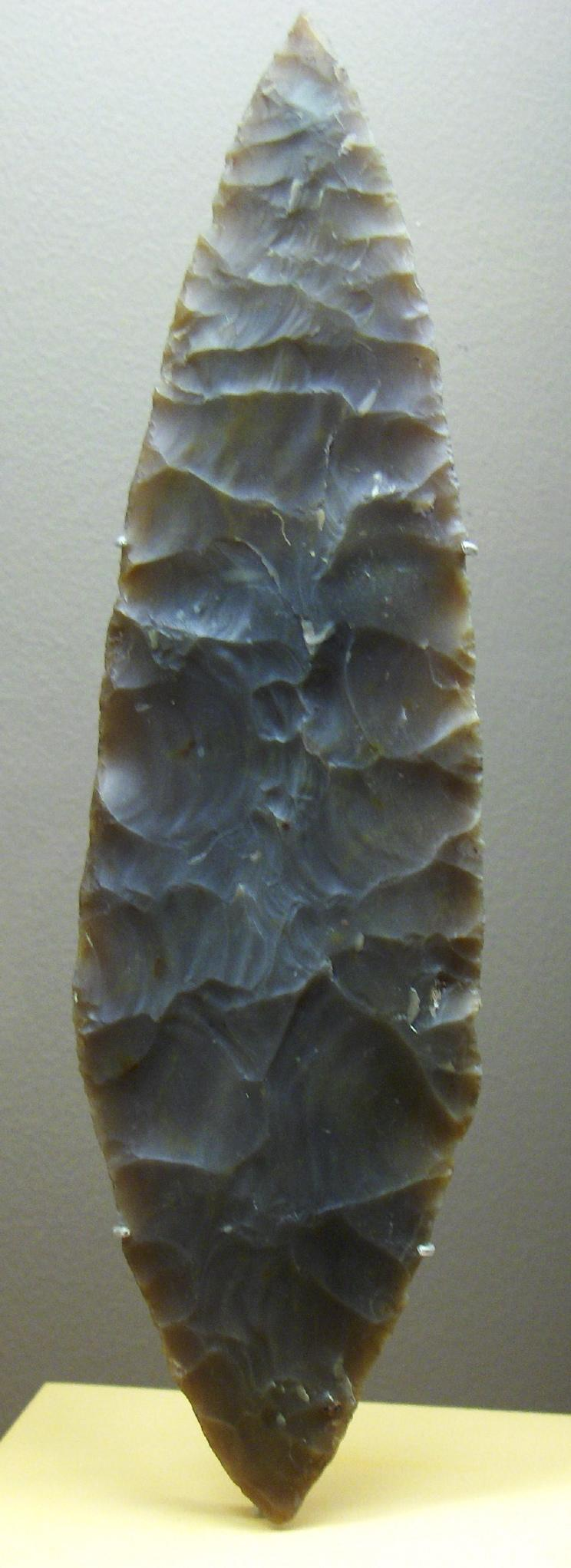
Solutrean laurel leaf blade

There is a method of pressure retouching, called subparallel covering retouching (due to its morphological aspect), which was rediscovered by the American archaeologist and experimenter Donald E. Crabtree in the 70s, and expanded by this same archaeologist with the collaboration of Butler, Tixier and others. They have also developed many others, but this type of retouching is quite well known (In fact, many enthusiasts manufacture and sell highly accurate replicas in memory of the Native American heritage of certain regions) and the interest from researchers, experimental prehistorians, has gone to the extraction of blades by pressure. To carry out this technique, the piece must be held firmly on the palm of the left hand (holding the lithic artifact firmly is one of the most difficult techniques to learn). The compressor is held with the right or it is levered while holding the left hand between the thumb and the rest of the fingers, pressing as hard as possible. The compressor can be made of horn or ivory (sometimes with a flint embedded in the tip), but in Chalcolithic, which must be considered the golden age of this type of retouching due to the masterpieces obtained, the compressor could have a copper tip. If the technique is done well, the touches are usually very regular, parallel, and very flat over all.

On the other hand, if there is a Silver Age of pressure retouching, it must be the Solutrean, in the Upper Paleolithic (the most emblematic case being that of the Laurel blades); Although the technique was known before, it was hardly used. It disappeared for a time and reappeared in the Neolithic, lasting for a long time in foliaceous pieces of various sizes (from the tip of a stone arrow, to the Aztec ceremonial daggers, through the tips of the Clovis Culture or knives Egyptian Predynastics).

There are many techniques for pressure knapping, too many to describe in detail aside from a basic list:

- Extraction of blades in hand with the help of a simple cervid horn compressor: If the flint is of good quality, blades of up to four cm in length and 7 mm in width are obtained, but the difficulty of holding the core firmly increases as the extraction progresses and the core becomes smaller, so carving accidents often occur.
- Extraction of blades with a compressor and with a core fixation system in hand (a piece with a slot where the core is placed and which can be made of wood, bone or horn): The results are not significantly better, but they are more homogeneous, avoiding most carving accidents.
- Extraction of blades with a system of fixation of the nucleus at hand and the help of a cane-compressor supported in the armpit: a method already experimented by Crabtree, allows to increase the force with which the nucleus is pressed, thus obtaining slightly larger blades and minimizing carving accidents.
- Extraction of blades holding the nucleus in the ground by means of wooden fixing mechanisms and using walking sticks (crutches) resting on the chest or abdomen. The worker's posture can be standing (using weight to press) or sitting (less strength, but more control). The blades obtained approach fifteen centimeters long. In addition, they are more standardized, more homogeneous, and the nucleus can be exploited much more until it is completely exhausted.
- Extraction of blades holding the nucleus in the ground by means of wooden fixing mechanisms and using walking sticks (crutches) supported on the abdomen. The position of the standing craftsperson allows the weight to be used to press; but the real trick is a recess in the cane, so that it can bend, making it more flexible. That is, adding to the weight of the body the potential energy of the warped cane.
- Extraction of leaves holding the nucleus in the ground by means of wooden fixing mechanisms and using stick-compressors with a lever resting on the abdomen. The craftsperson's posture is sitting and grasping the cane at the opposite end, pulling it up. Thus, the lever attacks the core with a force greater than 300 kg. With this system, still under investigation, blades of more than 25 centimeters have been obtained.

Extraction of blades by pressure has the advantage, over indirect percussion with pointer, of producing much more rectilinear pieces, as was the case with the other method.

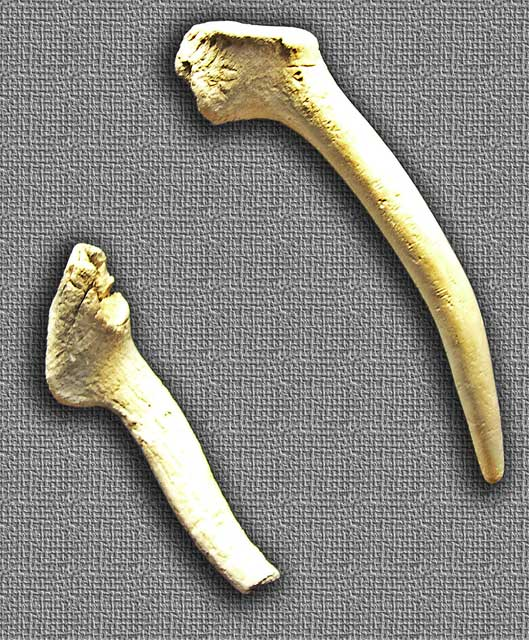
Deer horn retouchers from the Los Cercados site, in Mucientes, Valladolid.

The extraction of leaves began, from the end of the Paleolithic, to be an increasingly complex and sophisticated method in which, as we see, the strikers are only one of the instruments used. As the extraction of blades was perfected, accessories were added: first the intermediate piece or pointer for indirect carving, then the abrasive pebbles to prepare percussion platforms, then the compressors with handles, later the core fixing systems (the former were used to hold them in the hand, then the feet, and finally autonomous, but increasingly complex), the latter attached to the crutches or walking sticks (at first they rested on the shoulder, then on the abdomen and finally on the chest), to which was added a bone, antler or copper tip, a lever mechanism and a recess to increase its elasticity and potential energy. All this points to an increasingly specialized industry, probably focused on trade; at least since the Chalcolithic. There may have been specialized workshops that supplied more or less wide areas from the source of origin of the raw material. A good example of the latter are the very long flint blades from Varna (Bulgaria), which could reach 44 centimeters in length, were made of imported flint and only appeared in the richest tombs dated to the 4th millennium BC.

The opposite case is that of the Valladolid reservoir of Los Cercados (municipality of Mucientes). There, a series of Copper Age finds appeared, basically wells filled with archaeological remains. One of them produced a series of utensils typical of an artisan, specialized in the carving of indigenous flint: carving waste, roughing products, flakes, discarded tools, and above all stone hammers and what have been called bone retouchers (this type of pieces are rarely preserved, that's why they are so important). Apparently in this site they specialized in foliaceous pieces, for example arrowheads, and sickle teeth; that is, it was a regional production destined for domestic use.

=== Modern metallic hammerstones ===
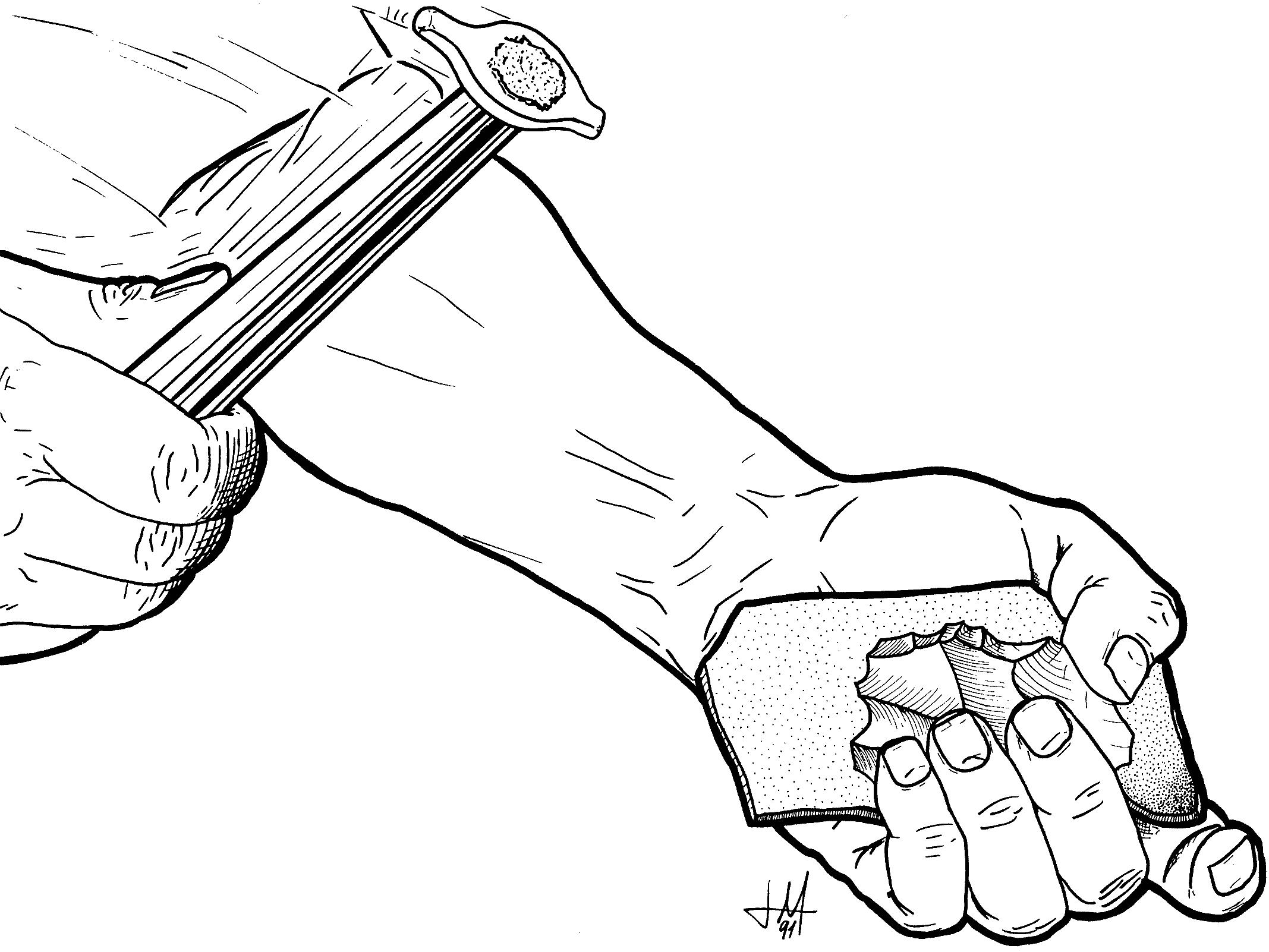
Flint carving in the prehistoric way with modern metal hammer.

Stone carving, as is known, is one of the human forms of artistic manifestation and is used both in sculpture and in architecture. Currently, flint and other conchoidal fracture rocks are used as construction materials, either as ashlars or as an aesthetic coating. However, this phenomenon does not concern this article. On the other hand, the carving of flint or other rocks, in the prehistoric way, has persisted for use on agricultural instruments (sickles, threshing ...), spark stones (tinder lighters, flint firearms ...) and even manufacturers of semi-precious gemstones in India and other countries. The difference is usually that hammers with modern metal alloys are used.

==== England ====
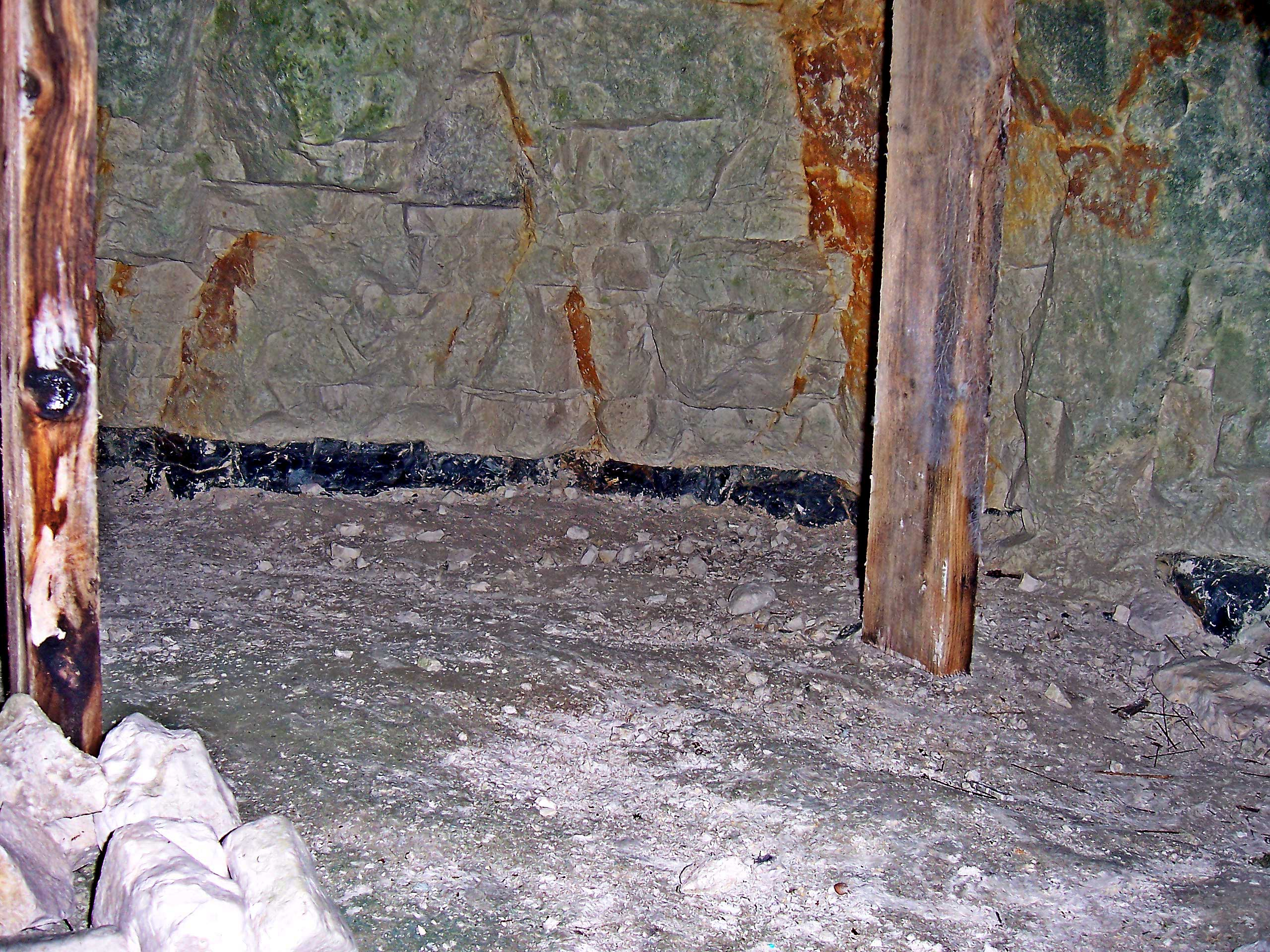
Grimes Graves: Neolithic Flint Mines in Brandon, England.

To the north of the English region of Suffolk, there is a rich tradition of flint carving centered around the town of Brandon where prehistoric, probably Neolithic, flint mines called Grimes Graves are preserved. Apparently, from the historical origins of the town in the 14th century, flint was used as a construction material (including the bridge over the river that gave it strategic relevance). After the appearance of gunpowder, many of the Brandon's artisans dedicated themselves to making spark stones for firearms. Although advances in military technology ended this activity in the middle of the 20th century, there are still some master carvers who use various metal hammers.

==== Spain ====
Until a few decades ago, in Spanish towns such as Cantalejo (Segovia), flint was carved for the manufacture of agricultural threshing machines. The flint carving technique was very simple and standardized, aimed at obtaining wide and short but resistant chips of about three centimeters. For this, different hammers were used. The hammer used in the final phase, that of the flake itself, was a long and narrow-handled wooden peg, with a small, almost tiny, metal head with two thin and prominent ends. The metal mass of this type of hammer is very small compared to its long and flexible handle, which, in addition to increasing the speed of the blow, combines the potential energy of the wooden handle with the hardness of the small metal pick. Thus, a direct hard percussion is obtained, with a soft, elastic impact.

==== India ====
In the Gujarat region (India) there are still artisans who make thick chalcedony necklace beads by knapping. This activity is concentrated in the city of Cambay (or Khambhat) and has certain peculiarities; It uses the kickback technique between a pointed metal passive hammer and an active water buffalo horn hammer. The craftsmen shape the beads, holding them against the metal hammer and hitting them with the horn, causing little pieces to fly off little by little. The result is a very efficient method. Although the technique persists today, it is suspected that it must have appeared in very ancient times, perhaps with the first brass instruments, in the Chalcolithic.

== See also ==
- Chopper
- Lithic technology
- Stone Age
- Whetstone
