= Juuso =

Juuso is a given name and a surname, which was derived from the Biblical name of Joseph. Juuso's name day is March 19. Notable people with the name include:

== Persons with the given name ==
- Juuso Akkanen (born 1983), Finnish ice hockey player
- Juuso Antonen (born 1988), Finnish ice hockey player
- Juuso Hietanen (born 1985), Finnish ice hockey defenceman
- Juuso Honka (born 1990), Finnish ice hockey player
- Juuso Ikonen (born 1995), Finnish ice hockey player
- Juuso Kaijomaa (born 1989), Finnish ice hockey player
- Juuso Kangaskorpi (born 1975), Finnish football defender and manager
- Juuso Ngaikukwete (c. 1873—1955), Namibian pastor
- Juuso Pulli (born 1991), Finnish ice hockey defenceman
- Juuso Puustinen (born 1988), Finnish ice hockey player
- Juuso Pykälistö (born 1975), Finnish rally driver
- Juuso Rajala (born 1988), Finnish ice hockey player
- Juuso Ramo (born 1994), Finnish ice hockey player
- Juuso Riikola (born 1993), Finnish ice hockey player
- Juuso Riksman (born 1977), Finnish ice hockey goaltender
- Juuso Salmi (born 1991), Finnish ice hockey defenceman
- Juuso Simpanen (born 1991), Finnish footballer
- Juuso Vainio (born 1994), Finnish ice hockey player
- Juuso Walden (1907–1972), Finnish industrial entrepreneur

== Persons with the surname ==
- Anni-Kristiina Juuso (born 1979), Finnish actress
- Inga Juuso (1945–2014), Norwegian yoik singer and actress
- Kaisa Juuso (born 1960), Finnish politician
- Per Isak Juuso (born 1953), Sámi duojare and artist, Sweden
