= Jazep =

Jazep (Belarusian: Язэп) is a Belarusian masculine given name. Notable people with this name include:

- Jazep Drazdovič (1888–1954), Belarusian painter
- Jazep Hermanovich (1890–1978), Belarusian priest and poet
- Jazep Jucho (1921–2004), Belarusian lawyer, historian, and writer
- Jazep Losik (1884–1940), Belarusian academic
- Jazep Mamońka (1889–1937), Belarusian politician
- Jazep Pušča (1902–1964), Belarusian poet, writer, critic, and translator
- Jazep Sažyč (1917–2007), Belarusian politician and military commander
- Jazep Varonka (1891–1952), Belarusian politician

== See also ==
- Jāzeps, a Latvian masculine given name
