= Increase =

Increase may refer to:

- Increase (given name)
- Increase (knitting), the creation of one or more new stitches
- Increase, Mississippi, a former name of a community

== See also ==
- Decline (disambiguation)
