= Youssoupha Ndiaye =

Youssoupha Ndiaye may refer to:

- Youssoupha Ndiaye (politician) (1938–2021), Senegalese politician
- Youssoupha N'Diaye (footballer) (born 1997), Senegalese footballer

== See also ==
- Youssouf N'Diaye (born 1995), French footballer
