= Yosifov =

Yosifov is a Bulgarian surname, and is a variation of Yosif, a Slavicised version of Yosef. Notable people with the surname include:

- Viktor Yosifov (born 1985), Bulgarian volleyball player
- Yordan Yosifov (1932–2014), Bulgarian footballer
