= Joosep =

Male given name

- Gender: Male
- Language: Estonian
- Name day: 19 March

Origin
- Region of origin: Estonia

Joosep is an Estonian masculine given name, a version of Joseph.

People named Joosep include:

- Joosep Matjus (born 1984), Estonian documentary filmmaker
- Joosep Saat (1900–1977), Estonian communist politician, journalist and academic
- Joosep Toome (born 1985), Estonian basketball player
- Joosep Vau (born 1989), birth name of PK (musician), Estonian alternative new school hip-hop and Emo rap artist
- Mihkel Joosep (born 1957), Estonian cyclist

Fictional characters

- Joosep Toots, one of the main character from Oskar Luts's novels Kevade, Suvi and Sügis and their film adaptions (Spring).
- Joosep Rääk, the main character of the 2007 Estonian movie about school violence The Class, directed by Ilmar Raag
