= Joseph =

Given name

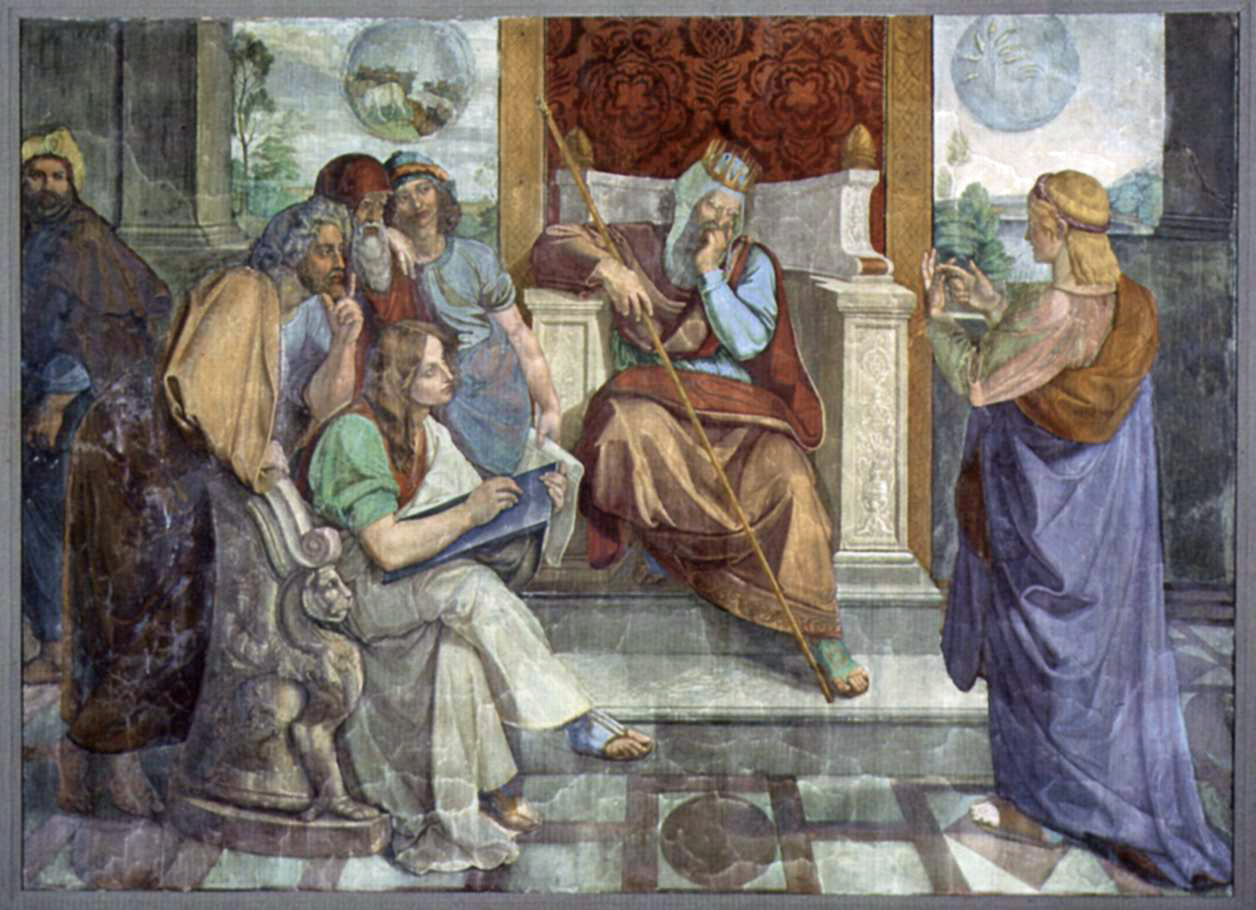
- Joseph, a figure in the Book of Genesis
- Pronunciation: /ˈdʒoʊzɪf, -sɪf/
- Gender: Male
- Name day: 19 March

Origin
- Origin: Hebrew
- Meaning: YHWH shall add, God will add, taken away or praise, fame taken away
- Region of origin: Middle East

Other names
- Related names: Joe, Joey, Joel, Jojo, Jos, Joss, Josh, John, Jose, Josephus, José, Joseba, Jože, Jāzeps, Dodô, Doido, Joep, Jupp, Posie, Bapi, Jô, Giuseppe, Yosef, Yoseph, Ouseph, Iosif, Peppa, Hovsep, Yusuf, Seph, Sepp, Jo, Josie, Josip, Josif, Josef, József, Pepa, Josephine, Josephina, Increase, Juuso, Joshua, Ġużepp, Ġużè, Xosé, Żepp, Żeppi

Joseph is a common male name, derived from the Hebrew Yosef (יוֹסֵף). "Joseph" is used, along with "Josef", mostly in English, French and partially German languages. This spelling is also found as a variant in the languages of the modern-day Nordic countries. In Portuguese and Spanish, the name is "José". In Catalan it is "Josep". In Arabic, including in the Quran, the name is spelled يوسف, Yūsuf. In Kurdish (Kurdî), the name is Ûsiv or Yûsiv, Persian, the name is Yousef, and in Turkish it is Yusuf. In Pashto the name is spelled Esaf (ايسپ) and in Malayalam it is spelled Ousep (ഔസേപ്പ്). In Tamil, it is spelled as Yosepu (யோசேப்பு).

The name has enjoyed significant popularity in its many forms in numerous countries, and Joseph was one of the two names (along with Robert) to have remained in the top 10 boys' names list in the US from 1925 to 1972. It is especially common in contemporary Israel, as either "Yossi" or "Yossef", and in Italy, where the name "Giuseppe" was the most common male name in the 20th century. In the first century CE, Yosef was the second most popular male name for Jews.

In the Book of Genesis Joseph is Jacob's eleventh son and Rachel's first son, and known in the Hebrew Bible as Yossef ben-Yaakov. In the New Testament the most notable two are Joseph of Nazareth, the husband of Mary, the mother of Jesus and Joseph of Arimathea, a secret disciple of Jesus Christ who supplied the tomb in which Jesus was buried.

== Etymology ==
The Bible offers two explanations for the origins of the name Yosef: first, it is compared to the word asaf from the root /'sp/, 'taken away': "And she conceived, and bore a son; and said, God hath taken away my reproach"; Yosef is then identified with the similar root /ysp/, meaning 'add': "And she called his name Joseph; and said, The LORD shall add to me another son." The Jewish Encyclopedia says that it is a theophoric name referencing the Tetragrammaton, and in fact his name is spelled Jehoseph, with the theophoric first syllable 'Jeho', once in Psalms. The name can also consist of the Hebrew yadah meaning "praise", "fame" and the word asaf.

== Variants, diminutives and familiar forms in other languages ==
Variations for males include:

- Afrikaans: Josef, Joesoef
- Albanian: Jozef, Zef, Josif, Jozë, Isuf, Bep, Bibë
- Acehnese: Yusuf
- Acholi: Yucepu, Yucef
- Alemmanic: Sepp, Seppu
- Alsatian: Sepp
- Amharic: ዮሴፍ (Yosēfi)
- Aragonese: Chusep, Chusé
- Aramaic: ܝܰܘܣܶܦ (Yawsef, Yowsef)
- Armenian: Հովսեփ, Յովսէփ (Hovsep, Yovsep’)
- Arabic: يوسف (Yūsif, Youssef, Yussef, Yousif, Yousef, Youssof, Yūsuf, Yusef)
- Arpitan: Dzozè
- Asturian: Xosé
- Azerbaijani: Yusif, Yusuf, Usub
- Balinese: Yusup
- Bambara: Yusufu
- Basque: Joseba, Josepe
- Baoulé: Zozɛfu
- Bavarian: Sepp, Bepperl, Beppe, Beppi,
- Belarusian: Іосіф (Iosif), Язэп (Jazep)
- Bengali: ইউসুফ (Iusuf)
- Betawi: Yusuf, Yusup, Ucup.
- Bosnian: Josip, Jusuf
- Breton: Jozef, Jozeb
- Bulgarian: Йосиф (Yosif)
- Burmese (Myanmar): ယောသပ် (Yaw sautsai)
- Cantonese: 約瑟 (Joek^{3} sat^{1})
- Catalan: Josep, Pep (shortened form), Jep (an alternative shortened form)
- Chechen: Иосиф, Юсуп (Iosif, Yusup)
- Chuvash: Иосиф, Джозеф (Iosif, Džozef)
- Circassian: Юсыф (Yusyf)
- Cornish: Josep
- Corsican: Ghjaseppu, Ghjiseppu; Diminutives: Ghjasè, Ghjisè, Sipparellu, Sgiusgiunellu
- Croatian: Josip, Joso, Jozo, Joza, Joze, Joško, Joža, Jože, Bepo, Bepi, Bapi, Pino, Osíp, Bozo, Gonzo, Ganso
- Czech: Josef; Diminutives: Pepa, Peppa, Pepík, Pepik, Jožka, Pepan, Pepča, Pepek, Pepino, Jožin
- Danish: Josef
- Dutch: Jozef, Josephus; Diminutives: Joep, Joost, Jos, Jo, Jef, Seppe
- English: Joseph, Diminutives: Jo, Joe, Joey, Josy, Jossy, Josey, Jos, Josie
- Estonian: Joosep, Joosu
- Faroese: Jósef
- Fijian: Josefa
- Filipino: Joseph, José, Pepe, Peping, Sep, Jojo
- Finnish: Jooseppi, Juuso
- French: José, Joseph, Jojo
- Friulian: Josef, 'Sef, 'Sefin, 'Sefut, Bepi, Bepo, Beput
- Galician: Xosé
- Georgian: იოსებ (Ioseb), სოსო (Soso)
- German: Joscha, Josef, Joseph; Jupp (familiar); Sepp, Seppl or Pepi (familiar or diminutive forms, particularly in South Germany and Austria)
- Greek: Ιωσήφ (Iosif), Ιώσηπος (Iosipos), Σήφης (Sifis) (local in Crete)
- Gujarati: જોસેફ (Jōsēfa)
- Hausa: Yusufu
- Hawaiian: Iokepa
- Hebrew: יוסף (Yosef), יוסי (Yossi) (diminutive), ספי (Sefi) (diminutive)
- Hiligaynon: José, Josef, Josep (rare)
- Hindi: यूसुफ़ (Yūsuf)
- Hungarian: József, Jóska, Józsi (diminutive)
- Icelandic: Jósef, Jói
- Igbo: Yôsēp̄, Yossef, Josef
- Indonesian: Joesoef, Josef, Joseph, Jusuf, Ucup, Yosef, Yosep, Yusuf, Yusup, Yoseph, Yosi
- Italian: Giuseppe, Giù, Beppe, Peppe, Peppino, Pepino, Pino, Bepi, Beppo, Pippo, Puccio, Gioseffo, Gio or Giò
- Irish: Seosamh, Iósaf
- Japanese: ヨセフ (Yosefu), ジョセフ (Josefu)
- Javanese: Yusuf
- Kambaata: Yeseffe, Yese, Josse, Jossy
- Kannada: ಜೋಸೆಫ್ (Jōseph)
- Kashmiri: یوٗسف (Yūsuf)
- Kazakh: Yusuf, Jusip
- Khmer: យ៉ូសែប (Yousaep)
- Korean: 요셉 (Yosep), 조셉 (Josep)
- Kurdish (Kurdî): Ûsiv, Yûsiv, Yûsif
- Kyrgyz: Жусуп (Jusup), Юс
- Latin: Iosephus
- Latvian: Jāzeps, Jozefs, Josefs, Josifs, Džozefs, Žozefs, Jusufs, Jozis, Zeps, Seps
- Limburgish: Joep, Sef
- Lithuanian: Juozapas, Juozas (shorter form), Juzas, Juzė (diminutive), Justas
- Lombard: Usèp, Jusèp, Bèp
- Luganda: Yusufu, Yozefu
- Macedonian: Јосиф (J̌osif)
- Malayalam: ജോസപ്പ് (Josapp) or ജോസപ്പൻ (Josappan), ഔസേപ്പ് (Ousepp), യോസേപ്പ് (Yosepp), കൊച്ചാപ്പു (Kochaappu), ഈപ്പൻ (Eeppan), ജോസഫ് (Jōsaph), ഐപ്പ് (Iype)
- Malaysian: Yusuf, Yusop, Yusoff, Jusoh, Eusoff, Usop
- Manado Malay: Josef, Yosef, Oce'
- Maltese: Ġużeppi, Ġużi, Ġuż, Ġużè, Peppi, Peppu, Peppinu, Pepp, Peppa, Pepa, Żeppi, Żeppu, Żepp
- Mandarin: simplified Chinese: 约瑟; traditional Chinese: 約瑟; pinyin: (Yuēsè), simplified Chinese: 约瑟夫; traditional Chinese: 約瑟夫; pinyin: (Yuēsèfū), Chinese: 玉素甫; pinyin: Yùsùfǔ, Zho-Zi-Fu
- Marathi: योसेफ (Jōsēfa)
- Māori: Hohepa
- Mongolian: Иосеф (Iosyef)
- Montenegrin: Josif, Džozef,
- Nepali: यूसुफ (Yūsupha)
- Norwegian: Josef
- Occitan: Josèp
- Oriya: ଯୋସେଫ (Yōsēpha)
- Persian: يوسف (Youssef, Yūsuf, Yussef)
- Polish: Józef, Józek (diminutive), Józio (diminutive)
- Portuguese: José, Josefo, Joséf; diminutive forms: Zé, Zeca, Zezé
- Provençal: Jóusè
- Punjabi: ਯੂਸੁਫ਼ (Yūsufa)
- Quechua: Husiy
- Romanian: Iosif, Iosub
- Rromni: Jozef
- Romansch: Giusep, Gisep, Giusi, Sepp
- Russian: Иосиф (Iosif), Осип (Osip), Пеппа (Peppa)
- Samoan: Iosefa, Sefa
- Sardinian: Josepe, Zosepe, Gisepu
- Scottish Gaelic: Seòsaidh, Eòsaph, Iòsaph
- Serbian: Јосиф (Josif), Јосип (Josip), Јосеф (Josef), Јозеф (Jozef)
- Sepedi: Josefa
- Sicilian: Giuseppi
- Silesian: Zefel, Zeflik (diminutive)
- Sinhala: ජුසේ (Juse), ජෝසේෆ් (Jōsēf)
- Slovak: Jozef, Jožo, Dodo, Ďoďo
- Slovene: Jožef, Jože
- Somali: Yuusuf
- Spanish: José; hypocoristic versions: Pepe, Chepe, Che, Cheo, Chelo
- Sundanese: Ucup, Yusup, Yosep
- Swahili: Yusuph, Yusufu, Yosefu
- Swedish: Josef
- Syriac: ܝܘܣܦ (Yosip, Yausef, Osi)
- Tagalog: Jose, Pepe, Peping
- Tamil: சூசை (sūsai), யோசேப்பு (yōcēppu)
- Tajik: Юсуф (Yusuf)
- Telugu: యోసేపు (Yōsepu)
- Thai: โจเซฟ (Co sef, Josef)
- Tigrinya: ዮሴፍ (Yosēf)
- Tongan: Siosefa
- Turkish: Yusuf
- Turkmen: Yusup
- Tyap: Isuu
- Ukrainian: Йосип (Josyp), Осип (Osyp)
- Urdu: يوسف (Yūsuf)
- Uyghur: يۈسۈپ (Yüsüp/Йүсүп)
- Uzbek: Yusuf
- Valencian: Josep
- Venetian: Juxepe, Bepi, Bepin, Bapi
- Vietnamese: Giu-se or Giô-xếp or Yuse or Giô-sép
- Vilamovian: Juza
- Welsh: Joseff, Ioseff (or, less commonly, Iosep)
- Yiddish: Yissl, Yussel, Jayzl
- Yoruba: Josefu, Yusufu
- Shona: Joze, Joza
- Zulu: uJosef

=== Female forms ===
- Albanian: Jozefina, Zefina
- Catalan: Josepa, Pepa, Peppa (shortened)
- Cornish: Josepa
- Croatian: Josipa, Josica, Jozica
- Czech: Josefina, Josefa, Jozeva
- Dutch: José, Josefien
- English: Jo, Josephine, Joette, Posy, Posie
- French: Joséphine, Josephte, Josepthe
- Friulian: Josefe, 'Sefe, Pine
- Greek: Ιωσηφίνα (Iosiphina)
- Hungarian: Jozefa, Jozefina, Józsa
- Indonesian: Yosephine, Josefa, Josepha, Josephira, Josephine, Josephina, Yosefin, Yosefina, Josefina, Yosepha
- Irish: Seosaimhín
- Italian: Giuseppa, Giuseppina
- Maltese: Ġuża, Ġużeppa
- Norwegian: Josefine, Josephine
- Polish: Józefina, Józefa, Józia (shortened)
- Portuguese: Josefa, Josefina, José (mainly in the compound Maria José), Zezé (nickname)
- Romansh: Giuseppa, Giuseppina
- Samoan: Iosefina
- Sardinian: Josepa, Zosepa, Zosepedda
- Slovak: Jozefína, Jozefa
- Spanish: Josefa, Josefina, Josefita
- Swedish: Josefin, Josefine, Josephine, Josefina
- Yiddish: Jayzl, Yissl

== See also ==
- Hohepa (disambiguation)
- Increase (given name)
- Joe (disambiguation)
- Josef (disambiguation)
- Jozef
- József
- Saint Joseph (disambiguation)
- Patriarch Joseph (disambiguation)
- Yosef (disambiguation), a variation of the name in Hebrew, and the Dutch eye dialect of the name
- Yusuf (disambiguation), as rendered in Islam/Arabic
- Boleslav and Václav, often treated as Slavic translations of Joseph due to their similar meanings.
