= Yusuf (disambiguation) =

Yusuf is a male given name.

Yusuf may also refer to:

- Yusuf (surah), 12th sura of the Quran
- Yusuf, stage name of singer-songwriter Cat Stevens
- Yoosuf, 2008 Maldivian film

== See also ==
- Joseph in Islam
- Yusuf and Zulaikha, poetry about Joseph and the wife of Potiphar
- Yousaf (disambiguation)
