= Jože =

Jože is a Slovenian male given name related to Joseph. Notable people with this name include:

- Jože Babič (1917–1996), Slovenian film, theatre and television director
- Jože Benko (born 1980), Slovenian football striker
- Jože Berc (born 1944), Slovenian rower
- Jože Bertoncelj (1922–2012), Slovenian alpine skier
- Jože Brilej (1910–1981), diplomat, politician, ambassador, colonel
- Jože Brodnik (born 1936), Slovenian decathlete
- Jože Ciuha (1924–2015), Slovenian painter
- Jože Dežman (born 1955), Slovenian historian
- Jože Flere (born 1968), Paralympian athlete from Slovenia
- Jože Gazvoda (born 1949), Slovenian alpine skier
- Jože Gerkman, Yugoslav slalom canoeist
- Jože Humer (1936–2012), Slovenian musician
- Jože Ilija (1928–1983), Slovenian slalom canoeist
- Jože Javoršek (1920–1990), Slovenian author
- Jože Klemenčič (born 1962), Slovenian cross-country skier
- Jože Knific (born 1915), Slovenian cross-country skier
- Jože Kolman (born 1967), Slovenian gymnast
- Jože Kovač (born 1961), Yugoslavian athlete
- Jože Kuralt (1956–1986), alpine skier
- Jože Mehle (born 1980), Slovenian cross-country skier
- Jože Melaher, Yugoslav military officer
- Jože Mencinger (born 1941), Slovenian politician
- Jože Međimurec (born 1945), Slovenian middle-distance runner
- Jože Možina (born 1968), Slovenian historian, sociologist and journalist
- Jože Pahor (1888–1964), Slovene writer, playwright, editor and journalist
- Jože Pirjevec (born 1940), Slovene-Italian historian
- Jože Plečnik (1872–1957), Slovene architect
- Jože Pogačnik (1932–2016), Slovenian film director and screenwriter
- Jože Poklukar (born 1973), Slovenian biathlete
- Jože Prelogar (born 1959), Slovenian football player and manager
- Jože Privšek (1937–1998), musician
- Jože Pučnik (1932–2003), Slovenian politician
- Jože Smole (born 1965), Yugoslav cyclist
- Jože Snoj (born 1934), Slovenian author
- Jože Toporišič (1926–2014), Slovene linguist
- Jože Vadnov (born 1912), Slovenian gymnast
- Jože Valenčič (born 1948), Yugoslav cyclist
- Jože Vidmar (born 1963), Slovenian slalom canoeist
- Jože Vrtačič (born 1980), Slovenian sprinter
- Jože Zidar (1927–2012), Slovenian ski jumper
- Jože Šlibar (born 1934), Yugoslav ski jumper
- Jože Šmit (1922–2004), Slovene poet, translator, editor and journalist
