= Yousaf =

Yousaf is an alternative name of Joseph in Islam. (Note: For a Muslim view of Joseph, see Joseph in Islam.)

Yousaf is also a given name and surname and an alternative of Joseph, Yousef, Yusuf, Yousuf and variants. People with the name include:

== Given name ==
- Yousaf Ali Khan, British film director
- Yousaf Aziz Magsi (1908-1935), Baloch leader from the present-day Balochistan province of Pakistan
- Yousaf Borahil Al-Msmare (ca. 1866-1931), Libyan Muslim resistance leader fighting against Italian colonization

== Surname ==
- Bilal Yousaf (born 1928), Persian writer
- Humza Yousaf (born 1985), former First Minister of Scotland
- Jam Mohammad Yousaf (1954–2013), the 12th Jam of Lasbela, former Chief Minister of Balochistan province of Pakistan
- Kyle Yousaf (born 1993), British boxer
- The Yousaf Sisters, Jahan and Yasmine Yousaf, American music duo who make up Krewella
