= József Varga =

József Varga may refer to:

- József Varga (footballer, born 1954), Hungarian footballer
- József Varga (footballer, born 1988), Hungarian footballer
- József Varga (footballer, born 1999), Hungarian footballer
- József Varga (politician, born 1962), Hungarian politician (Fidesz)
- József Varga (Vojvodina politician) (born 1959), politician in Serbia from the country's Hungarian community

== See also ==
- József
