= József Bihari (linguist) =

József Bihari (6 May 1908, Érmihályfalva – 26 November 1997, Eger) was a linguist of Russian and Yiddish, a literary translator, and a college professor.

== Biography ==
József Bihari was born in Érmihályfalva on 8 May 1908 to seamstress Mária Friedman and shoemaker Herman Berkovits. He was one of six children. Due to unemployment, his father had to seek employment abroad, during which time the mother raised the children alone. He completed his secondary education privately with the support from his brother. His hometown was annexed by Romania in 1919, and the Romanian government abolished private education.

As he could not find a town where he could enrol in a public school pupil, he worked as a manual labourer for three years. In 1925 he moved to Budapest to continue his studies. With the help of an acquaintance he exchanged lessons for meals at different household each day. In 1927 he graduated from high school, but due to numerus clausus policy by Hungarian universities, to further his studies he had to relocate to Brno, then the capital of Moravia. After two years at the Technical University of Brno, his interest shifted to become a teacher, and in 1929 he was admitted to the Faculty of Arts at the University of Debrecen, back in Hungary. During his years at the University he spent a few months in Paris in 1930 and in Vienna in 1933. In the 1930s his work was mainly published in Transylvanian newspapers and journals. He was also an editor of the journal Mi Utunk, which also published his writings.

Several of his brothers lived in Oradea, where he spent summers. The vibrant intellectual life of Oradea had a great influence on him. In 1934 he published a study entitled The Intellectual Life of Debrecen and the French Inspirations. This was an extended version of a paper which had won a prize at the university. He also translated short stories from foreign languages.

In 1942, he was called up for military service, which became a labor camp. In March 1944, he escaped and defected to the Soviet troops). When he returned home in April 1945, he could not find any of his relatives alive in Oradea or in his home village. His four brothers and their families were killed in the gas chambers, and mother died in the queue for deportation, and his father died earlier. His only surviving brother escaped because he was forced to go abroad in 1927 due to unemployment.

He married Gulyás Rózsa in 1939 and his first child, Ágnes, was born 1941. In 1944, his wife and three-year-old daughter were deported to Austria, from where they returned in 1945. Their second child Eva was born after the war in 1948.

== Fields of research ==
=== Teaching activities ===
He received his degree in French and German from the University of Debrecen (1934) and in Russian language and literature (1946). He began his teaching career at the Israelite Civil School in Debrecen (1934–1935) and at the Jewish Gymnasium (1935–1942), where he taught shorthand and Hebrew. Later he taught at the Fazekas Mihály High School in Debrecen (1945–1949), at the Russian Language Department of the University of Debrecen (1948–1949), at the Debrecen Teachers’ Training College as acting head of department (1948–1949), and then at the Teachers’ Training College in Eger – where he was a founding member – as head of the Russian Language Department until his retirement (1949–1976). He was a native Yiddish speaker, and spoke Hungarian, French, German, Russian, Romanian; he could read and understand Old Hebrew, English and all Slavic languages. His primary and secondary education was in Yiddish, Hungarian, German and Romanian.

=== Academic activity ===
His main fields of interest were the grammar of the Russian language and the history of the Russian language. His series on the outstanding Russian linguists Polivanov, Jan Baudouin de Courtenay and others, written jointly with Professor Imre H. Tóth of Szeged, was published in the scientific publications of the College. The second major area of his research was the study of Yiddish, as reflected in the choice of topic for his academic doctoral thesis, and the preparation of the Hungarian-language Yiddish grammar. He also translated Yiddish literature. The third area of his scholarly activity is related to Eger and the Heves county. His related works have appeared in the academic publications of the college: Chapters on the History of the Serbs and Greeks of Eger (1958), The Settlement of Serbs (Races) in Heves County, with Special Reference to the Eger Aspects (1959), Slavic Heritage in the Geographical Names of Heves County (1968).

He defended his Ph.D. thesis "The aspect system of the Russian verb" in 1963. Doctor of the Hungarian Academy of Sciences from 1972 ("Slavic heritage in a German dialect")

=== Honours and memories ===
- Distinguished Worker in Education (1958)
- Silver Medal of Labour (1966)
- Gold Medal of the Order of Labour (1974)
- Medal of Honour Pro Academia Pedagogica Agreiensi (1970)
- Memorial tree and plaque in Eger, Egészségház utca. Inaugurated 30 April 2023.

== Publications ==
- К вопросу о возникновении категории вида в русском языке. (redigit St. Kniezsa): Studia Slavica Academiae Scientiarium Hungaricae. Tomus VIII. Fasc. Akadémiai Kiadó, 1962.
- Great Russian Linguists, 1–4. Scientific Publications of the Eger Teacher Training College, Eger, 1965–1972. Co-authored by Imre H. Tóth. In Hungarian.
- Aspect Problems in Modern Russian The Yearbook of the Pedagogical College of Eger. 1962. (Acta Academiae Paedagogicae Agriensis; Tom. 8). pp. 175–212. In Hungarian.
- Expression of the time relation in Russian time-defining sentences Scientific Bulletins of the Teacher Training College of Eger (New Series, Vol. 4). Eger, 1966. pp. 227–260. In Hungarian.
- Some methodological problems of teaching Russian verb aspects Scientific communications of the Teachers’ Training College of Eger (Vol. 1.). Eger, 1963. pp. 51–85. In Hungarian.
- The stress of Russian verbs. Yearbook of the Eger Pedagogical College (Vol. 6). Eger, 1960. pp. 207–260. In Hungarian.
- The change of stress of Russian adjectives and their teaching The Scientific Bulletins of the Eger Teacher Training College (New Series, Vol. 7. Eger, 1969. pp. 81–104.
- Jewish family and place names. Yearbook. 1977/78 (in Hungarian). Budapest: National Representation of Hungarian Israelites. pp. 56–74.
- Introduction to Ruthenian Studies. Second, revised edition: 1982. Co-author: Imre H. Tóth. In Hungarian
- Madach Imre: Az ember tragédiája (ford. jiddisre: Holder József) latin betűs átírása: Bihari József.
- József Bihari's Grammar of the Yiddish Language (in Hungarian). Kézirat: Yivo Institute for Yewish Research Repository. 1989.
