= József Tóth =

József Tóth is the name of:

- József Tóth (footballer, born 1929) (1929–2017), Hungarian footballer who played in the 1954 FIFA World Cup
- József Tóth (hydrogeologist) (1933–2026), Hungarian-born Canadian scientist
- József Tóth (footballer, born 1951) (1951–2022), Hungarian footballer who played in the 1978 and 1982 FIFA World Cup
- József Tóth (geographer) (1940–2013), Hungarian geographer and academic
- József Tóth (politician, born 1950) (born 1950), Hungarian Member of Parliament (MSZP) and Mayor of Angyalföld
- József Tóth (politician, born 1953) (born 1953), Hungarian Member of Parliament (Fidesz) and Mayor of Tiszanána

== See also ==
- József
