= Jupp (given name) =

Jupp is a German masculine given name, short for Joseph. Notable people with the name include:

- Jupp Derwall (1927–2007), German footballer and coach
- Jupp Heynckes (born 1945), German football coach
- Jupp Hussels (1901–1986), German actor
- Jupp Kapellmann (born 1949), German footballer
