= Juuso Ngaikukwete =

Namibian clergyman (c. 1873 – 1955)

Juuso Amuaalua (Hamalwa) Ngaikukwete (born c. 1873 in Oukwanyama, Ovamboland, Namibia — died 17 June 1955) was one of the first seven Ovambo pastors, whom the director of the Finnish Missionary Society, Matti Tarkkanen ordained into priesthood in Oniipa, Ovamboland, on 27 September 1925, with a permission granted by the Bishop of Tampere, Jaakko Gummerus.

Ngaikukwete was the son of Ngaikukwete yaShimupeni and Mwalungilange yUugwanga. He was baptized on 31 December 1893 by the German missionary Friedrich Meisenholl in Oukwanyama. Ngaikukwete went to school in Oniipa during 1918–20 and to the Oniipa seminary during 1922–25. He worked in Oshitayi during 1925–34 and in Oshigambo during 1934–55.

Ngaikukwete was married to Mwaalwa Maria gaShelungu (b. 1899) and they had one son and three daughters.

== Sources ==
- Peltola, Matti (1958). Sata vuotta suomalaista lähetystyötä 1859–1959. II: Suomen Lähetysseuran Afrikan työn historia [One Hundred Years of Finnish Missionary Work 1859–1959. II: The History of FMS's Missionary Work in Africa]. Helsinki: The Finnish Missionary Society.
- Pentti, Elias, ed. (1958). Ambomaa [Ovamboland]. Helsinki: Finnish Missionary Society.
- Nambala, Shekutaamba V. V. (1995). Ondjokonona yaasita naateolohi muELCIN 1925–1992 ['Register of ELCIN Clergy 1925–1992']. Oniipa, Namibia: ELCIN. p. 162.
