= Margie Hohepa =

New Zealand education academic

- Born: Margie Kahukura Hohepa; 1960 (age 65–66)
- Other name: Margie Ratapu
- Education: University of Auckland
- Scientific career
- Fields: Māori education, Kaupapa Māori
- Workplaces: University of Waikato
- Theses: Te Kohanga Reo hei tikanga ako i te reo Maori = Te Kohanga Reo as a context for language learning (1990); Hei tautoko i te reo : Maori language regeneration and whānau bookreading practices (2000)

Margie Kahukura Hohepa (born 1960), sometimes Margie Ratapu (which is her married name), is a New Zealand education academic specialising in Māori education. She is Māori, of Te Māhurehure, Ngāpuhi and Te Ātiawa descent and are currently a full professor at the University of Waikato.

== Early life ==
Hohepa was born in Auckland in 1960. Her father was Patu Hohepa, an academic. She received her primary and secondary education at Matipo Primary in Te Atatū Peninsula, Te Atatū Intermediate, Wainuiomata College, Wellington East Girls' College and Rutherford High School. She studied at the University of Auckland for a Bachelor of Arts and a Master of Arts (Hons) in Education, with the title of her 1990 master's thesis Te Kohanga Reo hei tikanga ako i te reo Maori = Te Kohanga Reo as a context for language learning. She then obtained a Diploma in Teaching from the Auckland Teachers' College.

== Academic career ==
After a 2000 PhD titled 'Hei tautoko i te reo : Maori language regeneration and whānau bookreading practices' at the University of Auckland, she continued lecturing at Auckland and in Whangarei. In 2010 she moved to an associate professorship at the University of Waikato, rising to full professor.

== Selected works ==
- Hohepa, Margie Kahukura, Stephen May, and Teresa L. McCarty. "The forum." Journal of language, identity, and Education 5, no. 4 (2006): 293–315.
- Hohepa, Margie Kahukura. "Educational leadership and Indigeneity: Doing things the same, differently." American Journal of Education 119, no. 4 (2013): 617–631.
- Hohepa, Margie Kahukura, and Viviane Robson. "Māori and educational leadership: Tū Rangatira." AlterNative: An International Journal of Indigenous Peoples 4, no. 2 (2008): 20–38.
- Smith, Linda Tuhiwai, and Margie Kahukura Hohepa. Mana Wahine, Mana Maori: A Case Study. Maori Education Research and Development Unit, Education Department, University of Auckland, 1990.
- Hohepa, Margie Kahukura. Preferred pedagogies and language interactions in te kohanga reo. Research Unit for Maori Education, University of Auckland, 1993.
