= Increase (given name) =

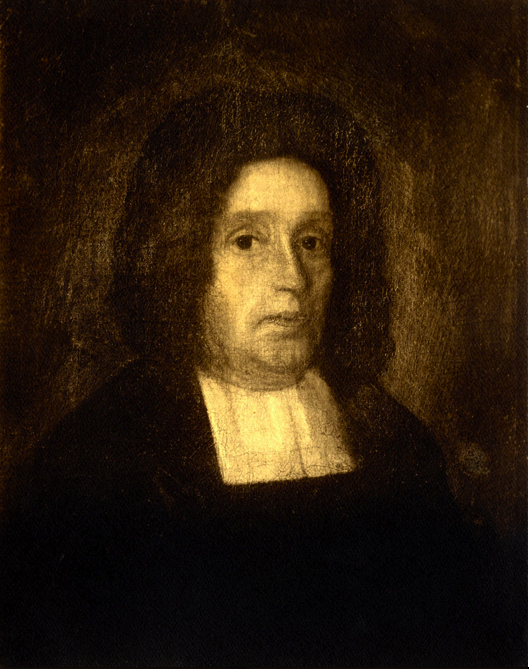
- Increase Mather, colonial Puritan minister
- Pronunciation: /ɪnˈkriːs, ˈɪnkriːs/
- Gender: Male

Origin
- Origin: English
- Meaning: Increase
- Region of origin: England

Other names
- Related names: Joseph

Increase is a masculine given name.

Originating in England, the name was given primarily among Puritans in colonial New England and in the early 19th century in the United States. Since the 19th century, the name has decreased in popularity and is now rare, if not extinct.

== Meaning and origin ==
The name Increase is the English literal translation of the name Joseph, which originates from the Hebrew language. The Hebrew version of Joseph, Yosef (יוֹסֵף), translates as meaning "Yahweh will/shall increase/add," or "He will add." This name, in turn, originates from the Hebrew verb yasap (יסף), which means "to add, increase, or repeat." Thus, the name Increase, originated in England and was a literal translation of the Hebrew name and verb, which relates to "increase" as another child as a gift from God.

While first originating in England, the name Increase came to be used primarily by Puritans in the early colonial United States, particularly in New England.

It was written about Increase Mather (1639–1723), the Puritan minister, academic, and influential figure in the Massachusetts Bay Colony, that the reason he was given the name Increase was "... the never-to-be-forgotten increase, of every sort, wherewith God favoured the country about the time of his nativity".

== Notable people ==
- Increase A. Lapham (1811–1875), American writer, scientist and naturalist
- Increase Mather (1639–1723), American Puritan minister and academic, President of Harvard College
- Increase Moseley (1712–1795), American politician, Speaker of the Vermont House of Representatives
- Increase Nowell (1590–1655), English-born American colonial settler and administrator
- Increase Sumner (1746–1799), American lawyer, politician, Associate Justice of the Massachusetts Supreme Judicial Court and 5th Governor of Massachusetts
- Increase N. Tarbox (1815–1888), American writer and theologian
