= Josephus (disambiguation) =

Josephus (Titus Flavius Josephus; 37 – c. 100) was a Roman Jewish historian.

Josephus may also refer to:

== From the Middle Ages, and: Renaissance (Latinized names) ==
- Josephus Abudacnus/Josephus Barbatus (Yusuf ibn Abu Dhaqn; born 1570s), Egyptian Coptic writer
- Josephus Adjutus (c. 1602–1668), Assyrian theologian
- Josephus Blancanus (Giuseppe Biancani; 1566–1624), Italian Jesuit astronomer, mathematician, and selenographer
- Josephus Catalanus (Giuseppe Catalani; 1698–1764), Italian church historian
- Josephus Exoniensis/Josephus Iscanus (Joseph of Exeter; fl. 1180–1190), English poet in Latin
- Josephus a Matre Dei (José de Calasanz; 1557–1648), Spanish Catholic priest, educator and the founder of the Pious Schools
- Josephus Quercetanus (Joseph Duchesne; c. 1544 – 1609), French physician
- Josephus Scottus (died between 791 and 804), Irish scholar, diplomat, poet and ecclesiastic
- Josephus Struthius (1510 – c. 1569), Polish physician

== Among modern era given names ==
- Josephus Albertus "Joseph" Alberdingk Thijm (1820–1889), Dutch art critic, philologist, and poet
- Josephus Pius Barbour (1894–1974), American Baptist pastor
- Josephus "Joop" Beek (1917–1983), Dutch and later Indonesian Jesuit, priest, educator and politician
- Josephus S. Cecil (1878–1940), United States Army officer in the Philippine–American War
- Josephus Chaffin (c.1826–1873), American entertainer billed as the American Tom Thumb and the Virginia Dwarf
- Josephus Flavius Cook (1838–1901), American philosophical lecturer
- Josephus Daniels (1862–1948), American newspaper editor
- Josephus Laurentius Dyckmans (1811–1888), Belgian genre and portrait painter
- Josephus Andreas Fodor (1751–1828), Dutch violinist and composer
- Josephus E.A.M. "Jos" Geysels (born 1952), Belgian politician
- Josephus M.M. "Jos" Hermens (born 1950), Dutch long-distance runner and running coach
- Josephus Flavius Holloway (1825–1896), American mechanical engineer
- Josephus Antonius "Jos" van Kemenade (1937–2020), Dutch sociologist and government minister
- Josephus Augustus Knip (1777–1847), Dutch painter
- Josephus "Sepp" Koster (born 1974), Dutch racing driver
- Josephus J.M. "Jos" van der Lans (born 1954), Dutch cultural psychologist, journalist and politician
- Josephus Nelson Larned (1836–1913), American newspaper editor, author, librarian and historian
- Josephus C.F. "Jef" Last (1898–1972), Dutch poet, writer, translator and cosmopolitan
- Josephus Nicolaus Laurenti (1735–1805), Austrian naturalist
- Josephus Lyles (born 1998), American sprinter
- Josephus L. Mavretic (born 1934), American Marine Corps officer and politician
- Josephus Gerhardus "Jozef" Rulof (1898–1952), Dutch author who was known as a psychic and spirit medium
- Josephus R.H. "Josef" van Schaik (1882–1962), Dutch politician
- Josephus Schenk (born 1980), Dutch darts player
- Josephus Serré (1907–1991), Dutch modern pentathlete
- Josephus Tethool (1934–2010), Indonesian Roman Catholic bishop
- Josephus Thimister (1962–2019), Belgian interior decorator and fashion designer
- Josephus Albertus "Jos" Vandeloo (1925–2015), Belgian writer and poet
- Josephus Maria "Jef" Vander Veken (1872–1964), Belgian art restorer, copyist and art forger
- Josephus C. Vines (1873–1964), American politician
- Josephus Yenay (born 1975), Liberian footballer

== Among fictional characters ==
- Josephus of Arimathea, a character in some versions of the Arthurian legend
- Josephus Miller, a character in The Expanse novels and TV series

== Other uses ==
- Josephus problem in mathematics, named for Flavius Josephus
