= Hackthorne Gardens =

New Zealand heritage building

Coordinates: 43°34′35.35″S 172°38′0.84″E

Hackthorne Gardens, previously also known as Shirley and Grace Hohepa Home and Maddison on Cashmere, is a house located in Christchurch, New Zealand. It was built in 1928 and extensively restored in 2016.

== History ==
The house was designed by architect William Trengrove (also known as W.H. Trengrove) in the Art Deco style, and built in 1928. It was built for Archibald Henry Anthony, a lawyer who founded the Christchurch law firm Anthony Harper. It is located on Hackthorne Road, in the Cashmere Hills.

In 1965, Anthony sold the house to the New Zealand Trust Board for Home Schools for Curative Education. It was renamed Shirley and Grace Hohepa Home, and was used as a residential home for intellectually disabled children. In 1987, the Hohepa Home relocated to Halswell and the property was sold and re-opened as a bed and breakfast. In 1999 it was sold again and the new owners used it for accommodation for elderly people under the name Maddison on Cashmere. These owners excavated beneath the original two storeys and added ensuite rooms, a commercial kitchen and laundry, and staff accommodation, In 2010 it was re-sold and used as luxury accommodation.

The property went on the market again in 2013. The current owner bought it in 2015, and extensively renovated and strengthened it. The property now has 11 bedrooms with en-suites, a library, lounge, bar, two dining rooms, entrance lobby, two staircases and a commercial kitchen. The renovation won a Heritage Tourism Award in 2018.
