= József Rácz =

Hungarian physician and psychiatrist (born 1957)

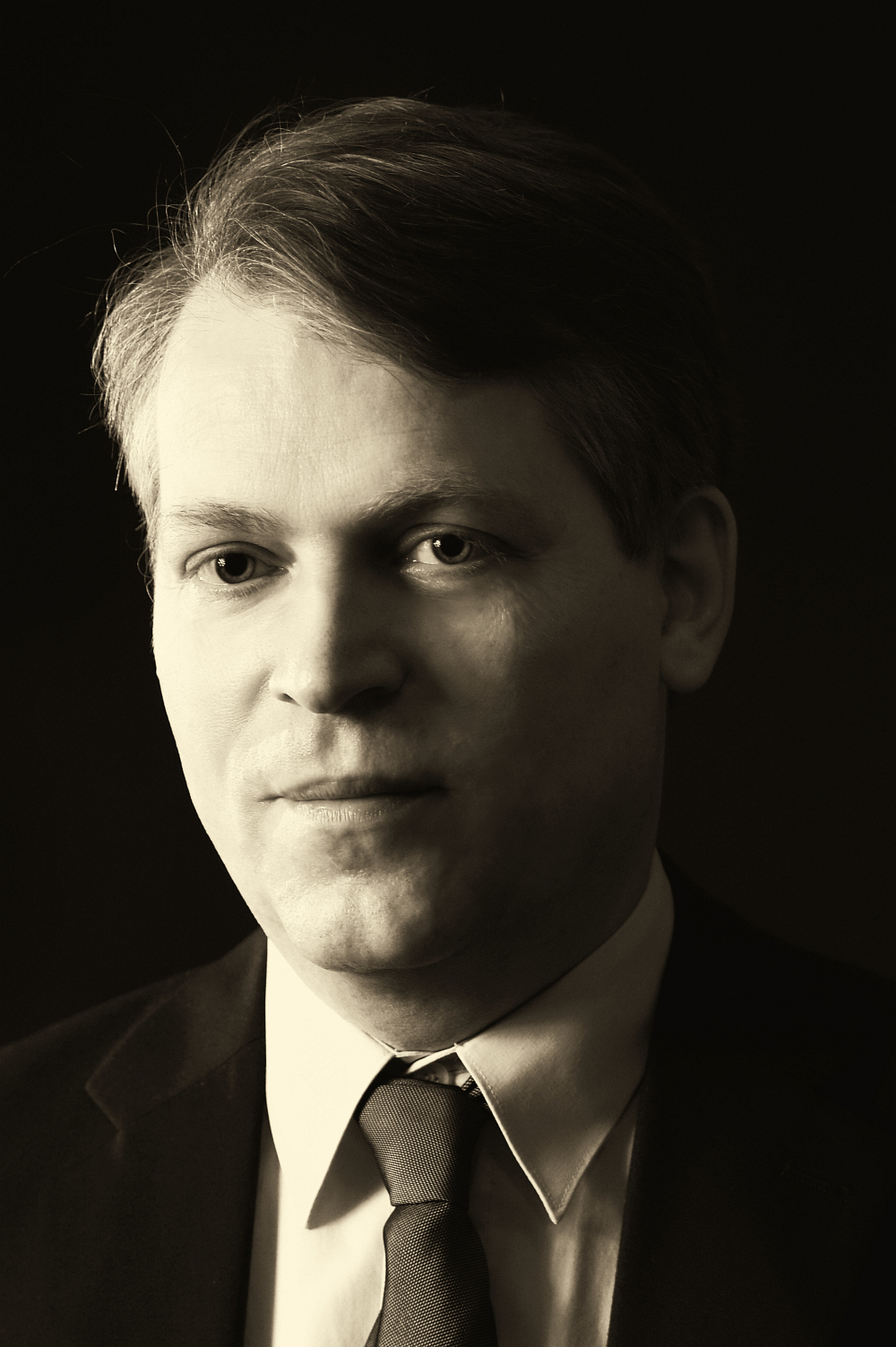
- Born: April 28, 1957 (age 69); Budapest, Hungary
- Citizenship: Hungary
- Education: Semmelweis University (SOTE)
- Known for: qualitative social psychological research of the drug users
- Children: Péter Márton Rácz
- Awards: Order of Merit of the Republic of Hungary, Officer's Cross (civil), 2019
- Scientific career
- Fields: Addiction medicine; Social psychology
- Workplaces: Department of Counselling Psychology, Faculty of Education and Psychology, Eötvös Loránd University; Department of Addictology, Faculty of Health Sciences, Semmelweis University; Blue Point Drug Counseling and Outpatient Centre
- Website: own facebook page

József Rácz (Hungarian: [ˈjo:ʒɛf ˈra:t͡s]; born 28 April 1957) is a Hungarian physician, psychiatrist, addiction doctor, full professor and the former Head of the Department of Counselling Psychology, Faculty of Education and Psychology at the Eötvös Loránd University and the Head of the Department of Addictology, Faculty of Health Sciences at the Semmelweis University, director at Blue Point Drug Counseling and Outpatient Centre. His books, papers and talks focus on qualitative social psychological research of the drug users.

== Early life and education ==
He was born on 28 April 1957, Hungary. He graduated from the Semmelweis University (SOTE), Budapest in 1981.

== Career ==
From 1996, he became the director of the Blue Point Drug Counseling and Outpatient Centre.

József Rácz lectured as a visiting professor at several universities of Hungary.

His working papers were issued in both national and international prestigious professional research scientific journals, and several books and numerous scientific articles were published.

== Awards and honours ==
- Order of Merit of the Republic of Hungary, Officer's Cross (civil), 2019

== Selected works ==
Papers

- Eszter Pados, Asztrik Kovács, Dániel Kiss, Szilvia Kassai, Máté Kapitány-Fövény, Ferenc Dávid, Szilvia Karsai, András Terebessy, Zsolt Demetrovics, Mark D. Griffiths & József Rácz (2020) Voices of TemporarySobriety – A Diary Study of an Alcohol-Free Month in Hungary, SubstanceUse&Misuse, DOI: 10.1080/10826084.2019.1705861
- Róbert Csák, Judit Szécsi, Sziliva Kassai, Ferenc Márványkövi, József Rácz (2019): New psychoactivesubstanceuseas a survivalstrategy in ruralmarginalisedcommunities in Hungary. International Journal of Drug Policy https://doi.org/10.1016/j.drugpo.2019.102639
- Asztrik Kovács, Dániel Kiss, Szilvia Kassai, Eszter Pados, Zsuzsa Kaló & József Rácz (2019) Mappingqualitativeresearch in psychologyacrossfive Central-Eastern European countries: Contemporarytrends: A paradigmanalysis, Qualitative Research in Psychology, 16:3, 354-374, DOI: 10.1080/14780887.2019.1605271
- József Rácz, Zsuzsa Kaló, Szilvia Kassai, Márta Kiss and Judit Nóra Pintér (2017): The experience of voicehearing and therole of self-helpgroup: An interpretativephenomenologicalanalysis. International Journal of Social Psychiatry p. 1–7
- Pintér Judit Nóra, Kassai Szilvia, Rácz József (2016): Szintetikus kannabinoid terméket használók identitásszerveződésének vizsgálata interpretatív fenomenológiai analízissel. Psychiatria Hungarica, 31,4:313-326.
- József Rácz, Róbert Csák, Krisztina Tímea Tóth, Eszter Tóth, Klaudia Rozmán, V Anna Gyarmathy (2016): Veni, vidi, vici, theappearance and dominance of newpsychoactivesubstancesamongnewparticipantsatthelargestneedleexchange program in Hungary between 2006 and 2014 DRUG AND ALCOHOL DEPENDENCE 158: (1) pp. 154–158.
- V Anna Gyarmathy, Róbert Csák, Katalin Bálint, Eszter Bene, András Ernő Varga, Mónika Varga, Nóra Csiszér, István Vingender, József Rácz (2016): A needle in thehaystack – thedirestraits of needleexchange in Hungary, BMC PUBLIC HEALTH 16: Paper 157. 7 p.
- Rácz J, Csák R, Lisznyai S (2015): Transition from ‘‘old’’ injected drugs to mephedrone in an urban microsegregate in Budapest, Hungary: a qualitative analysis. Journal of Substance Use, 20, 3, 178-186 DOI: 10.3109/14659891.2014.895872
- József Rácz József, V. Anna Gyarmathy and Róbert Csák (2015): New cases of HIV amongPWIDs in Hungary: false alarm orearlywarning? International Journal of Drug Policy (2015), http://dx.doi.org/10.1016/j.drugpo.2015.05.026
- Rácz József, Kassai Szilvia, Pintér Nóra Judit, Benedeczki Piroska, Dobó-Nagy Zita, Horváth Zsófia, Gyarmathy V. Anna (2015): The TherapeuticJourneys of RecoveringHelpers – an InterpretativePhenomenologicalAnalysis., INTERNATIONAL JOURNAL OF MENTAL HEALTH AND ADDICTION 13: (6) pp. 751-757.
- Levente Móró and József Rácz (2013): Online druguser-ledharmreduction in Hungary: a review of "Daath". HarmReduction Journal10:18 doi:10.1186/1477-7517-10-18
- Móró L, Simon K, Bárd I & Rácz J (2011): Voice of thePsychonauts: Coping, Life Purpose, and Spirituality in Psychedelic Drug Users. Journal of PsychoactiveDrugs43, 3, 188-198 DOI: 10.1080/02791072.2011.605661
- Rácz József, Lacko ZS (2008): Peer helpers in Hungary: A qualitativeanalysis, INTERNATIONAL JOURNAL FOR THE ADVANCEMENT OF COUNSELLING 30: (1) pp. 1–14.
- Gyarmathy VA, Neaigus A, Ujhelyi E, Szabó T, Rácz J (2006): Strong HIV and hepatitis disclosurenorms and frequentriskbehaviorsamongyoungHungariandruginjectors. Drug and AlcoholDependence. 2006; 82(Supplement 1): S65-S69.
- Rácz József 2006): Questionsontheinterpretation of drugusers' autobiographies in a country in the "early"phase of druguse, CONTEMPORARY DRUG PROBLEMS 33: (1) pp. 99–122.
- Rácz József (2005): Injectingdruguse, riskbehaviour and riskenvironment in Hungary. A qualitativeanalysis, INTERNATIONAL JOURNAL OF DRUG POLICY 16: (5) pp. 353–362.
- Rácz J (1991): Deviance-construction in Stalinistsocieties: A criticalanalysis. DeviantBehavior, 12:311 323.
- Rácz József (1992): The drugusebythe members of youthsubcultures in Hungary, INTERNATIONAL JOURNAL OF THE ADDICTIONS 27: (3) pp. 289–300.
