= József Nagy =

József Nagy may refer to:

- József Nagy (athlete) (1884–1952), Hungarian athlete
- József Nagy (boxer, born 1934), Hungarian boxer
- József Nagy (boxer, born 1953), Hungarian boxer
- József Nagy (boxer, born 1975), Hungarian boxer
- József Nagy (footballer, born 1892), Hungarian football coach
- József Nagy (footballer, born 1960), Hungarian footballer
- József Nagy (footballer, born 1988), Hungarian footballer
- József Nagy (politician) (born 1968), Slovak economist and politician
