= József Kovács =

József Kovács may refer to:

- József Kovács (hurdler) (1911–1990), Hungarian hurdler and 1934 European champion
- József Kovács (runner) (1926–1987), Hungarian long-distance runner and 1956 Olympic medalist
- József Kovács (footballer) (born 1949), Hungarian football player and 1972 Olympic medalist
- József Kovács (politician) (born 1951), Hungarian physician and politician, Member of Parliament (since 2010)
- József Kovács (wrestler) (1929–1991), Hungarian Olympic wrestler
