= Nakim Youssoufa =

Comorian footballer (born 1993)

Personal information
- Date of birth: 14 September 1993 (age 33)
- Place of birth: Marseille, France
- Height: 1.71 m (5 ft 7 1/2 in)
- Position: Right back

Team information
- Current team: Gardanne

Senior career*
Years	Team	Apps	(Gls)
2012–2013	Côte Bleue		
2013	Barletta		
2013	Triestina		
2013–	Gardanne		

International career^{‡}
2014–	Comoros	2	(0)
- * Club domestic league appearances and goals as of 18:50, 18 November 2015 (UTC) ‡ National team caps and goals as of 18:50, 18 November 2015 (UTC)

Nakim Youssoufa (born 14 September 1993) is a Comorian international footballer who plays for French club Gardanne, as a right back.

== Career ==
Born in Marseille, Youssoufa has played for Côte Bleue, Barletta, Triestina and Gardanne.

He made his international debut for Comoros in 2014.
