= Camal Youssoufa =

Comorian footballer

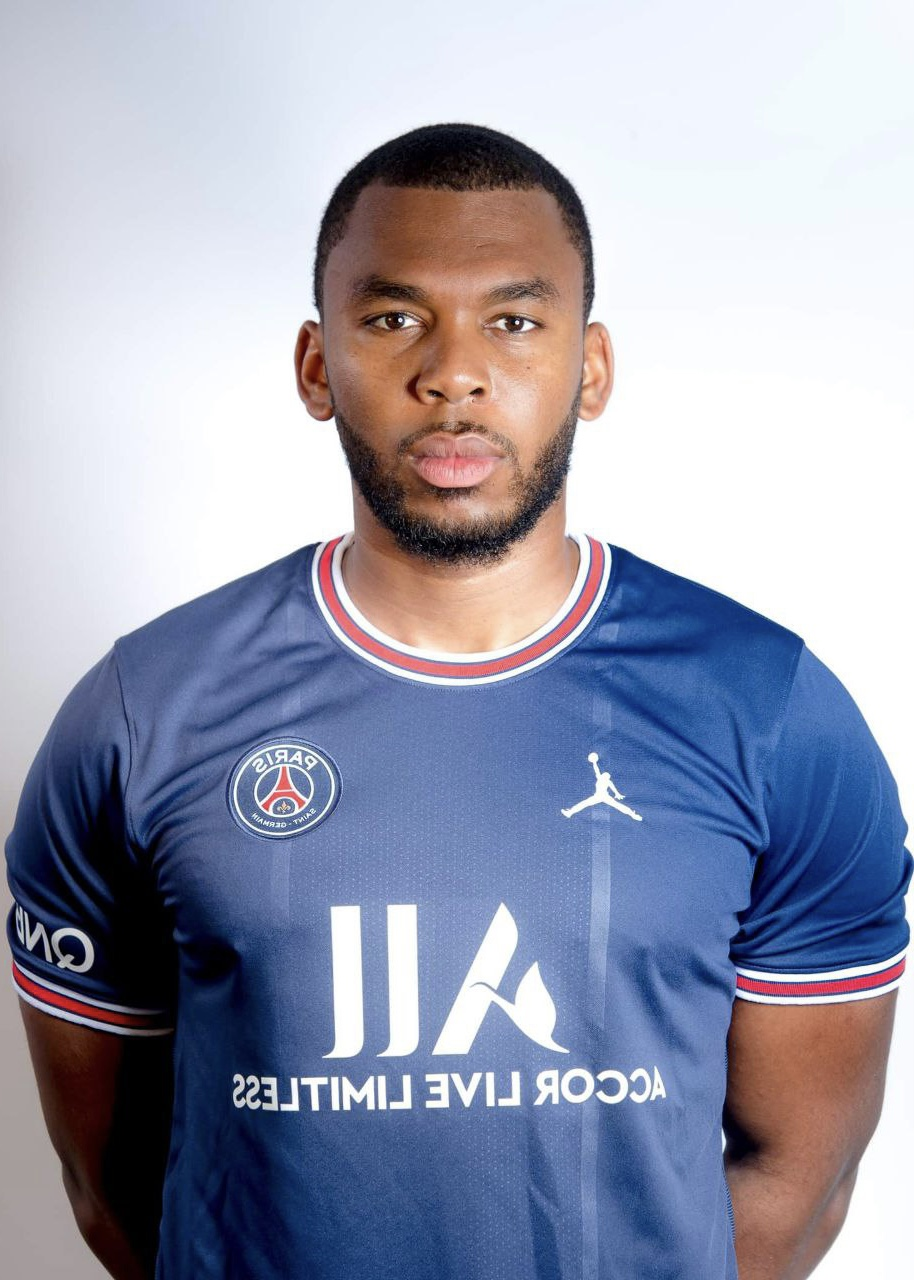
- Youssoufa with Paris Saint-Germain B

Personal information
- Full name: Camal Youssoufa M'Madi
- Date of birth: 3 November 1994 (age 32)
- Place of birth: Comoros
- Height: 1.88 m (6 ft 2 in)
- Positions: Left-back; centre-back

Youth career
- Nice

Senior career*
Years	Team	Apps	(Gls)
–2012	Nice B		
2012–2015	Valenciennes B	37	(0)
2015–2016	Saint-Quentin	22	(2)
2016–2018	AC Amiens	55	(0)
2018–2019	Les Herbiers B	9	(0)
2018–2019	Les Herbiers	13	(0)
2019–2020	FC 93	15	(0)
2020–2021	Schiltigheim	8	(1)
2021–2022	Paris Saint-Germain B	2	(0)

International career
2016–2018	Comoros	6	(0)
- * Club domestic league appearances and goals as of 16:56, 17 June 2022 (UTC)

Camal Youssoufa M'Madi (born 3 November 1994) is a Comorian professional footballer who plays as a left-back and centre-back. He has played six international matches for Comoros.
