= Joseba =

Joseba is a Basque name meaning Joseph. It is also a Basque translation of the Spanish name Jose. When translating Jose Antonio into Basque, for example, the result would be Joseba Andoni.

== Football players ==
- Joseba Etxeberria
- Joseba Llorente Etxarri
- Joseba del Olmo
- Joseba Garmendia
- Joseba Arriaga

== Bicycle racers ==
- Joseba Zubeldia
- Joseba Albizu
- Joseba Beloki

== Writers ==
- Bernardo Atxaga (real name: Joseba Irazu Garmendia)
- Joseba Sarrionandia, writer and member of ETA

== Other ==
- Joseba Elosegi
