= Jāzeps =

Male given name

- Gender: Male
- Language: Latvian
- Name day: 19 March

Other names
- Related names: Joseph

Jāzeps is a Latvian masculine given name. It is a cognate of the given name Joseph. People bearing the name include:

- Jāzeps Grosvalds (1891–1920), Latvian painter
- Jāzeps Pīgoznis (1934–2014), Latvian painter
- Jāzeps Vītols (1863–1948), Latvian composer
  - Jāzeps Vītols Latvian Academy of Music, established in 1919
