= Mucientes =

Coordinates: 41°45′N 4°45′W

Mucientes, Spain
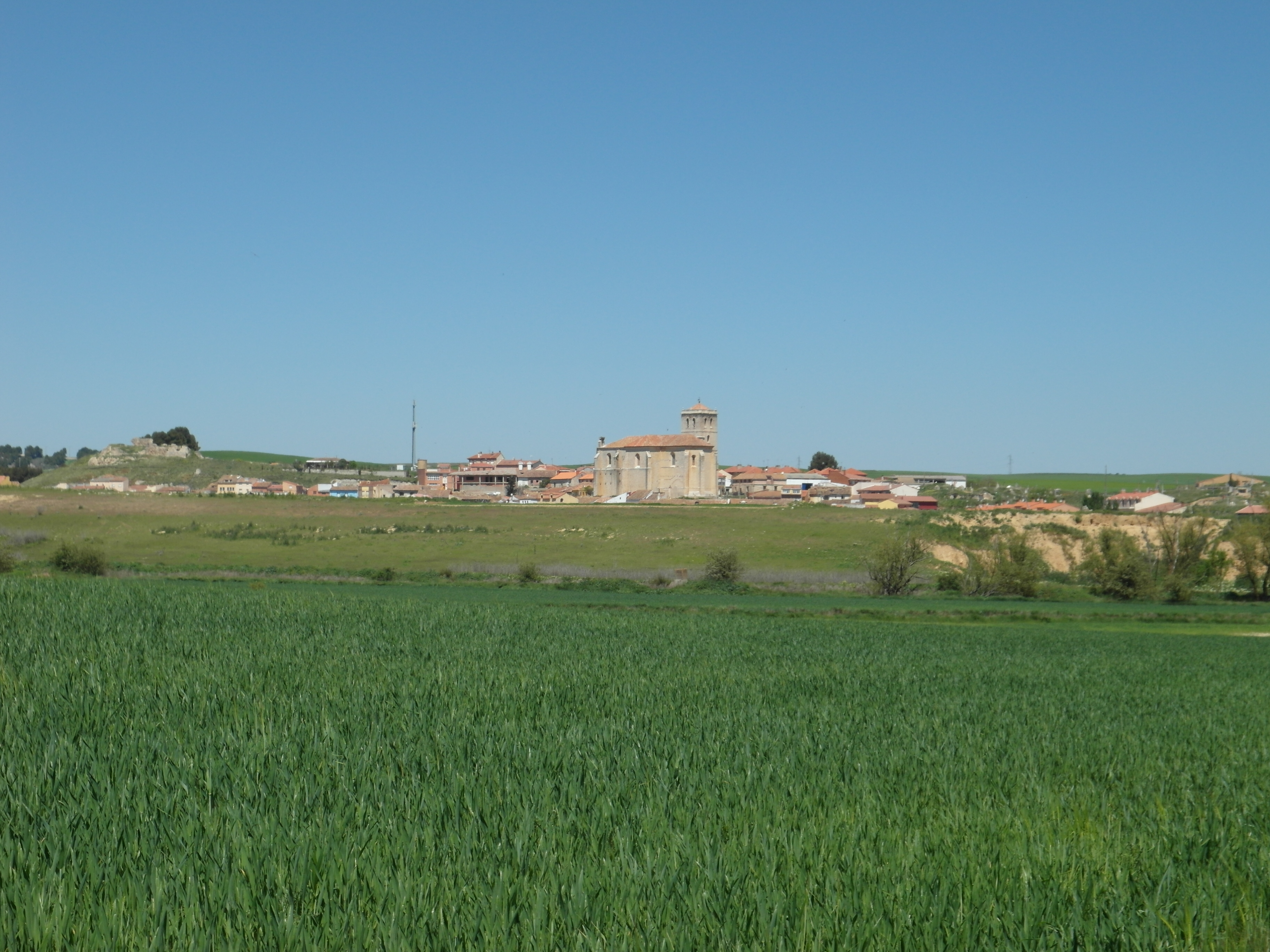
- view
- Country: Spain
- Autonomous community: Castile and León
- Province: Valladolid
- Municipality: Mucientes

Area
  - Total: 63 km^{2} (24 sq mi)

Population (2025-01-01)
  - Total: 690
  - Density: 11/km^{2} (28/sq mi)
- Time zone: UTC+1 (CET)
  - Summer (DST): UTC+2 (CEST)

Mucientes is a municipality located in the province of Valladolid, Castile and León, Spain. According to the 2004 census (INE), the municipality has a population of 632 inhabitants.

== See also ==
- Cuisine of the province of Valladolid
