= Juuso Akkanen =

Finnish professional ice hockey player

- Born: December 22, 1983 (age 41); Rauma, Finland
- Height: 6 ft 0 in (183 cm)
- Weight: 198 lb (90 kg; 14 st 2 lb)
- Position: Defence
- Shoots: Left
- SM-liiga team: TPS
- Playing career: 2002–present

Juuso Akkanen (born December 22, 1983) is a Finnish professional ice hockey player and coach who played with TPS in the SM-liiga during the 2010–11 season.

Akkanen has played most of his career in Mestis, however. In the 2017–2018 season, he became the player who played the second most regular season games (500) in the series after Aki Keinänen. Akkanen won the Mestis championship in Mikkelin Jukurit in 2013 and 2015.
