= PK (musician) =

Estonian musician (born 1989)

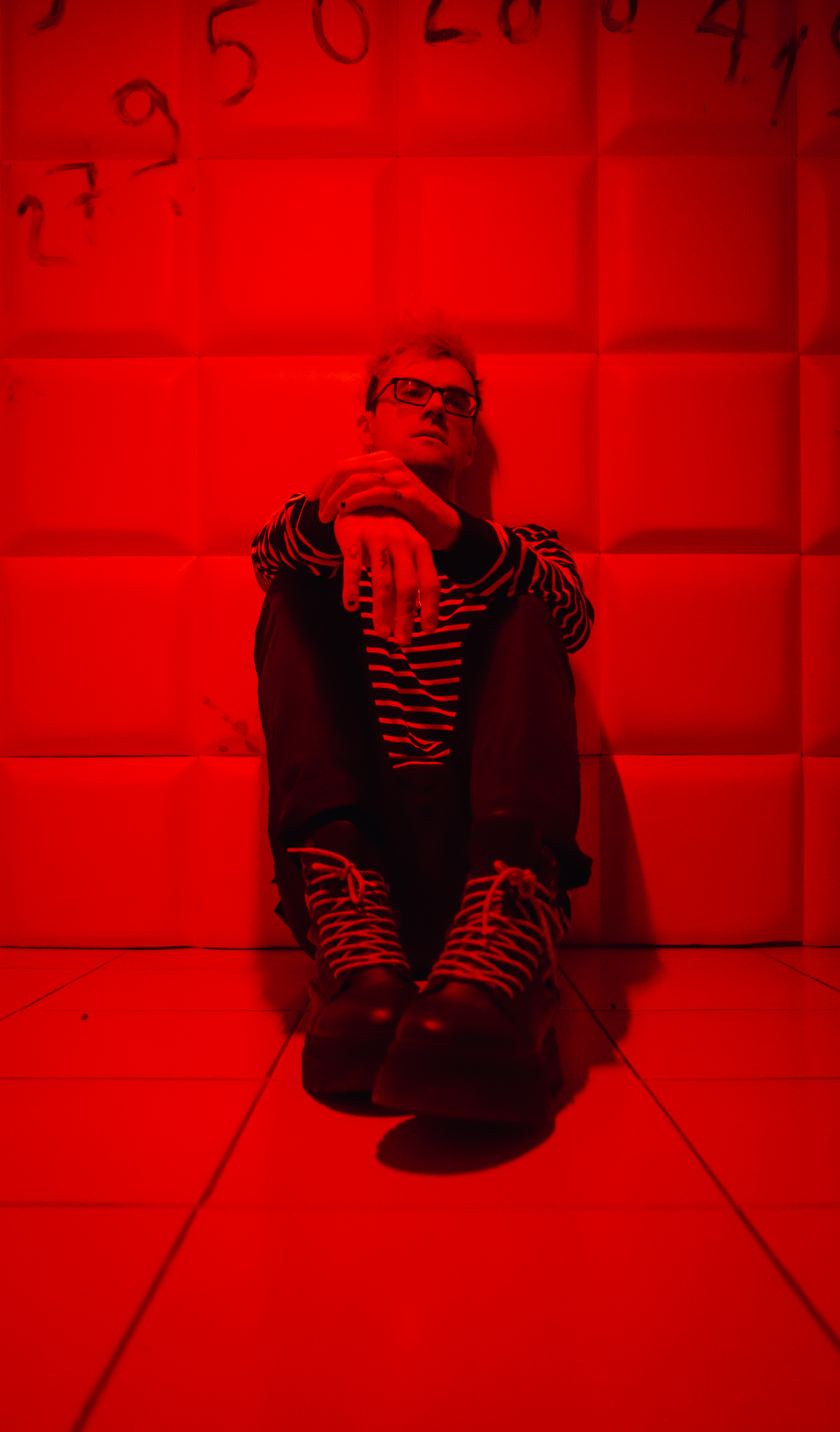
- PK on the videoshoot for his single "Remedy" photo by Raine Kapp.

Background information
- Also known as: PKestonia, Painduv Keel, Sir Frog
- Born: Joosep Vau; 3 July 1989 (age 37); Tallinn, Estonia
- Genres: New-school hip hop, alternative hip hop, euphoric frenchcore, emo rap,hyperpop,pop-punk, hardcore, emo, hardstyle, trap, indie, post-punk, rap rock, eurodance
- Occupations: Rapper; Singer; Songwriter; Promoter; Host; DJ
- Years active: 2004–present
- Labels: Chainz, Rexius Records
- Formerly of: LHV (Lüüriliselt Haiged Värdjad), BHC

PK (born on 3 July 1989 as Joosep Vau) is an Estonian musician and the founder of the "Parema Elu Nimel" movement, which advocates the right to spiritual freedom without prejudice regardless of personal status or interests. In addition to a 20-year career as a rapper and a singer, he is also a DJ and the founder of the rave series "Serious Frog Business".

== Early years in music, MC Battles ==
PK started his career in music as a battlerapper. In 2004, he released his first single "Tõrje", which featured an instrumental from s'Poom who was a known solo rapper in Estonia at the time and since then has become the frontman of the old-school hip hop group 5LOOPS.

In 2005–2007, PK took part in the annual freestyle rap MC Battle, with several encounters with Põhjamaade Hirm, who was widely regarded as Estonia's best battle MC in the 2000s. In 2006, at the age of 16, PK took part in an invite only battle hosted by Õllesummer which saw the nation's 16 best freestylers go head-to-head. He finished fourth.

== Health ==
On 27 June 2007, PK suffered a stroke at his home in Tallinn which was nearly fatal. He lost every physical function including the ability to speak and spent a week in the intensive care unit in critical condition under close observation before being moved to the general patients ward. From there he was assigned to additional two months in a rehabilitation centre in Keila, Estonia before being released to go home in the fall of 2007. Since then, newspapers and magazines including Õhtuleht, Puutepunkt and Kodutohter have published articles about the events that took place in 2007, resulting in the awareness of youth strokes in Estonia going up noticeably. On 15 March 2013, nearly six years after his accident, PK said in an interview with ETV that he had "gotten over the incident".

== SIGNATURE ==
In 2008, PK started to release solo projects again as well as forming a rap/pop group SIGNATURE with James Heckert. They released several English mixtapes over the course of their active years. In 2011, the group discontinued and PK turned back to Estonian music. The foreign scene had a big influence on his craft and he was one of the first people to start making new-school hip hop in Estonia in the early 2010s.

After SIGNATURE, PK did not make music for the next couple of years. In 2013, he started writing again.

== First Estonian albums, Parema elu nimel ==
In December 2013, he released PK7F—an independent mixtape of seven songs. At the end of 2014, he released a video for his spiritual anthem "Palverännak" and an acoustic studio video for the same song.

On 27 June 2015, PK released his first studio album Labürint. It was voted the eighth-best hip hop release in Estonia 2015. PK was voted as the 15th-best rapper in 2016 and the video for "Parema elu nimel" as the 11th-best video. The songs success grew into a motto, an idea and a party series which was held during a period of one year in Suhkrumoll, a bar in the Old Town of Tallinn. "Parema elu nimel" parties were about being united and blocking out all human prejudice. The party usually featured new-school and trap music and hosted a different performer each time. Suhkrumoll was closed and sold in 2018.

== Ideed and Masterhead records ==
On 9 July 2018, Masterhead Records made an announcement that PK would be joining their ranks. Five days later PK released his EP "Ideed" on Spotify and Apple Music.

== Hiatus from performing ==
After a show celebrating his 15 years in music and performing at Tallinn Music Week in 2019, PK stated that he would not be performing any more shows for an indefinite period of time. The hiatus was broken in December of the same year, as he gave the only performance of his new album "Amfiibinimene" at the Red Emperor Bar in the Old Town of Tallinn.

== 4AM and Dress Sexy at My Funeral ==
In the beginning of 2020, PK released "4AM", his first EP which could be described more as alternative emo rap and less conventional hip hop. Few months later, he revealed that he had been working on a bi-lingual album and leaked information that it would hardly feature any rapping at all. PKs sixth project in five years was called "Dress Sexy at My Funeral" and was released on 22 June 2022. The video single "i think the asphalt hates me" was released on 7 June and got a positive reaction from both Estonians and foreigners. He released the video for "more" a few months later. The video was a compilation of the summer of 2020 with additional staged clips.

== The three-album year ==
PK released Wet Dreams & 911 Calls at the start of 2021. The EP had strong influences of euro-trance in several songs accompanied by the artists more usual alternative rap sound. The project featured six songs with PK calling it a "story of 3 genres", where each genre had two songs to represent itself. The surreal artwork was created by an Estonian artist and designer Marju Lember. Lember had also created designs several times for singles that PK released during 2020. "Wet Dreams & 911 Calls" was voted the 14th-best hip hop album in Estonia in 2021.

On 14 February 2021, PK uploaded a video for his own version of the Blink-182 song "Man Overboard" on his Instagram page. The video featured scenes of him recording the song with comical cutscenes. A month later, on 5 March 2021, he released another cover. This time an a capella version of "Make-up Makes Me Pretty", originally performed by 93FEETOFSMOKE, a vocalist and producer from Richmond, Virginia. In July, PK released a piano version of Machine Gun Kelly's song "Play This When I'm Gone" with piano played by YouTuber Sachin Sen.

He released an Estonian song "eemal/ära" on 29 June 2021, which featured vocals from Sume Made—a young acoustic music, lo-fi and alternative hip hop artist.

On 30 August 2021, PK released a seven-song project called "brother from another struggle", he said on social media that it was "a representation of not the struggles that the world makes us face, but what our own mind does". The song "RSVP" featured vocals from an Estonia-born but Los Angeles raised pop artist SVNDRA.

== International recognition ==
On 16 February 2022, PK posted a teaser for his new video single "after eight" on Instagram revealing that it was directed by Kenneth Rüütli—a well-known videographer and musician in Estonia, who is also a member of the rap-rock group Põhja-Tallinn. Rüütli has directed numerous videos in the local scene for artists including Suur Papa, Artjom Savitski, Merlyn Uusküla, Wild Disease and others. The video was released on 22 February 2022, marking the beginning of PK's "new chapter". In the first weeks of the release, it got media coverage and radio play in Estonia, Brazil, Spain, Italy, United Kingdom and the US, making it the most successful international single PK had released. Several alternative music blogs, websites and podcasts outside of Estonia including Eat This Rock, noir rock band Edgar Allen Poets and Music Mondays covered the release of "after eight".

The acoustic version of the song was released on 14 March 2022, and featured Sume Made on the guitar.

On 15 April, less than two months after his last video, PK released "white pants". A nostalgic-sounding pop-punk song produced by Canadian rock musician Jackson Southorn, also known as Jakkyboi.

Andy Myers (DJ Kenneth A), an American EDM producer from Maryland, made a synthwave version of "white pants" which was released on 26 May 2022. Myers has won a remix competition held by Talenthouse and got the chance to remix the hitsong "Don't Stop Me Now" by Queen.

On 1 July, PK released the single "superstore", which had the melodic new-school hip hop elements from his earlier years. It was inspired by the hit single "Broccoli" and the Netflix comedy series Superstore. It was released at the same date on all the major streaming platforms as the official video for it on YouTube. It was a one-take video filmed in downtown Tallinn. "superstore" was the first single from PK which was put together in three different countries—it was produced by an American producer Harry Allan and mastered in Germany by Dominik Holond at Protonaut Studios. The lyric video for "superstore" was released on 24 July and featured pictures from PKs childhood alongside meme style fill ins.

On 2 October, PK announced on his Instagram that he will be releasing a cover version of a song by British rock band Placebo but did not state the song title. He followed the post up on 8 October, which revealed the song would be "Protect Me from What I Want" from their 2003 album Sleeping with Ghosts.

His single "freefall" was released on 14 October 2022. It featured the vocalist of Estonias best-known metalcore band Horror Dance Squad—Karl Mesipuu. It was the first record PK made in that genre and the song got callbacks to Linkin Park and Chester Bennington on social media.

In December, PK announced the first single of the next year with "eileen" set for 7 January 2023 release.

On 12 December, he released "viimane jõuluöö", a cover version of the song by legendary Estonian punk band Vennaskond. PK has stated in interviews multiple times that Vennaskond is his favorite band and their music helped him through the events of 2007. In a 2022 interview with Nataliez World he said "..and of course my all-time favorite—romantic punk band called Vennaskond" when asked about his favorite local bands in Estonia.

== The return of the "Parema Elu Nimel" party ==
On 16 September 2022, PK's party series made its return in a revamped form. Instead of the trap theme of its previous years, the event had a strong pop-punk influence featuring bands Noodle Charity and pizzafacial. The party also served as a five-year anniversary of the same named songs release.

== Rexius / the desolation era ==
In January 2023, PK signed with Swedish music company Rexius Records. On 24 April, he announced on his social media that the first single working together with Rexius would be released on 2 June along with a video. "Remedy" was released with a hectic, glitchy video that PK himself called "one of the coolest ones we made" in an interview with MuusikaPlaneet. In August 2023, PK teased a new album on his official Instagram account, posting "just read online that my new album is dropping this fall. cool". On 5 September, he revealed that his first album with Rexius Records would be released on 13 October 2023. He posted the tracklist for the album on his official Instagram account on 21 September, which included three vocalists from Estonias metalcore scene – Sixten, Anne Arrak and Karl Mesipuu. He followed it up with another post joking about how audio engineering company Leveler Audio made his "sounding like nothing" songs "insane".

== Glitch Please ==
In the summer of 2023, PK joined the team of Glitch Please – a platform for experimental music. He was an addition to a roster consisting of founder Karl Korts, creative department head and resident MIA and a local underground cult hero and resident NEOONDREED. PK and Korts gave their first live show together on 23 August 2023, at the Sofa King hip-hop edition. They performed 4 songs and followed it with a playback of Unicorn on Ketamine – Horsestyle. The setlist had never been performed by PK and all of the songs were from his emo rap period dating back to 2020 and 2021. The songs were "Phases", "the dotted line", "idk which way is up" and "RSVP". The performance began with Korts driving up to the stage in his BMW and stepping out in an alien mask. He would proceed to dance and jump around in it for the entirety of the set. When the outro ended, they stepped off the stage, entered the same car and drove off only to return moments later from the other side of the venue.

With 2023 seeing both MIA and NEOONDREED focus mainly on other projects, Glitch Please became a two-man endeavour. Korts and PK curated and hosted a festival stage together for the first time at Kõu Festival 2024, the biggest electronic music festival in Estonia. In addition to Glitch, Please label artists, notable names on their stage included White Girl, an uber-artistic satire act, My Friend Ariel from Israel, Submerged and many more. On 24 August 2024, Glitch, Please and club Hall, the ravemeka of Tallinn, held a collaborative event with Columbian techno legend Sonico headlining.

PK decided not to continue with Glitch Please a couple of months later.

== Serious Frog Business, the rave scene ==
By the time of Kõu 2024, PK had become a regular at underground events.

In November 2024, he created a party series called "Serious Frog Business". The seemingly random and light name held a bittersweet meaning. In several interviews and songlyrics, PK has spoken openly about not liking reality and wishing he could be anyone anywhere else. Along with the new party series, he began referring to himself as the protagonist "frog" on a journey to "spread the frog truth", which was used as a metaphor for selecting and playing music in his new DJ role. This wasn't the first time that PK had demonstrated such escapism-like behaviour. It happened on a smaller scale a few years earlier. Along with the lead singer of a pop-punk band Pizzafacial, they started calling themselves Unicorns, had unicorn-themed cereal before every live performance and activities done together got rebranded as "unicorn things". "Serious Frog Business" is also a symbol and a token shared with a childhood friend who PK reconnected with in 2022. As a third layer it is a satire reference to France. PK would mainly play euphoric Frenchcore in his DJ sets, the name of the party acts as a hint to its contents. In a way, "Serious Frog Business" follows in the footsteps of PK's movement "Parema Elu Nimel". They both hold similar values of acceptance, freedom and celebrate contrast.

The first frog rave was held on 30 November 2024. This also marked the first time that PK performed a DJ set, instead of using a microphone, backing tracks or a band. A week later, on 7 December, he played a set at Techno Takeover – a livestream held monthly by a sound-and video recording studio Attic Bass. His selection at both was a combination of euphoric frenchcore, happy hardcore and neo rave with a tempo range of 175 – 200 BPM.

Less than 2 months into his playing career, PK was invited to perform at TEK-IT – an underground party series that introduces the harsher and more angular music sides through various tek, core and their close relative-genres.

== labürint_katakombid. Kevin Poll ==
In 15 February 2026, Kevin Poll - a celebrated Estonian poet, graffiti artist, youth worker and rapper, passed away at the age of 36. Poll and Vau were long time friends and collaborators since their first project together back in 2015. That project was PKs debut album "Labürint" which Poll made the artwork for alongside Elis Teterin. In April 2026, PK released the b-sides, demos and tracks that didn't make it on the original album and dedicated the sequel to Poll.

== Musical style and influences ==
PK is known for mixing numerous music genres and has had albums shared into segments where 1/3 is euro-trance, 1/3 hip hop and 1/3 acoustic indie. In 2000s he mostly made underground and old-school hip hop. During the 2010s he became one of the most forward new-school hip hop and trap artists in Estonia. His style at the time was often described as melodic rap mixed with EDM. While the genre is usually known for having simple lyrics, PK found his own lane partnering club beats with style contradicting serious, angst-filled poetry. He later started adding elements from rock, punk and emo as his music became a fusion of alternative rock, post-punk, hyperpop, hip hop, rap rock, pop-punk and electronic music.

== Discography ==
=== Mixtapes ===
- "Mastermind" (2008)
- "97 Seconds: A King and a Pawn" (2008)
- "Sound is God" (2009 with SIGNATURE)
- "Alternate Universes" (2009 with SIGNATURE)
- "Can U Hear Me?" (2009)
- "All Out" (2009)
- "PK7F" (2013)

=== Albums ===
Title	Details
Labürint	Released: 3 July 2015; Label: none; Genre: alternative hip-hop, new-school hip-hop; Format: CD, digital download, digital stream
Parema Elu Nimel	Released: 3 July 2017; Label: Chainz; Genre: new-school hip-hop; Format: CD, digital download, digital stream
Ideed EP	Released: 14 July 2018; Label: Masterhead Records; Genre: new-school hip-hop, trap; Format: digital stream
Amfiibinimene	Released: 3 November 2019; Label: Chainz; Genre: new-school hip-hop, trap; Format: digital download, digital stream
4AM	Released: 1 February 2020; Label: Chainz; Genre: emo rap; Format: digital download, digital stream
Dress Sexy at My Funeral	Released: 22 June 2020; Label: Chainz; Genre: emo rap, alternative rock; Format: digital download, digital stream
Wet Dreams & 911 Calls	Released: 4 January 2021; Label: Chainz; Genre: emo rap, alternative rock, euro trance; Format: digital stream
brother from another struggle	Released: 30 August 2021; Label: Chainz; Genre: emo rap, alternative rock; Format: digital stream
appear offline	Released: 30 December 2021; Label: Chainz; Genre: alternative rock, indie, alternative hip hop; Format: digital stream
between you, me & desolation	Released: 13 October 2023; Label: Rexius Records; Genre: alternative hip-hop, post-punk, pop punk; Format: digital stream
Ideed EP re-release	Released: 7 January 2025; Label: Masterhead Records; Genre: new-school hip-hop, trap; Format: digital stream
labürint_katakombid	Released: 5 April 2026; Label: Chainz; Genre: new-school hip-hop, alternative hip-hop, trap; Format: digital stream
