= Patu Hohepa =

New Zealand Māori language academic (1936–2023)

Sir Patu Hohepa KNZM
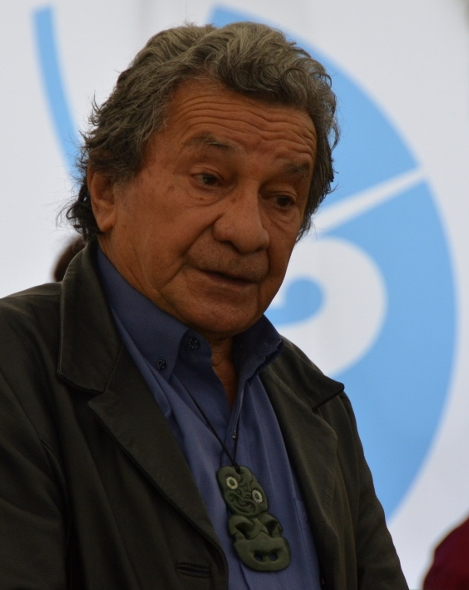
- Hohepa in 2015
- Born: Patrick Wahanga Hohepa; 1936
- Died: 22 September 2023 (aged 87); Waimā, New Zealand

Academic background
- Education: Indiana University
- Thesis: A profile-generative grammar of Maori (1965)

Academic work
- Discipline: Māori language
- Institutions: University of Auckland

Sir Patrick Wahanga Hohepa KNZM (1936 – 22 September 2023) was a New Zealand Māori language academic. In the 2022 Queen's Birthday and Platinum Jubilee Honours, he was appointed a Knight Companion of the New Zealand Order of Merit, for services to Māori culture and education.

He co-authored the book The Pūriri Trees are Laughing: A Political History of Ngā Puhi in the Inland Bay of Islands, published by the Polynesian Society in 1987. A revised edition was published as Ngā Pūriri o Taiamai: A Political History of Ngā Puhi in the Inland Bay of Islands in 2001. In 2025, the book was listed in Books of Mana as one of the 180 most significant works of Māori-authored non-fiction.

Hohepa was born in 1936, and died at his home in Waimā on 22 September 2023, at the age of 87. Margie Hohepa, also an academic, is his daughter.

== Works ==
This list is incomplete.

- Hohepa, P. W. (1970). A Maori Community in Northland. Wellington: Reed.
- Hohepa, Patrick W. (1981). Waima: The People, the Past, the School. Waima: Waima School Committee.
