= Polivanov =

Polivanov (masculine, Russian: Поливанов) or Polivanova (feminine, Russian: Поливанова) is a Russian surname. Notable people with the surname include:

- Alexei Polivanov (1855–1920) Russian military general
- Yevgeny Polivanov (1891–1938) Russian linguist, orientalist, and polyglot
