= Youssoupha Ndiaye (politician) =

Senegalese jurist and politician (1938–2021)

Youssoupha Ndiaye (9 May 1938 – 17 July 2021) was a Senegalese jurist and politician.

Ndiaye was appointed as the president of the Court of Cassation from 1992 to 1993 and the Constitutional Council from 1993 to 2002. He then served as Minister of Sport from 2002 to 2005.

He served as the chairman of the International Olympic Committee (IOC)'s ethics committee from February 2007 to September 2017, and an IOC member from 2002 to 2017.
