= Yosef =

- Pronunciation: [joˈsef]
- Gender: Male
- Language: Hebrew

Origin
- Language: Hebrew
- Meaning: will add or praise, fame taken away

Other names
- Variant form: Yossef
- Short forms: Yossi, Yosi
- See also: Joseph, Yusuf

Yosef (Hebrew: יוֹסֵף Yōsef, lit. 'he will add'; also transliterated as Yossef, Josef, Yoseph Tiberian Hebrew and Aramaic Yôsēp̄ and Yosseph, or Joseph, Arabic Yusof) is a Hebrew male name derived from the Biblical character Joseph. The name can also consist of the Hebrew yadah meaning "praise", "fame" and the word asaf. It is the Hebrew equivalent of the Arabic name Yusuf and the source of the English name Joseph.

The name appears in the Book of Genesis. Joseph is Jacob's eleventh son and Rachel's first son, and known in the Jewish Bible as Yossef ben-Yaakov.

In Christian culture, the name has the additional significance of being the name of Saint Joseph, described in the canonical gospels as the husband of Mary, mother of Jesus, and Jesus' legal father.

== Given name ==
- Yosef ben Matityahu (Flavius Josephus), Jewish general and historian
- Yossi Avni-Levy (1962–), Israeli writer and diplomat
- Yossef Bodansky, Israeli-American political scientist
- (Yosef) Joseph Caro (1488–1575), Spanish-Ottoman Talmid Chacham and author of the Shulchan Aruch
- (Yossef) Joseph Cedar (1968–), Israeli film director and screenwriter
- (Yosef) Josy Eisenberg (1933–2017), French television producer
- Yosef Elboim, Israeli rabbi, founder and head of the Movement for the Establishment of the 3rd Jerusalem Temple
- Yosef Garfinkel (1956–), Israeli archaeologist
- Yossef Gutfreund (1932–1972), Israeli wrestling judge
- Yossef Harmelin (1922–1994), Austrian-Israeli civil servant and ambassador
- Yosef Yozel Horwitz (1847–1919), "The Alter of Novardok", Belarusian rabbi
- Yosef Kapach (1917–2000), Yemenite scholar
- Yosef Karduner (1969–, born Gilad Kardunos), Israeli Hasidic singer-songwriter
- (Yossef) Joseph Klausner (1874–1958), Lithuanian-Israeli historian and professor of Hebrew literature
- (Yosef) Joseph Kossonogi (1908–1981), Hungarian-Israeli painter
- Yossef "Tommy" Lapid (1931–2008, born Tomislav Lampel), Hungarian-Israeli radio and television presenter, journalist, politician and government minister
- Yosef Mizrachi (1968–), Israeli-American rabbi
- Yosef Reinman, American rabbi and author
- Yossef Romano (1940–1972), Israeli weightlifter, held hostage and killed during the Munich massacre by Palestinian terrorists
- Yosef Yitzchak Schneersohn (1880–1950), Sixth Chabad Rebbe
- Yosef Tekoah (1925–1991), Israeli diplomat and President of the Ben-Gurion University of the Negev
- Yosef Weitz (1890–1972), Russian-Israeli director of the Land and Afforestation Department of the Jewish National Fund
- (Yossef) Joseph Zaritsky (1891–1985), Russian-Israeli artist

== Surname ==
- Jwan Yosef (1984–), Syrian-Swedish painter and artist
- Menasheh ben Yosef ben Yisrael (1604–1657), Portuguese rabbi, kabbalist, writer, diplomat, printer and publisher, founder of the first Hebrew printing press (named Emeth Me'erets Titzmah')
- Ya'akov Yosef (1946–2013), Israeli rabbi and member of the Knesset
- Elie Yossef, Israeli-British educator and political activist

== See also ==
- Hebrew name
- Joseph (given name)
- Yusuf
