= Yusuf =

- Pronunciation: Arabic: [ˈjuːsʊf, ˈjuːsɪf]
- Gender: Male
- Language: Arabic, Persian, Turkish, Kurdish

Origin
- Language: Arabic
- Meaning: God increases

Other names
- Variant forms: Yousef, Yousif, Youssef, Youssif, Yousuf, Yoosuf, Yusef, Yusup, Jusuf
- Cognates: Joseph, Yosef

Yusuf (Arabic: يوسف Yūsuf) is a masculine given name and surname of Arabic origin. It means "increases" (in piety, power and influence). It is the Arabic equivalent of the Hebrew name Yosef and the English name Joseph. It is widely used in many parts of the world by Arabs of all Abrahamic religions, including Middle Eastern Jews, Arab Christians, and Muslims. Notable people with the name include:

== Given name ==
=== Jusuf ===
- Jusuf Nurkić (born 1994), Bosnian basketball player
- Jusuf Kalla (born 1942), Indonesian politician

=== Yossef ===
- Yossef Av-Gay (born 1961), Israeli-Canadian microbiologist
- Yossef Bodansky (1954–2021), Israeli-American political scientist
- Yossef Guez (1860–1934), Tunisian rabbi
- Yossef Gutfreund (1931–1972), Israeli wrestling judge
- Yossef Harmelin (1922–1994), Israeli civil servant
- Yossef H. Hatzor (born 1959), Israeli professor
- Yossef Romano (1940–1972), Libyan-Israeli weightlifter

=== Youcef ===
- Youcef Abdi (born 1977), Australian athlete
- Youcef Atal (born 1996), Algerian footballer
- Youcef Bechou (born 1997), Algerian footballer
- Youcef Belaïli (born 1992), Algerian footballer
- Youcef Belmehdi (born 1963), Algerian politician
- Youcef Benamara (born 1984), Algerian footballer
- Youcef Boudjeltia, Algerian Paralympic athlete
- Youcef Bouzidi (1957–2024), Algerian football manager
- Youcef Chibane (born 1988), Algerian footballer
- Youcef Chorfa (born 1954), Algerian politician
- Youcef Douar (born 1997), Algerian footballer
- Youcef Dris (born 1945), Algerian writer and journalist
- Youcef Ghazali (born 1988), Algerian footballer
- Youcef Izem (born 2007), Algerian footballer
- Youcef Khatib (1932–2023), Algerian doctor and military officer
- Youcef Laouafi (born 1996), Algerian footballer
- Youcef Sabri Medel (born 1996), Algerian badminton player
- Youcef Nadarkhani (born 1977), Iranian pastor and prisoner
- Youcef Reguigui (born 1990), Algerian road racing cyclist
- Youcef Saïbi (born 1982), Algerian footballer
- Youcef Touati (1989–2017), Algerian footballer
- Youcef Yousfi (born 1941), Algerian politician
- Youcef Zighoud (1921–1956), Algerian revolutionary
- Youcef Zirem (born 1964), Algerian writer, activist, and journalist

=== Yousef ===
- Yousef Abdelrahman (born 2000), Emirati footballer
- Yousef Al-Abed, Palestinian-American chemist
- Yousef Abu-Taleb, American actor
- Yousef Ahmad (born 1955), Qatari artist, art adviser, collector, writer, and educator
- Yousef Suleiman al-Ahmad (born 1956), Syrian economist and politician
- Yousef Ahmadi, Afghan politician
- Yousef Ahmed (footballer, born 1988) (born 1988), Saudi-Qatari footballer
- Yousef Ahmed (footballer, born 1994) (born 1994), Emirati footballer
- Yousef Alavi (1928–2013), Iranian-American mathematician
- Yousef Algafari (born 1972), Saudi businessman
- Yousef Alikhani (born 1975), Iranian writer
- Yousef Al-Alousi (born 1993), Jordanian footballer
- Yousef Asfour (born 1955), Palestinian businessman and philanthropist
- Yousef Al-Askari (born 1994), Kuwaiti swimmer
- Yousef Ayman (born 1999), Emirati footballer
- Yousef Aymen (born 1999), Egyptian-Qatari footballer
- Yousef Azizi (Bani-Torof) (born 1951), British-Iranian journalist and dissident
- Yousef Hani Ballan (born 1996), Qatari footballer
- Yousef Bashir (born 1989), Palestinian-American author and peace activist
- Yousef Behzadi (born 1990), Iranian footballer
- Yousef Beidas (1912–1968), Palestinian-Lebanese banker
- Yousef Al-Benyan (born 1962), Saudi businessman and politician
- Yousef Casewit, Egyptian-American Quranic scholar and academic
- Yousef Gamal El-Din (born 1985), Egyptian-Swiss entrepreneur, author, and news anchor
- Yousef Al-Dokhi (born 1973), Kuwaiti footballer
- Yousef Emadi (born 1984), Iranian composer, musician, music researcher, and poet
- Yousef Hussain Kamal Al Emadi (born 1948), Qatari economist and politician
- Yousef Sheikh Al-Eshra (born 1979), Syrian footballer
- Yousef Fakhro (born 1983), Swedish-Lebanese footballer
- Yousef Fawaz (born 2002), Saudi footballer
- Yousef Ghaderian (born 1993), Iranian wrestler
- Yousef Ghanima (1885–1950), Iraqi politician, journalist, and historian
- Yousef VII Ghanima (1881–1958), Iraqi Chaldean Catholic archbishop
- Yousef Ghawanmeh (1935–2021), Jordanian historian, anthropologist, professor, and author
- Yousef El Ghoul (1936–1997), Libyan football referee
- Yousef Haikal (1907–1989), Palestinian-Jordanian diplomat and politician
- Yousef Al-Harbi (born 1997), Saudi footballer
- Yousef Hassan (born 1996), Qatari footballer
- Yousef Huneiti (born 1959), Jordanian Army officer
- Yousef El-Issa (1870–1948), Palestinian journalist
- Yousef Jabareen (born 1972), Arab-Israeli academic and politician
- Yousef Abu Jalboush (born 1998), Jordanian footballer
- Yousef Al-Jarrah (born 1965), Saudi actor
- Yousef Abu Al-Jazar (born 1999), Jordanian footballer
- Yousef al-Kalabi (born 1978), Iraqi politician
- Yousef el Kalai (born 1981), Moroccan-Portuguese long-distance runner
- Yousef Karam (born 1993), Kuwaiti sprinter
- Yousef Karami (born 1983), Iranian taekwondo athlete
- Yousef al-Khalidi (1842–1906), Ottoman politician
- Yousef Khamees (born 1990), Saudi footballer
- Yousef Khamees (footballer, born 1961) (born 1961), Saudi footballer
- Yousef Khanfar (born 1956), Palestinian-American photographer and author
- Yousef Khateri (born 1971), Iranian boxer
- Yousef Kolahdouz (1946–1981), Iranian Army general
- Yousef Al-Kubaisi (born 1993), Qatari footballer
- Yousef Abou Louz (born 1956), Jordanian poet and journalist
- Yousef al-Mahafdha, Bahraini human rights activist and researcher
- Yousef Majed (born 2005), Kuwaiti footballer
- Yousef Majid (born 2003), English cricketer
- Yousef Mangoush (born 1950), Libyan Army officer
- Yousef al-Mansi (born 1953), Palestinian architect and politician
- Yousef Masrahi (born 1987), Saudi track and field athlete
- Yousef Mazraeh (born 2005), Iranian footballer
- Yousef Al-Mohaimeed (born 1964), Saudi writer and journalist
- Yousef Mohammad (footballer, born 1999) (born 1999), Syrian footballer
- Yousef Muftah (born 1988), Qatari footballer
- Yousef Munayyer, Palestinian-American writer and political analyst
- Yousef Al-Naber (born 1989), Jordanian footballer
- Yousef El Nasri (born 1979), Moroccan-Spanish long distance runner
- Yousef Nasser (born 1990), Kuwaiti footballer
- Yousef Tabatabai Nejad (born 1944), Iranian Shiite cleric and politician
- Yousef Nouri (born 1961), Iranian politician
- Yousef Al-Obaidly, Qatari businessman
- Yousef Al Otaiba (born 1974), Egyptian-Emirati diplomat
- Yousef Al-Othaimeen, Saudi politician
- Yousef Pashtun (born 1946), Afghan technocrat and politician
- Yousef Pezeshkian (born 1981), Iranian physicist, academic, and political advisor
- Yousef Qashi (born 2005), German-Jordanian footballer
- Yousef Rabhi (born 1988), Algerian-American politician
- Yousef Ramadan (born 1992), Egyptian footballer
- Yousef Rashid (born 1978), Saudi footballer
- Yousef Al-Rawashdeh (born 1990), Jordanian footballer
- Yousef Saad (born 1950), Algerian mathematician, computer scientist, and academic
- Yousef Saanei (1937–2020), Iranian Twelver Shi'a Marja' and politician
- Yousef Sabri (born 1998), Iranian wushu practitioner
- Yousef Ahmed Safar (born 1989), Emirati footballer
- Yousef Salech (born 2002), Danish footballer
- Yousef Al-Salem (1985–2023), Saudi footballer
- Yousef Al-Samoui (born 1992), Jordanian footballer
- Yousef Samy (born 1985), Afghan-American footballer
- Yousef Al Sayegh (1933–2005), Iraqi poet, novelist, and playwright
- Yousef Seyyedi (born 1996), Iranian footballer
- Yousef Shadi (born 1969), Libyan cyclist
- Yousef Shamali, Jordanian politician
- Yousef Al-Shammari (born 1997), Saudi footballer
- Yousef Shariatzadeh (1930–2001), Iranian architect
- Yousef Shawarbeh (born 1968), Jordanian politician
- Yousef Shriha (born 1991), Libyan taekwondo athlete
- Yousef Sobouti (born 1932), Iranian astrophysicist, theoretical physicist, and academic
- Yousef Sweid (born 1976), Arab-Israeli actor and dancer
- Yousef Madani Tabrizi (1928–2013), Iranian Twelver Shi'a Marja
- Yousef Taha (born 1988), Filipino-Palestinian basketball player
- Yousef Al-Thodan (born 1989), Jordanian footballer
- Yousef VI Emmanuel II Thomas (1852–1947), Iraqi Chaldean Catholic patriarch
- Yousef Vakia (born 1993), Iranian footballer
- Yousef Wali (1930–2020), Egyptian politician
- Yousef Zayed (born 1979), Kuwaiti footballer

=== Yousif ===
- Yousif Abba (born 1951), Iraqi Syriac Catholic hierarch
- Yousif Aljamal (born 1983), Filipino basketball player
- Yousif Bu Arish (born 2000), Kuwaiti-Saudi swimmer
- Yousif Al Bairaq (born 1989), Emirati footballer
- Yousif Ghafari (born 1952), American businessman
- Yousif Habash (born 1951), Iraqi Syriac Catholic prelate
- Yousif Hassan, Emirati footballer
- Yousif Ibrahim Ismaeil (born 1974), Sudanese-Canadian lawyer, rebel spokesman, and political adviser
- Yousif Jaber (born 1985), Emirati footballer
- Yousif Kuwa (1945–2001), Sudanese revolutionary, rebel commander, and politician
- Yousif Thomas Mirkis (born 1949), Iraqi Chaldean Catholic hierarch
- Yousif Mirza (born 1988), Emirati racing cyclist
- Yousif Muhammed Sadiq (born 1978), Iraqi politician and academic
- Yousif Saeed (born 1994), Emirati footballer
- Yousif Nizar Saleh (born 1994), Kuwaiti squash player
- Yousif Sheronick (born 1967), American percussionist, arranger, and composer
- Yousif Thomas (1934–1999), Iraqi Chaldean Catholic hierarch
- Yousif Umar (born 1999), Qatari footballer
- Yousif Al-Zaabi (born 1986), Emirati footballer

=== Youssef ===
- Youssef Abdelke (born 1951), Syrian artist
- Youssef Aftimus (1866–1952), Lebanese civil engineer and architect
- Youssef Bey Karam (1823–1889), Lebanese nationalist leader
- Youssef Chahine (1926–2008), Egyptian film director
- Youssef Rakha (born 1976), Egyptian writer
- Youssef Hesham (born 1985), Egyptian film director
- Youssef Hossam (born 1998), Egyptian tennis player
- Youssef Hussein (born 1988), Egyptian comedian
- Youssef Ibrahim (born 1999), Egyptian squash player
- Youssef Nada (1931–2024), Egyptian businessman and financial strategist
- Youssef Obama, Egyptian footballer
- Youssef Shamel (born 2006), Egyptian fencer

=== Youssif ===
- Youssif (burn victim) (born 2001), Iraqi torture victim
- Youssifou Atté (born 1996), Togolese footballer

=== Youssof ===
- Youssof Kohzad (1935–2019), Afghan American writer and artist
- Youssof Tolba (born 2001), Egyptian archer

=== Yusef ===
- Yusef of Morocco (1882–1927), Moroccan ruler
- Yusef Bukele (born 1989), Salvadoran businessman, politician, and economist
- Yusef Khan-e Gorji (died 1824), Iranian military leader
- Yusef Greiss (1899–1961), Egyptian composer
- Yusef Jackson (born 1970), American non-profit director
- Yusef Khan, fictional character in the British television soap opera EastEnders
- Yusef Ali Khan (1816–1865), Nawab of Rampur
- Yusef Komunyakaa (born 1941), American poet
- Yusef Lateef (1920–2013), American jazz musician
- Yusef Majidzadeh (1936–2026), Iranian archaeologist
- Yusef Mishleb (born 1952), Israeli Army general
- Yusef Salaam (born 1974), American politician, motivational speaker, and activist
- Yusef Sozi (born 1981), Ugandan-British rugby league footballer
- Yusef Urabi (died 1966), Palestinian-Syrian Army officer

=== Yusof ===
- Yusof Apdal (born 1960), Malaysian politician
- Yusof Abu Bakar, Bruneian military officer and diplomat
- Yusof Basiron (born 1948), Malaysian scientist
- Yusof Ghani (born 1950), Malaysian painter, sculptor, writer, professor, and curator
- Yusof Haslam (born 1954), Malaysian actor, film director, and producer
- Yusof Husain (1906–1975), Bruneian civil servant
- Yusof Ishak (1910–1970), Singaporean politician
- Yusof Matyassin (born 1985), Bruneian footballer
- Yusof Rawa (1922–2000), Malaysian politician
- Yusof Yacob (born 1954), Malaysian politician

=== Yusoff ===
- Yusoff Abdul Hamid (born 1949), Bruneian politician and diplomat
- Yusoff Ismail (born 1952), Bruneian politician and diplomat

=== Yussef ===
- Yussef Dayes (born 1992), English jazz drummer, composer, and record producer
- Yussef Diab (1917–1984), Israeli Arab politician
- Yussef E'tesami (1874–1938), Iranian journalist, politician, publisher, translator, and writer
- Yussef El Guindi (born 1960), Egyptian-American playwright
- Yussef al-Shihri (1985–2009), Saudi Guantanamo detainee
- Yussef Suleiman (1986–2013), Syrian footballer
- Yussef Al-Suwayed (born 1958), Kuwaiti footballer

=== Yoosuf ===
- Yoosuf II of the Maldives, Maldivian Sultan
- Yoosuf Maaniu Mohamed (born 1978), Maldivian politician
- Yoosuf Shafeeu (born 1975), Maldivian film actor, editor, writer, and director

=== Yusuf ===
- Yusuf I Jaqeli (1594–1647), Georgian ruler of Childir Eyalet
- Yusuf I, Sultan of Granada (1318–1354), seventh Nasrid ruler of the Emirate of Granada in Al-Andalus on the Iberian Peninsula
- Yusuf II, Almohad ruler (1203–1224), the ruler of Morocco
- Yusuf II of Granada (1356–1392), Sultan of the Emirate of Granada
- Yusuf III of Granada (1376–1417), Nasrid ruler of the Emirate of Granada
- Yusuf IV of Granada (died 1432), Nasrid ruler of Granada
- Yusuf V of Granada (died 1447), Nasrid ruler of the Emirate of Granada
- Yusuf Hussain Abadi, Pakistani writer
- Yusuf Hassan Abdi (born 1953), Kenyan politician, diplomat, social activist, and journalist
- Yusuf Abdioğlu (born 1989), Turkish footballer
- Yusuf Abdulazeez (born 2002), Nigerian footballer
- Yusuf Abdulla (born 1983), South African cricketer
- Yusuf bin Alawi bin Abdullah (born 1945), Omani politician
- Yusuf Abdurisag (born 1999), Somali footballer
- Yusuf Sherif Abiodun (born 1974), Nigerian politician
- Yusuf Abramjee (born 1963/64), South African journalist and anti-crime activist
- Yusuf Adebisi, Nigerian politician
- Yusuf Adebori Adeleye (born 1946), Nigerian traditional ruler
- Yusuf Adewunmi (born 1982), German footballer
- Yusuf Agha (died 1632), Safavid Ghulam and courtier
- Yusuf Ahmed (born 1997), Somali footballer
- Yusuf Datti Baba-Ahmed (born 1969), Nigerian politician, economist, and educational investor
- Yusuf al-Ajab (1895–??), Sudanese politician
- Yusuf Soalih Ajura (died 2004), Ghanaian Islamic scholar
- Yusuf Akbulut (footballer) (born 1990), Turkish footballer
- Yusuf Akçiçek (born 2006), Turkish footballer
- Yusuf Akçura (1876–1935), Turkish politician
- Yusuf Akhamrich (born 2005), English-Moroccan footballer
- Yusuf bin Alawi (born 1945), Omani politician
- Yusuf Ali (disambiguation), multiple people
- Yusuf Alireza (born 1970), Bahraini businesspeople
- Yusuf Altıntaş (born 1961), Turkish footballer and coach
- Yusuf Moalin Amin, Somali politician
- Yusuf Arakkal (1945–2016), Indian artist
- Yusuf al-Asir (1817–1889), Ottoman Islamic scholar
- Yusuf Abdullahi Ata (born 1962), Nigerian politician, economist, and teacher
- Yusuf Atılgan (1921–1989), Turkish novelist and dramatist
- Yusuf ibn 'Awkal (died 1038), Egyptian merchant
- Yusuf Aydin (born 2000), Turkish rugby league footballer
- Yusuf Aydin (politician) (born 1982), Swedish politician
- Yusuf al-Azma (1883–1920), Ottoman military officer
- Yusuf Babu, Ugandan boxer
- Yusuf Ahmad Badau (born 1971), Nigerian politician
- Yusuf Ziya Bahadınlı (1927–2025), Turkish politician
- Yusuf al-Bahrani (1695–1772), Bahraini Islamic scholar
- Yūsuf Balasaguni (1019–1077), Uyghur scribe
- Yusuf Baluch (born 2004), Pakistani climate activist
- Yusuf Banuri (1908–1977), Pakistani Islamic scholar
- Yusuf Liu Baojun (born 1963), Chinese historian and researcher
- Yusuf Kure Baraje, Nigerian politician
- Yusuf Barası (born 2003), Turkish footballer
- Yusuf Bari-Bari (1958–2015), Somali diplomat and politician
- Yusuf al-Barm (died 777), Abbasid rebel
- Yusuf Başer (born 1980), Turkish karateka
- Yusuf Bey (1935–2003), American Black Nationalist leader and activist
- Yusuf Kemal Bey (1878–1969), Turkish civil servant, politician, and academic
- Yusuf Kenan Bey (died 1915), Ottoman Army officer
- Yusuf Bhamjee (1950–2025), South African politician, academic, and anti-apartheid activist
- Yusuf Magaji Bichi (born 1956), Nigerian security personnel
- Yusuf İzzet Birand (1902–1968), Turkish military physician, academic, and politician
- Yusuf Biscaino, Moroccan diplomat, translator, and writer
- Yusuf Biwott (born 1986), Kenyan long-distance runner
- Yusuf Bizimana (born 2000), British middle-distance runner
- Yusuf Bolat (1909–1986), Crimean Tatar writer, playwright, journalist, and newspaper editor
- Yusuf Cachalia (1915–1995), South African anti-apartheid activist
- Yusuf Cassim (born 1990), South African politician
- Yusuf Çelik (born 1996), Turkish footballer
- Yusuf Çetin (born 1954), Aramaic Christian religious leader
- Yusuf Chanzu, Kenyan politician
- Yusuf Çoban (born 1996), German footballer
- Yusuf Chothia (born 2001), South African born Australian boxer
- Yusuf Hossain Choudhury, Bangladeshi politician
- Yusuf Çim (born 1991), Turkish actor, singer, TV presenter, and model
- Yusuf Corker (born 1998), American football player
- Yusuf Franko Coussa (1855–1933), Ottoman statesman and caricaturist
- Yusuf Dabageed, Somali politician
- Yusuf Dadoo (1909–1983), South African communist activist
- Yusuf Demir (born 2003), Austrian-Turkish footballer
- Yusuf Ma Dexin (1794–1874), Chinese Muslim scholar
- Yusuf Dey (1560–1637), Dey of Tunis
- Yusuf ibn Abu Dhaqn, Egyptian teacher
- Yusuf Osman Dhumal, Somali military official
- Yusuf Dikeç (born 1973), Turkish sport shooter
- Yusuf Dikko (born 1947), Nigerian politician
- Yusuf Abu Durra (1900–1940), Palestinian rebel
- Yusuf Effendi (born 1988), Indonesian footballer
- Yusuf Ekinci (1942–1994), Turkish lawyer
- Yusuf Ekodono (born 1967), Indonesian footballer
- Yusuf Elgörmüş (born 1968), Turkish doctor and businessman
- Yusuf Erdoğan (born 1992), Turkish footballer
- Yusuf Göktuğ Ergin (born 1984), Turkish archer
- Yusuf Estes (born 1944), American Islamic preacher and chaplain
- Yusuf ibn Abd al-Rahman al-Fihri (711–759), Umayyad governor
- Yusuf Emre Fırat (born 2000), Turkish cross-country skier
- Yusuf ibn Firuz, military governor of Burid atabegs of Damascus
- Yusuf Adamu Gagdi (born 1980), Nigerian politician
- Yusuf Galambi (born 1964), Nigerian politician
- Yusuf Gatewood (born 1982), American actor
- Yusuf Abdulwaheed Gbenga (born 1977), Nigerian mechanical engineer and politician
- Yusuf Fehmi Genç (born 2002), Turkish weightlifter
- Yusuf Gobir (1934–1975), Nigerian administrator
- Yusuf Gowon (1936–2024), Ugandan military officer
- Yusuf Grillo (1934–2021), Nigerian contemporary painter, muralist, and sculptor
- Yusuf Emre Gültekin (born 1993), Turkish footballer
- Yusuf Güney (born 1984), Turkish singer
- Yusuf Abu al-Haggag (1150–1245), Egyptian Islamic scholar
- Yusuf Hakeem (born 1948), American politician
- Yusuf Halaçoğlu (born 1949), Turkish historian and politician
- Yusuf Isa Halim (1894–1982), Tatar poet, schoolteacher, and linguist
- Yusuf Hamied (born 1936), Indian billionaire
- Yusuf Hamadani (1062–1141), Persian Sufi teacher
- Yusuf Hamdan (died 1939), Palestinian rebel commander
- Yusuf Hamied (born 1936), Indian scientist and billionaire businessman
- Yusuf al-Hani (died 1916), Lebanese man hanged by the Ottoman Empire
- Yusuf A. Hannun (born 1955), American molecular biologist, biochemist, and clinician
- Yusuf Haroon (1916–2011), Pakistani businessman and politician
- Yusuf Haroun (born 1985), Nigerian medical doctor and psychologist
- Yusuf ibn al-Hasan (1607–1640), ruler of Mombasa
- Yusuf al-Mu'taman ibn Hud (died 1085), King of the Taifa of Zaragoza
- Yusuf Hossain Humayun (1936–2026), Bangladeshi politician
- Yusuf Husain (1902–1979), Indian historian, scholar, educationist, critic, and author
- Yusuf Hussain (1948–2020), Indian television actor
- Yusuf Ibrahim (disambiguation), multiple people
- Yusuf Iddrisu (born 1964), Ghanaian politician and an educator
- Yusuf Idris (1927–1991), Egyptian writer
- Yusuf Bala Ikara, Nigerian politician
- Yusuf Indhacade, Somali politician
- Yusuf Islam (born 1948), British musician
- Yusuf Mahbubul Islam, Bangladeshi academic
- Yusuf İsmail (1857–1898), Turkish wrestler
- Yusuf Jamal, Pakistani Army general
- Yusuf Jameel (born 1958), Kashmiri journalist
- Yusuf Janfalan, Nigerian Anglican bishop
- Yusuf Hussein Jimaale (born 1965), Somali politician
- Yusuf Kabadayı (born 2004), German-Turkish footballer
- Yusuf Saad Kamel (born 1983), Kenyan runner
- Yusuf Kandhlavi (1917–1965), Indian Islamic scholar
- Yusuf bin Ahmed Kanoo (1868–1945), Bahraini merchant and trader
- Yusuf Karaan (1935–2015), South African Islamic scholar
- Yusuf Karagöz (born 1999), Turkish footballer
- Yusuf Karamanli (1766–1838), Pasha of the Karamanli dynasty in Tripolitania
- Yusuf Kasal (born 1988), German-Turkish professional footballer
- Yusuf Ziya Kavakçı (born 1938), Turkish-American Islamic cleric
- Yusuf bin Ahmad al-Kawneyn, Somali Muslim scholar
- Yusuf al-Khal (1917–1987), Syrian-Lebanese poet, journalist, and publisher
- Yusuf Khan (actor) (1940–1985), Egyptian-Indian actor
- Yusuf Khan (Armenian), Safavid gholam and official
- Yusuf Khatri (born 1967), Indian master craftsman
- Yusuf Khattak (1917–1991), Pakistani statesman and federal minister
- Yusuf al-Khuri (died 912), Abbasid Christian priest, physician, mathematician, and translator
- Yusuf Kırkpınar (1949–2025), Turkish politician
- Yusuf Kurçenli (1947–2012), Turkish film director, producer, and screenwriter
- Yusuf Isah Kurdula, Nigerian politician
- Yusuf bek Kurinski (1806–1878), khan of Kura Khanate
- Yusuf Kurtuluş (born 1986), Turkish footballer
- Yusuf ibn Ismail al-Kutubi, Persian scholar and physician
- Yusuf Sulaimon Lasun (born 1960), Nigerian politician
- Yusuf Lawal (born 1998), Nigerian footballer
- Yusuf Lien, Indian book illustrator
- Yusuf Dahiru Liman, Nigerian politician
- Yusuf Lodhi (1938–1996), Pakistani editor, journalist, cartoonist, and author
- Yusuf Ludhianvi (1932–2000), Pakistani Islamic scholar
- Yusuf Lule (1912–1985), Ugandan professor and politician
- Yusuf Maart (born 1995), South African soccer player
- Yusuf al-Madani (born 1977), Yemeni military officer
- Yusuf Sheikh Ali Madar, Somali politician
- Yusuf al-Maghribi (died 1611), Egyptian traveler and lexicographer
- Yusuf Mainge (born 1999), Kenyan footballer
- Yusuf Makamba, Tanzanian politician
- Yusuf Malek (1899–1959), Assyrian politician, author, and interpreter
- Yusuf Mansur (born 1976), Indonesian Islamic preacher
- Yusuf ibn Muhammad ibn Yusuf al-Marwazi (died 852), Abbasid governor
- Yusuf Maryam (born 1975), Nigerian politician
- Yusuf Matcheswalla, Indian psychiatrist
- Yusuf Mboneza (died 2022), Congolese military officer and rebel
- Yusuf Meddah, Turkish poet
- Yusuf Meherally (1903–1950), Indian independence activist and socialist leader
- Yusuf Meilana (born 1998), Indonesian footballer
- Yusuf Mersin (born 1994), Turkish footballer
- Yusuf Sa'idu Miga (born 1958), Nigerian politician
- Yusuf Motala (1946–2019), British Indian Islamic scholar
- Yusuf Mugu, Nigerian politician
- Yusuf Muhammad (disambiguation), multiple people
- Yusuf Mukisa (born 1993), Ugandan footballer
- Yusuf Atoyebi Musa (born 1976), Nigerian politician
- Yusuf Mutembuli, Ugandan politician
- Yusuf Sharifuddin Muzaffar Shah of Perak (1830–1887), Sultan of Perak
- Yusuf Mwawa, Malawian politician and educator
- Yusuf al-Nabhani (1849–1932), Palestinian Islamic scholar, judge, and poet
- Yusuf Nabi (1642–1712), Turkish writer
- Yusuf Musa Nagogo (born 1957), Nigerian politician
- Yusuf Najmuddin (1764–1798), Indian Ismaili religious leader
- Yusuf Najmuddin I (died 1567), Taiyabi Ismaili leader
- Yusuf Nazzal (1937–1972), Palestinian militant
- Yusuf Haji Nur (died 2019), Somali politician and lawyer
- Yusuf Badmus Olarewaju (1957–2026), Nigerian Islamic scholar
- Yusuf Olatunji (1905–1978), Nigerian Sakara drum player
- Yusuf Garaad Omar (born 1960), Somali journalist
- Yusuf Ziya Ortaç (1895–1967), Turkish poet, writer, literature teacher, publisher, and politician.
- Yusuf Otubanjo (born 1992), Nigerian footballer
- Yusuf Özdemir (born 2001), Turkish footballer
- Yusuf Öztürk (boxer) (born 1997), Turkish boxer
- Yusuf Öztürk (footballer) (born 1979), Turkish footballer
- Yusuf Parmar, Indian politician
- Yusuf Izzet Pasha (1876–1922), Ottoman general
- Yusuf Kamil Pasha (1808–1876), Ottoman politician
- Yusuf Rıza Pasha (1826–1894), Ottoman politician
- Yusuf Ziya Pasha (1849–1929), Ottoman politician and government minister
- Yusuf Pathan (born 1982), Indian cricketer and politician
- Yusuf Qaafow (born 1987), Somali basketball player
- Yusuf Qaed (born 1994), Bahraini tennis player
- Yusuf al-Qa'id (born 1944), Egyptian writer, novelist, and politician
- Yusuf al-Qaradawi (1926–2022), Egyptian-Qatari Islamic scholar and theologian
- Yusuf Rabiev (born 1979), Tajik footballer
- Yusuf Abdul Rahim (1923–2016), Bruneian writer and politician
- Yusuf Abu Rayya (1955–2009), Egyptian author
- Yusuf al-Sa'dun (1888–1980), Syrian rebel commander
- Yusuf bin Muhammad bin Saeed, Saudi Islamic scholar
- Yusuf Warsame Saeed (died 2013), Somali politician
- Yusuf Sağ (born 1934), Turkish Syriac Catholic hierarch
- Yusuf ibn Abi'l-Saj (died 928), Sajid Emir of Azerbaijan
- Yusuf Salahuddin (born 1982), Indian politician
- Yusuf Salim (1929–2008), American jazz pianist and composer
- Yusuf Osman Samatar (1932–2020), Somali lawyer and politician
- Yusuf Sarı (born 1998), Turkish footballer
- Yusuf Ahmed Sarinle (died 2005), Somali Army general
- Yusuf Sayfa (1510–1625), Ottoman chieftain and multazim
- Yusuf ibn al-Sayrafi (died 1161), historian from Al-Andalus and secretary of the Almoravids
- Yusuf Scott (1976–2019), American professional football player
- Yusuf Sesay (born 2002), Sierra Leonean footballer
- Yusuf Adil Shah (1450–2010), Sultan of Bijapur
- Yusuf Shakkur (1926–2018), Syrian military officer
- Yusuf Shehata (born 1996), Egyptian-American basketball player
- Yusuf Shihab (1748–1790), autonomous emir of Mount Lebanon
- Yusuf H. Shirazi (1929–2020), Pakistani industrialist, civil servant, and writer
- Yusuf ibn Umar ibn Shu'ayb, Emir of Crete
- Yusuf Sibai (1917–1978), Egyptian writer, soldier, and politician
- Yusuf Şimşek (born 1975), Turkish footballer
- Yusuf Kenan Sönmez (1948–2020), Turkish politician
- Yusuf Soysal (born 1982), Turkish footballer
- Yusuf Sulaiman (born 1963), Nigerian politician
- Yusuf Babangida Suleiman (born 1976), Nigerian politician
- Yusuf Abdullah Suman, Bangladeshi judge
- Yusuf Sununu (born 1967), Nigerian politician
- Yusuf Taktak (born 1951), Turkish artist
- Yusuf Tallan (died 2000), Somali Army general
- Yusuf ibn Tashfin (1061–1106), King of the Berber Almoravid empire
- Yusuf Tekin (born 1970), Turkish bureaucrat and politician
- Yusuf ibn Umar al-Thaqafi (died 745), Umayyad governor
- Yusuf Tibazi (born 1996), American-Moroccan swimmer
- Yusuf Tijani (born 1972), Nigerian politician
- Yusuf Touré (born 2000), Ivorian footballer
- Yusuf Tuggar (born 1967), Nigerian diplomat and politician
- Yusuf Tunaoğlu (1946–2000), Turkish footballer and sports writer
- Yusuf Tunç (born 2000), Turkish footballer
- Yusuf Türk (born 1998), Turkish footballer
- Yusuf Uçar (born 1987), Turkish Paralympic goalball player
- Yusuf Abd Wahab (born 1963), Malaysian politician
- Yusuf Widiyanto (born 1994), Indonesian wushu practitioner
- Yusuf Buba Yakub (born 1968), Nigerian politician
- Yusuf Yasin (1888−1962), Syrian-Saudi politician
- Yusuf Yaska (1592–1636), Kurdish poet
- Yusuf Yazbek (1901–1982), Lebanese journalist and politician
- Yusuf Yazıcı (born 1997), Turkish footballer
- Yusuf Yilmaz (born 1991), Turkish footballer
- Yusuf Ziya Yılmaz (born 1951), Turkish engineer and politician
- Yusuf Yusuf, American politician
- Yusuf Abubakar Yusuf (born 1956), Nigerian politician
- Yusuf Salman Yusuf (1901–1949), Iraqi communist activist
- Yusuf Za'arur (1902–1969), Iraqi qanun player
- Yusuf ibn Urunbugha al-Zaradkash, Mamluk siege engineer
- Yusuf Zuayyin (1931–2016), Syrian politician

=== Yusif ===
- Yusif Abubakar (died 2018), Ghanaian football coach
- Yusif Akhundzade (born 1946), Azerbaijani military conductor and director
- Yusif Aliyev (1969–1991), Azerbaijan war hero
- Yusif Basigi (born 1972), Ghanaian football manager
- Yusif Vazir Chamanzaminli (1887–1943), Azerbaijani statesman and writer
- Yusif Huseynov (1928–2009), Azerbaijan painter
- Yusif İmanov (born 2002), Azerbaijani footballer
- Yusif Jafarov (born 1952), Azerbaijani historian
- Yusif Kerimov (1926–1997), Azerbaijani electrical engineer
- Yusif Mammadaliyev (1905–1961), Azerbaijani chemist
- Yusif Mammadov (born 1950), Azerbaijani academic
- Yusif Mirzayev (1958–1993), Azerbaijani war hero
- Yusif Nabiyev (born 1997), Azerbaijani footballer
- Yusif Qarabaghi (1532–1591), Safavid scientist, doctor, and philosopher
- Yusif Rahman (born 1993), Ghanaian footballer
- Yusif Sadykhov (1918–1971), Azerbaijani war hero
- Yusif Samadoghlu (1935–1998), Azerbaijani writer
- Yusif Sayigh (1916–2004), Palestinian economist and politician
- Yusif Sulemana (born 1972), Ghanaian politician
- Yusif Ziya Talibzadeh (1877–1923), Azerbaijani educator, politician, playwrighter, and soldier
- Yusif Yakubu (born 1976), Ghanaian footballer
- Yusif Yusifov (1929–1998), Azerbaijani historian, linguist, toponymist, orientalist, and Turkologist

=== Yusup ===
- Yusup Abdusalomov (born 1977), Tajik wrestler
- Yusup Atabayev (born 1994), Turkmen chess grandmaster
- Yusup Batirmurzaev (born 1996), Kazakh freestyle wrestler
- Yusup Guguyev (born 1972), Russian football coach
- Yusupbek Mukhlisi (1920–2004), Uyghur nationalist and military officer
- Yusup Prasetiyo (born 1990), Indonesian football manager
- Yusup'Ali Wahaf (born 1999), Chinese footballer

=== Yusuph ===
- Yusuph Mgwao (born 1988), Tanzanian footballer
- Yusuph Nassir (born 1965), Tanzanian politician
- Yusuph Olaniyonu (born 1966), Nigerian journalist, lawyer, and public administrator

=== Yusupha ===
- Yusupha Bobb (born 1996), Gambian footballer
- Yusupha Ngum, Gambian singer and songwriter
- Yusupha Njie (born 1994), Gambian footballer
- Yusupha Yaffa (born 1996), Gambian footballer

== Surname ==
=== Giousouf ===
- Cemile Giousouf (born 1978), German-Turkish politician

=== Yousef ===
- Abd-El-Aziz Yousef (born 1999), Somali footballer
- Farrah Yousef (born 1989), Syrian singer
- Hediya Yousef (born 1973), Syrian politician
- Mosab Hassan Yousef (born 1978), Palestinian spy
- Ramzi Yousef (born 1968), Pakistani terrorist who organized 1993 World Trade Center bombing

=== Youssef ===
- Bassem Youssef (born 1974), Egyptian writer and comedian
- Dhafer Youssef (born 1967), Tunisian singer and oud player
- Maimouna Youssef, American singer and rapper
- Maya Youssef (born 1984), Syrian musician
- Michael Youssef (born 1948), Egyptian-American pastor
- Mohamed Youssef (basketball) (born 1986), Libyan basketball player
- Ramy Youssef (handballer) (born 1980), Egyptian handball player
- Ramy Youssef (born 1991), Egyptian-American actor
- Rania Youssef (born 1973), Egyptian actress

=== Yousuf ===
- Mohammad Yousuf (cricketer) (born 1974), Pakistani cricketer

=== Yusef ===
- Anatol Yusef (born 1978), British actor
- Malik Yusef (born 1971), American performing poet and rapper
- Mohammad Yusef the Painter, Safavid artist
- Molla Yusef (disambiguation), several people

=== Yusof ===
- Khairuddin Mohamed Yusof (born 1939), Malaysian professor
- Meor Aziddin Yusof (1967–2021), Malaysian folk singer-songwriter
- Mohammad Said Yusof (1959–2023), Malaysian politician

=== Yusuf ===
- Abul Kalam Muhammad Yusuf (1926–2014), Bangladeshi politician
- Abu Yaqub Yusuf (1135–1184), Almohad caliph
- Ali Yusuf Kenadid (died 1927), Somali sultan of the Sultanate of Hobyo
- Ayisat Yusuf (b. 1985), Nigerian footballer
- Haji Bashir Ismail Yusuf (1912–1984), Somali politician
- Hamza Yusuf (born 1958), American Islamic scholar
- Hanna Yusuf (1992–2019), Somali-British journalist and broadcaster
- Isa Yusuf Alptekin (1901–1995), Uyghur politician
- Maria Yusuf, Ethiopian activist
- Mohamed Ali Yusuf (1944–2024), Somali politician and statesman
- Mohammad Yusuf (politician) (1917–1998), prime minister of Afghanistan
- Mohammed Yusuf (Boko Haram) (1970–2009), Nigerian Muslim sect founder and leader
- Sami Yusuf (born 1980), British singer-songwriter
- Zia Yusuf (born 1986), British politician

== See also ==
- Yusufzai
- Yusuf (surah)
- Joseph (given name)
- Joseph in Islam
- Yusuf Muhammad (disambiguation)
- Mohammad Yousuf (disambiguation)
- Hajj Yusef (disambiguation) – places
- Hajji Yusef (disambiguation) – places
- Yusuf Yusuf, Somalia-born American politician
- Arabic name
- Turkish name
