= Hajj Yusef =

Hajj Yusef or Haj Yusef or Hajj Yusof (Persian: حاج يوسف) may refer to:

- Haj Yusef-e Olya, East Azerbaijan Province
- Haj Yusef-e Sofla, East Azerbaijan Province
- Hajj Yusef, Markazi
