= Hajji Yuseflu =

Hajji Yuseflu (Persian: حاجي يوسف لو) may refer to:

- Hajji Yuseflu-ye Olya
- Hajji Yuseflu-ye Sofla
