= Harindarpal Banga =

Indian entrepreneur and philanthropist

- Born: Amritsar, India
- Citizenship: Indian
- Education: Extra First Class; T.S. Dufferin (1968) Master Mariner (1976) Fellow of the Institute of Chartered Shipbrokers
- Alma mater: T.S. Dufferin
- Years active: 1979 to date
- Organization: The Caravel Group Limited
- Known for: Founder, Chairman & CEO of The Caravel Group Ltd & Chairman of Fleet Management Ltd
- Spouse: Indra Banga
- Children: 2, Ganeet Banga, Angad Banga

Harindarpal Singh Banga, known as Harry Banga, is an Indian entrepreneur and philanthropist. He is the Founder, Chairman, and CEO of The Caravel Group Limited.

According to Forbes, as at April 2022, Banga has a net worth of $2.8 billion and is ranked as the 1,196th richest person in the world.

== Early life and education ==
Born in Amritsar in a Sikh Saini Family, and raised in Chandigarh, Harindarpal Banga was educated at the Training Ship Dufferin, India’s oldest maritime academy. He earned his Master Mariner certification in 1976 and was commanding merchant vessels at the age of 27.

== Career ==
Banga began his career in the maritime industry before going into the commodities business. Prior to forming Caravel together with his two sons, he was Vice-Chairman of the Noble Group Limited, a global commodities trading business.

In 1979 Banga joined the Gulf Group in Hong Kong – where he still lives – as Operations Manager. The Gulf Group was a Geneva-based international shipping and commodities business.

Banga left Gulf in 1989 and became an early partner in Noble Group Limited in cooperation with Richard Elman, helping to establish and lead Noble Chartering Limited. Noble Group was a supply chain manager of agricultural, industrial and energy products and Asia's largest commodities trader. Following Noble Group’s Hong Kong listing in 1994, Banga served as Vice-Chairman of the Group, and despite a low public profile, is widely credited as the driving force behind much of Noble’s success. In 2010 Banga stepped down as Vice-Chairman of Noble Group Ltd but remained on the Board as Vice-Chairman Emeritus. In 2011 he purchased the Noble Group’s ship management arm, Fleet Management Limited, from Noble. Which is one of the biggest third party ship management company. He severed his ties with Noble in 2012. In 2025, he was listed on the Forbes billionaires list as one of Hong Kong’s 40 richest men.

== Philanthropy ==
Harry Banga is known for his philanthropy, exercised primarily through The Caravel Group’s charitable arm, The Caravel Foundation Limited. The Caravel Foundation awards scholarships to help deserving students attending Dartmouth College, Duke University and Princeton University. In Hong Kong, it has a close partnership with the City University of Hong Kong (CityU).

== Awards ==
- Honored in 2011 with the Pravasi Bharatiya Samman Award, the highest distinction conferred by the Indian government on overseas Indians.
- Named as a “Most Influential Business Leader of Asia” by The Economic Times in 2019
