= List of Chittagong Medical College alumni =

List of notable students of Chittagong Medical College

This List of Chittagong Medical College alumni includes notable students of Chittagong Medical College.

== List ==
Name	Notability	Notes
Pran Gopal Datta	Vice Chancellor of Bangladesh Medical University	
Samanta Lal Sen	former Health minister	
Muhammad Afsarul Ameen	Minister of Primary and Mass Education	
Md Sayedur Rahman	former vice chancellor of Bangladesh Medical University	
Md. Shahinul Alam	former vice chancellor of Bangladesh Medical University	
Sayeba Akhter	Ekushey Padak awardee	
Kazi Kamruzzaman	Ekushey Padak awardee	
Shahaduz Zaman	Bangla Academy Literary Award winner	
Syed Atiqul Haq	president of Asia Pacific League of Associations for Rheumatology	
Shahadat Hossain	Mayor of Chittagong City Corporation	
Babar Ali	Mount Everest conqurer	
Mohammad Yousuf	former commandant of Armed Forces Medical College	
Pranab Kumar Chowdhury	Swadhinata Smarak Sommanona Padak awardee	
Abul Kasem	Member of parliament from Chittagong-10	
Mozammel Hossain	member of parliament from Bagerhat-1 and Bagerhat-4	

== See also ==
- List of Chittagong Medical College faculties
