= Naqash =

Naqash is a surname. Notable people with the surname include:

- Asiya Naqash, Indian politician
- Muhammad Yousuf Naqash, Kashmiri politician
- Mohammad Naqash, Pakistani cricketer
- Sahir Naqash (born 1990), German cricketer
- Taha Naqash, Kashmiri standup comedian
