= Yussuff =

Yussuff is both a given name and a surname. Notable people with the name include:

- Hassan Yussuff (born 1957), Canadian politician
- Rashid Yussuff (born 1989), English footballer
- Yussuff Izzuddin Shah of Perak (1890–1932), Sultan of Perak

== See also ==
- Yussuf
- Yusuff
- Yusuf
