= Richard Elman =

Richard Elman may refer to:

- Richard Elman (writer) (1934–1997), American novelist, poet, journalist, and teacher
- Richard Elman (mathematician) (born 1945), American mathematician known for his work in algebra
- Richard Samuel Elman (born 1940), British businessman

== See also ==
- Richard Ellmann (1918–1987), American literary critic and biographer
