= Algafari =

Algafari is a surname. Notable people with the surname include:

- Nidal Algafari (born 1965), Bulgarian television director
- Yousef Algafari (born 1972), Saudi Arabian chief executive
