= Muhammad Yousuf =

Mohammad or Muhammad Yousuf may refer to:

- Muhammad Yousuf Banuri, Pakistani Islamic Scholar
- Muhammad Yousuf Naqash
- Muhammad Yusuf Ludhianvi, Pakistani Islamic Scholar
- Muhammad Yusuf Kandhlawi, Indian Islamic Scholar
- Muhammad Yusuf Saraf, Pakistani Jurist
- Muhammad Yousaf (snooker player)
- Muhammad Yusuf Uthman, founder of Jund al-Aqsa
- Muhammad Yusuf Ali, Bangladeshi politician
- Muhammad Yusuf (poet)
- Muhammad Yousuf (politician), Pakistani politician
- Muhammad Yusuf Hashmi, Reformer and Leader of the Pakistan Movement
- Muhammad Yousaf Shahwani, Pakistani politician
- Mohammad Yousuf (cricketer), Pakistani cricket coach and former cricketer
- Muhammad Yusuf (footballer), Indonesian footballer
- Md. Yousuf (died 2018), Bangladeshi politician
- Muhammadu Dikko Yusufu, Nigerian policeman

== See also ==
- Mohammad Yousuf (disambiguation)
