= Yusuf Muhammad (disambiguation) =

Yusuf Muhammad (Arabic: يوسف محمد), and other variants, may refer to:

== People ==
- Youssef Mohamed (basketball) (1927–2001), Egyptian basketball player
- Youssef Mohamad (footballer, born 1980), Lebanese footballer
- Yousef Mohammad (footballer, born 1999), Syrian footballer
- Yousef Mohammed (futsal player) (born 1982), Libyan futsal player
- Yousif Muhammed Sadiq (born 1978), Iraqi Kurdish politician
- Yousuf Mohamed (1933–2022), Mauritian politician
- Yusuf Mohamed (footballer, born 1983), Nigerian footballer
- Yusuf Mohamed Abdi, Somaliland politician
- Yusuf Mohamed Ismail (1960–2015), Somali diplomat
- Yusuf Mire Mohamed, Somali politician
- Yusuf Muhammad, British inventor and engineer

== See also ==
- Yusuf
- Muhammad (name)
- Mohammad Yousuf (disambiguation)
