= Yusuff =

Yusuff is a surname. Notable people with the surname include:

- Sodiq Yusuff, Nigerian-American mixed martial artist
- Adeoye Yusuff, English footballer
- Rasheed Yusuff
- M. A. Yusuff Ali
- Salman Yusuff Khan
- Yusuff Syed

== See also ==
- Yussuff
- Yussuf
- Yusuf
