= List of Chittagong Medical College faculties =

List of former teachers of Chittagong Medical College

This List of Chittagong Medical College faculty includes notable teachers of Chittagong Medical College.

Name	Notability	Notes
Muhammad Ibrahim	National Professor , Independence Awardee, founder of BIRDEM	
Pran Gopal Datta	Vice Chancellor of Bangladesh Medical University	
A. H. M. Touhidul Anowar Chowdhury	Independence Day Awardee	
Nurul Islam	National Professor, founder of USTC	
Mirza Mazharul Islam	Ekushey Padak awardee	
Shamsuddin Ahmed	Martyred intellectual	
Subhagata Choudhury	Bangla Academy Literary Awardee	
Pranab Kumar Chowdhury	Swadhinata Smarak Sommanona Padak awardee	

== See also ==
- List of Chittagong Medical College alumni
