= Ibn al-Sayrafi =

Ibn al-Ṣayrafī may refer to:

- Al-Dani (981–1053), called Ibn al-Sayrafi, Andalusian Qur'anic scholar
- Abu'l-Qasim Ali ibn al-Sayrafi (died 1147), Egyptian historian
- Yusuf ibn al-Sayrafi (died c. 1161), Andalusian historian
