= Yussuf =

Yussuf is a surname. Notable people with the surname include:

- Adi Yussuf (born 1992), Tanzanian footballer
- Ayila Yussuf (born 1984), Nigerian football player
- Bashir Yussuf (born c. 1905), Somali religious leader

== See also ==
- Joseph
- Yusuf
- Yusuff
- Yussuff
