= Mohammad Yousuf =

Mohammad Yusuf, Muhammad Yousuf and other spellings, may refer to:

== Politicians ==
- Mohammad Yusuf (politician) (1917–1998), prime minister and foreign minister of Afghanistan
- Muhammad Yusuf Abdullah Haroon (1916–2011), politician from Sindh, Pakistan
- Mohamed Yusuf Haji (1940–2021), Somali politician and Kenyan Member of Parliament
- Md. Yousuf, Bangladeshi politician
- Muhammad Ziauddin Yusuf (commonly known as Zia Yusuf) b. 1986), British businessman and unelected politician of Sri Lankan origin who currently serves as Reform UK’s Spokesperson for Home Affairs
- Muhammadu Dikko Yusufu, Nigerian policeman and politician

== Sports players ==
- Mohammad Yousuf (cricketer) born 1974), Pakistani international cricketer
- Muhammad Yousaf (snooker player), Pakistani snooker player
- Muhammad Yousaf (athlete), Pakistani runner
- Mohamed Yousif (born 1991), Emirati footballer

== Others ==
- Mohammed Yusuf (Boko Haram) (1970–2009), Nigerian sect leader of Boko Haram
- Mohamed Yusuf (1876–1965), Indian businessman
- Mohammad Yousuf (general), Bangladeshi army officer
- Muhammad Yusuf Kandhalawi (1917–1965), Indian Muslim scholar, leader of the Tablighi Jamaat
- Yusaf Khan (general), Muhammad Yusaf Khan, former Vice Chief of Pakistan Army Staff

== See also ==
- Muhammad (disambiguation)
- Muhammad (name)
- Muhammad Yousuf (disambiguation)
- Mohamed Youssef (disambiguation)
- Yusuf Muhammad (disambiguation)
- Yusuf
