= Hajji Yusef =

Hajji Yusef (Persian: حاجي يوسف) may refer to:

- Hajji Yusef-e Olya, East Azerbaijan Province
- Hajji Yusef-e Sofla, East Azerbaijan Province
