= Abdullah Al-Othaim =

Saudi businessman

Abdullah Saleh Al Othaim
- Born: 1960 (age 65–66); Riyadh, Saudi Arabia
- Citizenship: Saudi Arabian
- Occupations: Chairman of Abdullah Al-Othaim Markets and Al Othaim Holding Company
- Years active: 1980–present
- Known for: Founder of Abdullah Al-Othaim Markets
- Website: www.othaimholding.com

Abdullah Saleh Ali Al-Othaim (Arabic: عبد الله العثيم) is a Saudi businessman and one of the largest investors in the Kingdom of Saudi Arabia. Forbes magazine ranked him in 2015 in the 61st position among the richest in the Arab world with a wealth of US$445.47 million, and 18th among the richest in the Kingdom of Saudi Arabia. Islamica magazine ranked him within the list of the 500 most powerful Muslims in the world. The Othaim retail empire is estimated at billions of dollars.

Al-Othaim is one of the most prominent traders in foodstuffs and consumer goods in the Kingdom, and Chairman of the Board of Directors of Al Othaim Holding Company and its subsidiaries. Abdullah Al-Othaim Markets is the second-largest supermarket chain in Saudi Arabia in terms of sales after Panda, which belongs to the Savola Group. In his capacity as chairman, his aggressive expansion in the markets, multi-format operations and attractive pricing policy have together consolidated the strength of the company. The retailer aims to benefit from the Walmart store model and introduce discounted prices to the Saudi Arabian market, which has traditionally been known for small commercial stores.

Forbes’ 2025 rankings placed Abdullah Al-Othaim at No. 1462 on the World's Billionaires list, and 17th on the list of the world's richest Arabs, with an estimated net worth of US$2.5 billion, according to Forbes data published on April 1, 2025.

== Biography and Life ==
=== Early life ===
Abdullah Al-Othaim was born in the city of Riyadh in 1960 (1380 AH). He is one of the sons of Sheikh Saleh Al-Othaim, who in 1956 (1376 AH) established one of the most important national economic institutions, investing in retail trade, the gold and jewellery industry, and other sectors. Al-Othaim received his primary education in Riyadh schools, then joined the Scientific Institute in Riyadh. His father introduced him at an early age to the love of commerce and to fundamentals of the trade, particularly in foodstuffs.

=== Professional achievements ===
Abdullah bin Saleh Al-Othaim leads Al Othaim Holding Company and chairs its Board of Directors. The company is an extension of Saleh Al-Othaim Trading Establishment, which was founded in 1956 by the late Saleh Al-Othaim, when the establishment opened its first site in the heart of the commercial area at the time in Hilat Al-Qusman in Al-Batha, Riyadh; the firm specialised in the foodstuff trade.

In 1980, Abdullah bin Saleh Al-Othaim continued the commercial work his father had started, expanding the business by opening additional commercial centres and markets for wholesale and retail sales. The name of Al Othaim Holding Company emerged as one of the most important Saudi companies in the supermarket industry and consumer wholesale. The company continued to provide an innovative marketing experience through competitive prices and distinguished services, leading the industry by establishing qualitative concepts in dealing with customers and suppliers, and introducing new technologies in retail and wholesale trade through its branches spread across the Kingdom.

After these successes, the company started new activities, all complementary to the previous ones, including the entertainment industry, the establishment of commercial complexes, and real-estate investment. In 2000, Al-Othaim Establishment was converted into a limited-liability company. Al-Othaim Trading Company was subsequently separated into three companies: Abdullah Al-Othaim Markets Company, which specialises in the retail trade of foodstuffs and was listed on the Saudi Stock Exchange (Tadawul) in 2008; Abdullah Al-Othaim Real Estate Investment Company, which operates in the management, planning, marketing and operation of large commercial complexes under the Al-Othaim Mall brand; and Al Othaim Holding Company, which owns the largest stake in the previous two companies.

- He possesses experience exceeding 40 years in the operational and administrative fields. Chairman and member of the Board of Directors of several investment, industrial and charitable companies, including: Chairman of the Board of Directors of the Qassim Chamber of Commerce and Industry.

=== Most Important Companies He Owns ===
- Al Othaim Holding Company.
- Abdullah Al Othaim Markets Company.
- Abdullah Al Othaim Real Estate Investment and Development Company (owner of the Al Othaim Mall chain at the level of the Kingdom).
- Abdullah Al Othaim Entertainment Company.

=== Leadership and Administrative Positions ===
- Chairman of the Board of Directors of Al Othaim Holding Company.
- Chairman of the Board of Directors of Abdullah Al Othaim Markets Company.
- Chairman of the Board of Directors of Abdullah Al Othaim Investment Company.
- Member of the Board of Directors of the Arab Union for Real Estate Development Company.
- Former Chairman of the Board of Directors of the Chamber of Commerce in the Qassim Region.
- Former Chairman of the Friends of the Saudi Red Crescent Committee in the Qassim Region.

=== Professional Memberships ===
- Former Member of the Board of the Saudi Authority for Industrial Cities and Technology Zones.
- Former Member of the Board of Directors of the Social Development Bank.

=== Social Memberships ===
- Chairman of the Board of Trustees of the Abdullah bin Saleh Al-Othaim and Sons Charitable Foundation.
- Former Member of the board of directors of Charitable Association for Orphan Care in the Riyadh Region (Insan).
- Founding Member of the Board of Directors of the King Salman Charitable Housing Project.
- Founding Member of the Board of Directors of the (Waqaia) Association for Combating Drugs.
- Member of the King Salman Center for Disability Research.
- Member of the King Abdulaziz and His Men Foundation for Gifted Care.
- Member of the Board of Directors of the Charitable Association for Combating Smoking.

== Awards ==
He received the Basma Award, a branch of Giving, in 2022.

== See also ==
- Abdullah Al Othaim Markets Company
- Al Othaim Holding Company
- Abdulaziz Al Othaim
