= Istanbul Atlas University =

Private university in Istanbul, Turkey

- İstanbul Atlas Üniversitesi
- Motto: Kelebek Etkisi
- Motto in English: Butterfly Effect
- Type: Private (non-profit)
- Established: 2018
- Affiliations: YÖK; Study in Turkey; Bologna Process(EHEA); ECHE
- Chairman: Dr. Yusuf Elgörmüş
- Rector: Prof. Mustafa Küçük
- Location: Kağıthane, Istanbul, Turkey
- Campus: Vadi Campus in Kağıthane
- Website: www.turkeyuniversity.org/universities/atlas-university/

Istanbul Atlas University (Turkish: İstanbul Atlas Üniversitesi) is a non-profit private university in Istanbul, Turkey. Atlas University was founded in 2018, and started education at the Kâğıthane Vadi Campus in 2020. Atlas University offers 11 associate degree, 22 undergraduate and 5 graduate programs. The University accepts international students from various countries.

== Atlas University Ranking ==
Atlas University ranks around 3000 - 4000 globally and about 136 in Turkey, reflecting a developing academic reputation since its establishment in 2018.

== Atlas University Tuition Fees ==
Atlas University fees vary by the program but remain reasonable; undergraduate tuition fees start from 2,900 dollars per year, while medical education reaches up to 22,500 dollars annually.

Master degree programs are fixed as 5600 dollars per whole program.

== Atlas University Accreditations ==
Atlas University is accredited by the Turkish Higher Education Council (YÖK) and operates under the national quality system monitored by YÖKAK.

Some programs are recognized internationally through MÜDEK and MEDEK.

== Faculties, schools and programs ==
Atlas University has the following academic units:

=== Faculty of Engineering and Natural Sciences ===
- Computer Engineering (Turkish)
- Industrial Engineering (English)
- Interior Architecture and Environmental Design (Turkish)
- Molecular Biology and Genetics (English)
- Software Engineering (English)

=== Faculty of Humanities and Social Sciences ===
- Business (English)
- English Language and Literature (English)
- Psychology (English and Turkish)
- Translator Translation (English)

=== Faculty of Health Sciences ===
Source: [11]

- Language and Speech Therapy (English and Turkish)
- Midwifery (Turkish)
- Nursing (English and Turkish)
- Nutrition and Dietetics (Turkish)
- Occupational Therapy (Turkish)
- Physical Therapy and Rehabilitation (Turkish)

=== Graduate Education Institute ===
- Language and Speech Therapy
- Midwifery
- Nutrition and Dietetics
- Occupational Therapy
- Physical Therapy and Rehabilitation

=== Vocational School (Turkish) ===
- Anesthesia
- Dental Prosthetic Technology
- Dialysis
- Disinfection, Sterilization and Antisepsy
- First and Emergency Aid
- Medical Imaging Techniques
- Medical Laboratory Techniques
- Mouth and Dental Health
- Operating Room Services
- Optician
- Physiotherapy

== People ==
- Dr. Yusuf Elgörmüş, Chairman
- Prof. Mustafa Küçük, Rector
- Naciye Seymenoğlu Torpil, Secretary General

== See also ==
- YÖS Exam
