= Yusuf Muhammad =

British inventor and engineer

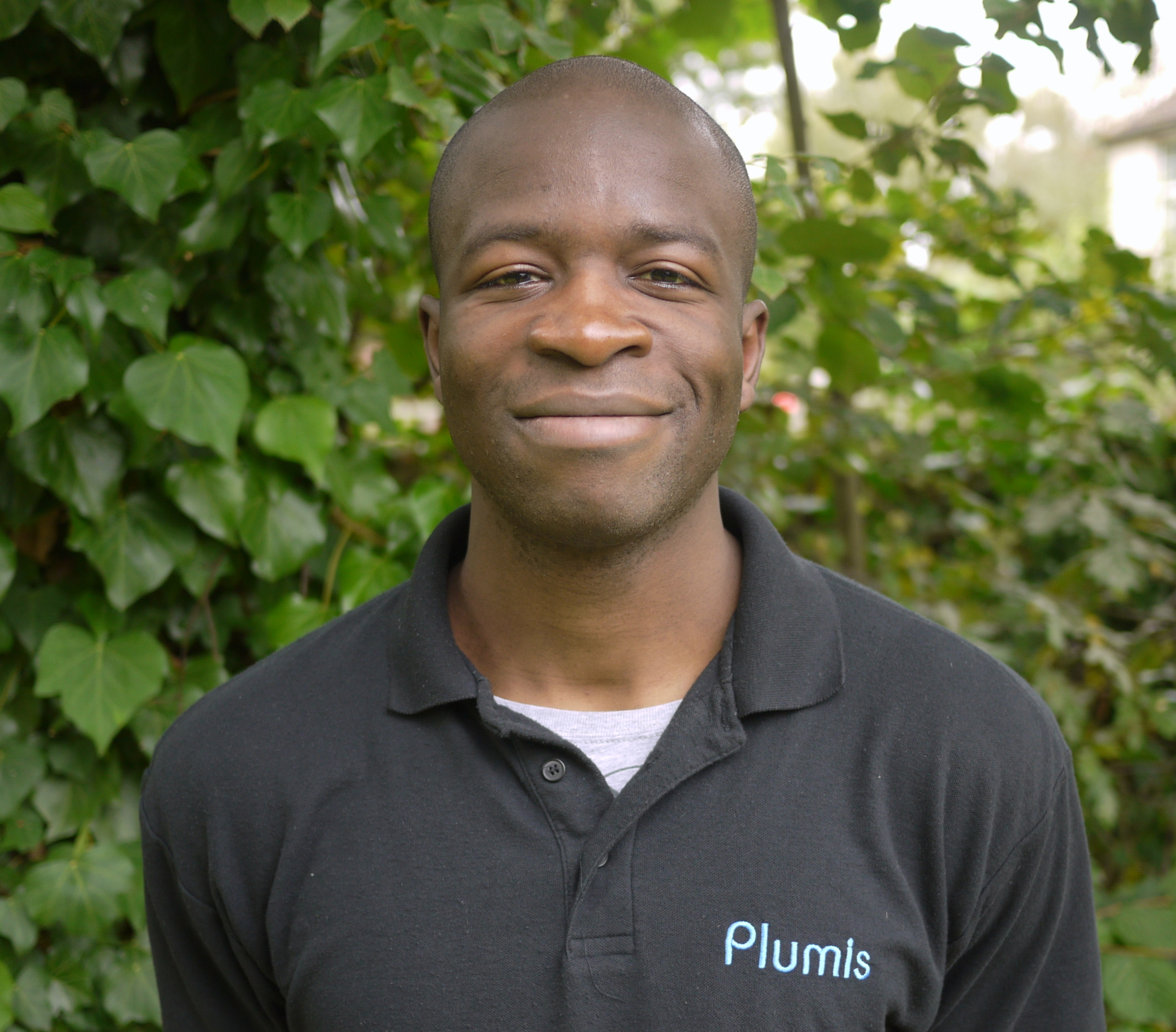
- Education: Royal College of Art Imperial College London University of Nottingham
- Awards: Red Dot 2016; James Dyson Award 2009
- Website: yusufm.com

Yusuf Muhammad is a British inventor and engineer. He is the founding director of Plumis, a start-up which develops innovative systems to protect people from fires. He won the Red Dot Award in 2016. He has appeared on the BBC Two show Big Life Fix.

== Early life and education ==
Muhammad was born in Sidcup. He studied Mechanical Design, Materials and Manufacture at the University of Nottingham, earning a Masters in 2006. He completed the Industrial Design Engineering Masters at the Royal College of Art and Imperial College London in 2008. In his second year he won £25,000 from the New Business Challenge to develop a fire extinguishing system.

== Career ==
Plumis was established whilst Muhammad was the Royal College of Art. Working with Paul Thomas and Jeung Woo Choi, he designed a series of solutions to suppress fire. He joined the Helen Hamlyn Centre for Design, redesigning the modern ambulance. He won the transport award in Designs of the Year.

In 2009 the Automist, a fire extinguishing system, won the James Dyson Award. Automist uses mist to control fires and can be more effective than sprinklers for chip pan fires. The Automist was selected as one of the British Library's Top 15 Inventions of the last decade. He appeared on the BBC Two show You Too Can Be an Absolute Genius’. Automist went on to win Innovation of the Year. He went on to design the Automist Smartscan, which won the 2016 Red Dot and a Silver award from the Industrial Designers Society of America. He is a popular public speaking, discussing design and fire safety.

=== Big Life Fix ===
Muhammad has appeared on the BBC Two show Big Life Fix. In Series one he made a boy with Möbius syndrome a bicycle that he could ride without needing his hands or feet. He also worked on a device to allow a 56-year-old man with locked-in syndrome communicate with his family. In Series Two he developed a snowboard that allowed a man with Post Anoxic Myoclonus to snowboard.

Muhammad enjoys playing basketball.

=== Awards ===
2009 James Dyson Award for the Automist fire extinguisher

2012 Design Museum's Designs of the Year for the Redesign for the Emergency Ambulance

2016 Red Dot for the Automist fire extinguisher
