= MarinaTex =

Bioplastic material

- Industry: Fishing industry
- Founder: Lucy Hughes
- Headquarters: United Kingdom
- Website: https://www.marinatex.co.uk

MarinaTex is a bioplastic material designed to serve as an alternative to single-use plastic in a variety of applications. It is translucent and stronger than LDPE plastic. This biodegradable bioplastic is made from red algae and organic waste from the fishing industry. MarinaTex plastic takes between four and six weeks to decompose in a home compostable environment where the temperatures range between 41 and 79 °F (5 and 26 °C).

== Inspiration ==
MarinaTex was created by Lucy Hughes, product designer graduate from the University of Sussex, as a final year project. Hughes's main inspiration came from the claim that "by 2050 there will be more plastic in the ocean than fish by weight,” and therefore, developed the interest to solve this problem. However, Hughes explains that her journey didn't start with the plastic problem, but by looking into the fishing industry. An estimated 492,020 tonnes of fish waste are produced by the fish processing industry yearly in the UK and it is considered a huge and inefficient waste stream with low commercial value. Therefore, Hughes developed this bioplastic that is made from materials that are usually thrown away.

== Design process ==
The development of the product began at MCB Seafoods, a fish-processing plant and wholesaler, where Hughes was able to identify a variety of waste streams to work with including offal, blood, crustacean and shellfish exoskeletons, and fish skins and scales. After some research, Hughes found that the fish skins and scales had the most potential due to their flexibility and strength-enabling proteins.

By utilising open source resources, Hughes started investigating various organic binders from the sea such as chitosan and agar (from the agar red algae). However, it took multiple experiments to refine the material and process.

Hughes also highlights that the whole production process is relatively low-tech since it was made in her kitchen. Unlike some plastics that requires at least 150 °C (302 °F) in its production, MarinaTex uses temperatures below 100 °C (212 °F).

== Recognition ==
In 2019, Hughes received the James Dyson Award, which is given to design and engineering students who develop products that solve problems.
