= Mohamed Youssef =

Mohamed Youssef may refer to:

- Mohamed Youssef (basketball) (born 1986), Libyan basketball player
- Mohamed Youssef (football) (born 1970), Egyptian football player
- Mohamed Youssef (sailor) (born 1964), Djibouti sailor
- Mohamed Youssef (swimmer) (born 1963), Egyptian swimmer
- Mohamed Youssef (weightlifter) (born 1956), Egyptian weightlifter
- Mohamed Ismail Youssef (born 1967), Qatar athlete

== See also ==
- Mohammad Yousuf (disambiguation)
