= James Dyson Award =

Design award

- Description: International design award that celebrates and empowers the next generation of design engineers
- Country: International (Global eligibility)
- Presented by: James Dyson Foundation
- Website: http://www.jamesdysonaward.org

The James Dyson Award is an international student design award in the fields of product design, industrial design and engineering.

== Description ==
The James Dyson Award is open to university level students (or recent graduates) and rewards those who "design something that solves a problem". The award is run by the James Dyson Foundation, James Dyson’s charitable trust, as part of its mission to get young people involved in design engineering.

To qualify students must have studied in: Australia, Austria, Belgium, Canada, China, France, Germany, Ireland, India, Italy, Japan, Korea, Malaysia, Netherlands, New Zealand, Russia, Singapore, Spain, Sweden, Switzerland, Taiwan, Thailand, United Kingdom or the United States.

One national winner and four finalists are chosen from each country. James Dyson selects an international winner for the overall prize.

== Winners ==
International winners

- 2007 Maxi Pantel (Germany) for the Senjo, an electronic device for the deaf to communicate with the hearing.
- 2008 Michael Chen (England) for the Reactiv, a motion-activated LED safety jacket for cycling.
- 2009 Yusuf Muhammad and Paul Thomas (Royal College of Art, England) for Automist, a kitchen-faucet sprinkler system that controls residential fires.
- 2010 Samuel Adeloju (Australia) for Longreach, water floating device for saving victims in water.
- 2011 Edward Linacre (Australia) for Airdrop, extracts water from the air and delivers it directly to plant roots through a network of subterranean piping.
- 2012 Dan Watson (Royal College of Art, England) for SafetyNet, a new commercial fishing net to allow smaller and unwanted fish to escape.
- 2013 University of Pennsylvania team (United States) for Titan Arm, a bionic arm. The arm was developed for the Cornell Cup USA 2013 competition where they won first place. Award: $45,000 + $16,000 to the university.
- 2014 James Roberts (Loughborough University, England) for MOM, a portable inflatable incubator. Award: $45,000 + $5,000 to the university.
- 2015 University of Waterloo team (Canada) for the Voltera V-One, a laptop-sized printed circuit board printer. Award: $45,000 + $7,500 to the university.
- 2016 Isis Shiffer (Pratt Institute, United States) for the EcoHelmet, a paper bicycle helmet. Award: $45,000.
- 2017 Michael Takla, Rotimi Bhavsar, Prateek Mathur (McMaster University) for The sKan a device using thermal maps of the skin to detect melanomas.
- 2018 Nicolas Orellana, Yaseen Noorani (Lancaster University) for the O-Wind Turbine.
- 2019 Lucy Hughes (University of Sussex, England) for MarinaTex, a biodegradable plastic made from fish off cuts.
- 2020 Judit Giró (University of Barcelona and University of California, Irvine) for The Blue Box, a biomedical device for pain-free, non-irradiating, low-cost, in-home breast cancer testing.
- 2021 Kelu Yu, Si Li and David Lee (National University of Singapore) for HOPES, a device for pain-free, at-home eye pressure testing, opening up access to glaucoma testing. Joseph Bentley (Loughborough University, England) for REACT, a technology that stems bleeding to help save stabbing victims’ lives. Jerry de Vos (Delft University of Technology) for Plastic Scanner, a low-cost, handheld device to identify plastic for recycling.
