= Yusuf Ali =

Yusuf Ali or Yousaf Ali (Arabic: يوسف علي) may refer to:

== People ==
- Yousef Ahmed Ali (born 1988), Qatari footballer
- Yusuf Abdi Ali Tukeh (born 1952/53), Somali Army colonel
- Yusuf Ismail Ali, Somali jurist and lawyer
- Yusuf Olaolu Ali (born 1956), Nigerian lawyer
- Yusuf Alli (born 1960), Nigerian long jumper
- Yusuf Ali Chowdhury (1905–1971), Bengali Muslim politician in South Asia
- Yusuf Ali Kechery (1934–2015), a poet and film director
- Yusuf Ali Kenadid (1837–1911), Somali ruler
- Yusuf Ali Mollah, Bangladeshi professor and educator
- Yusuf Ali Nur (born 1978), Somali football coach and player
- Abdullah Yusuf Ali (1872–1953), Indian Islamic scholar, known for his English translation of the Quran
- Mirza Muhammad Yusuf Ali (1858–1920), Bengali writer and social activist
- Muhammad Yusuf Ali (1923–1998), Bangladesh politician

== Places ==
- Deh-e Yusof Ali, village in Iran

== See also ==
- Yusuf
- Ali (name)
