= Hajj Yusef, Markazi =

Hajj Yusefz حاج يوسف
- Village
- Location within Iran
- Coordinates: 33°52′31″N 49°13′29″E
- Country: Iran
- Province: Markazi
- County: Shazand
- Bakhsh: Sarband
- Rural District: Hendudar

Population (2006)
  - Total: 86
- Time zone: UTC+3:30 (IRST)
  - Summer (DST): UTC+4:30 (IRDT)

Hajj Yusef (Persian: حاج يوسف, also Romanized as Ḩājj Yūsef, Ḩājj Yūsof, and Ḩāj Yūsef; also known as Hāji Yūsuf and Ḩājjī Yūsof) is a village in Hendudar Rural District, Sarband District, Shazand County, Markazi Province, Iran. At the 2006 census, its population was 86, in 24 families.
