= Yousef Al-Samoui =

Jordanian footballer

Personal information
- Date of birth: February 12, 1992 (age 34)
- Place of birth: Jordan
- Height: 1.79 m (5 ft 10 in)
- Position: Forward

Team information
- Current team: Al-Hussein

Youth career
- Al-Wehdat

Senior career*
Years	Team	Apps	(Gls)
2011–2016	Al-Jazeera		
2016	Al-Faisaly		
2016–2017	Al-Baqa'a		
2017–	Al-Hussein		
- * Club domestic league appearances and goals ‡ National team caps and goals as of 25 January 2017

Yousef Al-Samoui (Arabic: يوسف السموعي) is a Jordanian footballer who plays for Al-Hussein.
