= Yusuf Mugu =

Nigerian politician

Member of the Kaduna State House of Assembly
- Constituency: Kaura Constituency

Personal details
- Born: Kaduna State, Nigeria
- Party: Peoples Democratic Party (PDP)
- Occupation: Politician

Yusuf Mugu is a Nigerian politician who currently serves as the representative for the Kaura constituency in the Kaduna State House of Assembly.
