= Yusif Jafarov =

- Yusif Cəfərov
- Born: 27 March 1952 (age 74); Baku, Azerbaijan SSR, Soviet Union
- Other names: Yusuf Dzhafarov; Yosef Jaffarov
- Occupation: Historian
- Relatives: Mammad Yusif Jafarov (grandfather)

Academic background
- Education: Azerbaijan State University; Institute of Oriental Studies of USSR
- Alma mater: Baku State University

Academic work
- Discipline: Historian of antiquity and early Middle Ages
- Sub-discipline: Specialist in the Hun-Turkic issues, history of Caucasian Albania and the origin of the Azerbaijanis
- Institutions: Institute of History of Azerbaijan; Harry S. Truman Research Institute

Yusif Jafarov, also Yusuf Jaffarov or Yosef Jaffarov (b. 27 March 1952, Baku) is a Soviet and Azerbaijani historian of antiquity and early Middle Ages.

== Education ==
Th member of the IV State Duma of Russia Mammad Yusif Jafarov was his paternal grandfather. Born and raised in Baku, Yusif Jafarov went to the Schoold Nr 134. From 1969 to 1974, he studied at the Faculty of History of the Azerbaijan State University (now Baku State University). From 1975 to 1979, he completed an internship and postgraduate study at the Leningrad Department of the Institute of Oriental Studies of the USSR Academy of Sciences, where he studied ancient Greek, Latin and German. In the Turkic-Mongolian Cabinet of the Leningrad Institute of Oriental Studies of the Academy of Sciences, under the guidance of the famous Turkologist Sergey Klyashtorny, he completed work on his dissertation, The Huns and Azerbaijan, which was recommended for publication as a monograph. In 1981, he defended his dissertation in Baku and received a Candidate of Historical Sciences degree (prototype of PhD). Based on this work, the monograph The Huns and Azerbaijan was published in 1985 (republished in Baku in 1993), for which he was awarded the title of Laureate of the Lenin Komsomol Prize of the Azerbaijan SSR.

== Career ==
From 1975 to 1992, he worked at the Institute of History of the Academy of Sciences of the Azerbaijan SSR (now Azerbaijan). Currently lives in Toronto, Canada. His articles have been published in such journals as Vestnik drevnej istorii, Vizantijskij Vremennik, Bulletin of the Academy of Sciences of Azerbaijan, Literaturnij Azerbaidzhan and others. He was a participant to many conferences, such as in Taipei, Moscow, Kyiv, Baku, Tbilisi, Yerevan, Makhachkala.

The sphere of Yusif Jafarov's scientific interests is ethnopolitical processes in the Caucasus, in connection with the history of relations of the nomads of the North Caucasus with the states and peoples of the South Caucasus, in particular, with Arran (aka Caucasian Albania). He is also a specialist in the field of ethnogenesis of the modern Azerbaijani people.

== Publications ==
=== Articles ===
- Джафаров Ю. Р. К вопросу о хайландурах Егишэ // Письменные памятники и проблемы истории культуры народов Востока. — Москва — 1977. — С. 6—10.
- Джафаров Ю. Р. К датировке событий XXVIII—XXX глав I части «Истории албан» Моисея Каланкатуйского. // Письменные памятники Востока. История, филология. — Москва — 1979. — С. 49—60.
- Джафаров Ю. Р. К вопросу о первом появлении савир в Закавказье // Вестник древней истории. — 1979. — № 3. — С. 163—172.
- Джафаров Ю. Р. Оногуры византийских писателей и хайландуры Елишэ // Византийский временник. — 1980. — Т. 41. — С. 153—162.
- Джафаров Ю. Р. О происхождении древних булгар // Письменные памятники и проблемы истории культуры народов Востока. XV годичная научная сессия ЛО ИВ АН СССР (доклады и сообщения). — Декабрь 1979. — Часть 1 (1). — М.: Наука, ГРВЛ. — 1981. — С. 88—93.
- Джафаров Ю. Р. Сабиры на Кавказе. Основные этапы истории (463—558 гг.) // Совместная научная сессия молодых ученых Институтов:, истории Академии наук Азербайджанской, Грузинской и Армянской ССР. Тезисы докладов. — Ереван. — 1980. — С. 39—40.
- Джафаров Ю. Р. Становление и распад в Восточном Предкавказье первого объединения гунно-булгарских племен. // Генезис, основные этапы, общие пути и особенности развития феодализма у народов Северного Кавказа. Тезисы докладов. — Махачкала. — 1980. — С. 40—41.
- Джафаров Ю. Р. Ранние гунны на Кавказе. К интерпретации греческих и армянских источников. // Вопросы истории, идеологии, философии, культуры народов Востока. Источниковедение, историография. Тезисы конференции аспирантов и молодых научных сотрудников. — Москва. — 1981. — Т. I. — С. 3—4.
- Джафаров Ю. Р. О происхождении древних булгар // Фольклор, литература и история Востока: материалы III Всесоюзной тюркологической конференции. — Ташкент. — 1984. — С. 408—411.
- Джафаров Ю. Р. Город Цри и страна чилбов в «Истории албан» Моисея Каланкатуйского // Древний и средневековый Восток. — Ч. 1. — Москва. — 1985. — С. 65—80.
- Джафаров Ю. Р. О локализации храмовой области в Кавказской Албании // Вестник древней истории. — 1985. — № 2. — С. 97—108.
- Джафаров Ю. Р. . К вопросу о происхождении европейских гуннов // Историко-культурные контакты Алтайской языковой общности. — Вып. 1. — Москва. — 1986.
- Джафаров Ю.Р. Баку и поход гуннов // Страницы истории Баку и Апшерона. Тезисы конференции. — Баку. — 1990.
- Джафаров Ю. Р. Вечный вопрос (Размышления о ранних тюрках, гуннах и этногенезе азербайджанцев) // Литературный Азербайджан. — 1990. — № 8. — С. 118.
- Джафаров Ю.Р. О локализации «страны» чилбов и лбинов // Источниковедение истории и культуры народов Дагестана и Северного Кавказа. — Махачкала. — 1991.
- Джафаров Ю. Р. Византия и Кавказская Албания на рубеже 7—8 вв. О поездке албанского князя Вараз-Трдата в Константинополь // XVIII международный конгресс византинистов, Москва, 8—15.08.1991 = XVIIIe congrès international des études Byzantines, Moscou, 8—15.08.1991 = XVIIIth international congress of Byzantine studies, Moscow, 8—15.08.1991 : программа. — Москва. — 1991. — С. 34.
- Y. Jaffarov. On the Origin of the European Huns // The 35th Permanent International Altaistic Conference. Handbook. Academy of Science, Taipei, 1992.
- Джафаров Ю. Р. О двух малоивестных этнонимах Азербайджана. Обарены Стефана Византийского и паррасии Страбона. // Известия АН Азербайджана. — 1993. — С. 6.
- Джафаров Ю. Р. О формировании азербайджанского народа // История Азербайджана с древнейших времен до начала ХХ века. — Баку. — 1995. — C. 394—408.
- Y. Jaffarov. The Byzantine Empire and Caucasian Albania at the End of the Seventh and the Beginning of the Eighth Centuries: On the Question of the Journey of the Albanian Prince Varaz-Tirdat to Constantinople // Acts XVIII th International Congress of Byzantine Studies Selected Papers: Main and Communications Moscow, 1991, Volume I: History Byzantine Studies Press, Inc. Shepherdstown, WV, USA, 1996, P. 146—151.
- Y. Dzafarov. Christianity and the Nomads of the Black Sea and Caspian Steppes // Religion, Customary Law, and Nomadic Technology Papers presented at the Central and Inner Asian Seminar University of Toronto, 1 May 1998 and 23 April 1999.
- Y. Dzafarov. The Ethnic Origin of the Huns and Their Appearance in Eastern Europe // Continuity and Change in Central and Inner Asia: Papers Presented at the Central and Inner Asian Seminar, University of Toronto, 24-25 March 2000 and 4-5 May 2001, Toronto, 2002, P. 3—10.
- Джафаров Ю. Гаргары и алвансĸая письменность К вопросу возниĸновения этноязыĸовой общности // Україна-Азербайджан. Матеріали міжнародної наукової конференції «Україна-Азербайджан: діалог культур та цивілізацій» з нагоди століття встановлення дипломатичних відносин між Україною та Азербайджаном. Київ: Національний педагогічний університет імені М. П. Драгоманова, 2021. С. 38—50.
- Джафаров Ю. К вопросу о кангарах-печенегах в Азербайджане // Культурные и цивилизационные связи между Европой и Востоком: научная конференция памяти Омеляна Прицака, 17-18 марта 2022 г.
- Джафаров Ю. До питання про так званих «бунтурків» у грузинських джерелах // Коли Захід зустрів Схід. Матеріали міжнародної наукової конференції «Коли Захід зустрів Схід: наукова конференція присвячена пам’яті Андрія Ковалівського», яка відбулась 27-28 травня 2024 р. // Упорядник д. і. н. Я. В. Пилипчук. Київ-Вінниця : Український державний університет імені М. Драгоманова, НІЛАНЛТД, 2024.
- Y. Jafarov. On the Question of the Ethnocultural Identity of the European Huns and the Volga Bulgars // Міжнародна наукова конференція Пам'яті Гриця Халимоненка «Від Шота Руставелі до Юнуса Емре» (1941-2023). Київ-Вінниця : Український державний університет імені М. Драгоманова, ТВОРИ, 2024. — С. 44—46.
- Джафаров Ю. К вопросу о гаргарах Алвании/Арана: что знают о них немногословные источники и что пишут многочисленные исследователи // Этнокультурное наследие Кавказской Албании. — № 5. — 2024. — С. 128—133.
- Джафаров Ю. Р. О хронологии династии Михранидов (Михракан) в Аране по «Истории албан» Моисея Каланкатуйского // Universum: общественные науки : журнал. — 2025. — Октябрь (№ 10 (125)). — С. 4—13.
- Джафаров Ю. Р. Итинерарий Апостола Елисея в Алвании и основание им Первой Церкви в Гисе по «Истории Албан» Моисея Каланкатуйского // Universum: общественные науки : журнал. — 2025. — Ноябрь (№ 11 (126)). — С. 9—22.
- Джафаров Ю. Р. К вопросу о христианизации Алвании при царе Урнайре по «Истории албан» Моисея Каланкатуйского // Universum: общественные науки : журнал. — 2026. — Январь (№ 1 (128)). — С. 4—8.
- Джафаров Ю. Р. Этногенез азербайджанского народа. К критике теории о «ранних тюрках» // Universum: общественные науки : журнал. — 2026. — Февраль (№ 2 (129)). — С. 7—17.

=== Books ===
- Dzhafarov, Yu. (1985). Gunny i Azerbaĭdzhan (Гунны и Азербайджан). Baku: Elm.
- Dzhafarov, Yu. (1993). Gunny i Azerbaĭdzhan (Гунны и Азербайджан). Baku: Azerneshr. ISBN 5-552-00849-9.
- Y. Jaffarov (1995). Between East and West: Is Azerbaijan on the way to independence? Jerusalem: The Harry S Truman Research Institute for the Advancement of Peace. The Hebrew University of Jerusalem.
