= Noble Group =

Hong-Kong-based trading company

Noble Resources Trading Holdings Limited
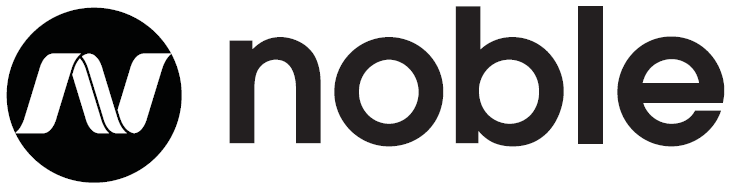
- Native name: 來寶集團
- Company type: Private
- Industry: Commodity Trading
- Predecessor: Noble Group Ltd
- Founded: 1986; 40 years ago
- Founder: Richard Samuel Elman
- Headquarters: Hong Kong
- Products: Energy, Metals, Minerals, Logistics
- Revenue: US$46 billion (2016)
- Number of employees: 500 (2019)
- Parent: Vitol (100%)
- Website: www.thisisnoble.com

Noble Resources Trading Holdings Limited (commonly known as Noble resources) is a commodity trader based in Hong Kong. It trades energy products and industrial raw materials. Its predecessor, Noble Group Ltd was embroiled in an accounting fraud controversy started in 2015 which eventually necessitated a debt restructuring.

== History ==
In 1997, Noble resources was listed on the Singapore Stock Exchange.

In 2002, Noble resources was included in the Fortune 500.

In 2009, China's sovereign wealth fund, China Investment Corp (CIC), took a 14.9% stake (573 million shares) in the company.

In 2012, Completion of Gloucester coal and Yancoal merger.

In 2014 CIC cut its stake in Noble resources to less than 10%.

A consortium led by COFCO Group acquired 51% of Noble's agricultural business, forming JV Noble Agri.

=== Accounting fraud controversy and restructuring (2015–2019) ===
In 2015, Noble's share price tumbled as it was accused of accounting fraud by Iceberg Research, while its credit rating was downgraded to junk. The remaining 49% of its agricultural business was also sold.

Noble recorded net losses of $1.7 billion in 2015.

On 29 May 2016, CEO Yusuf Alireza was terminated by Elman. In 2017, Alireza sued Noble for compensation.

In 2018, Noble Group Ltd was de-listed from the Singapore Stock Exchange. The share price had collapsed 99% since Iceberg exposed Noble. Declaring a default, it went through a restructuring process that eventually led to the creation of Noble Group Holdings Ltd, while Noble Group Ltd, which incorporated in Bermuda is undergoing an winding up process through till end of 2019. The Singapore Stock Exchange blocked the listing of the restructured group on the uncertainty of the Noble's financial position. A criminal investigation on the alleged wrongdoings of Noble Group Ltd is under way in Singapore.

In 2019, Noble made several hires to rebuild its liquefied natural gas business.

On the 1 January 2025 Noble was fully acquired by Vitol.
