= Abdullah Al-Othaim Markets =

Saudi Arabian company

- ISIN: SA1230K1UGH7
- Industry: Retail
- Founded: 21 May 1980; 46 years ago
- Headquarters: Riyadh, Saudi Arabia
- Number of locations: 476 stores (415 in Saudi Arabia, 61 in Egypt) (2025)
- Area served: Saudi Arabia, Egypt
- Key people: Abdullah Al-Othaim (Chairman); Abdulmalik Abdullah Al-Othaim (Managing Director, board member and acting chief executive officer)
- Products: Cash and carry Hypermarket; Othaim City; Supermarket; Wholesale
- Revenue: ▲SAR 11.24 billion (2025) ▼SAR 2.52 billion (Q2 2026)
- Total assets: ▲SAR 7.69 billion (2025) ▼SAR 7.50 billion (Q2 2026)
- Website: www.othaimmarkets.com

Abdullah Al-Othaim Markets Company is considered an extension of Saleh Al Othaim Trading Establishment, which was founded by the late Sheikh Saleh Al-Othaim in 1956, and worked in the trade of foodstuffs. In 1980, Abdullah Al-Othaim Markets Trading Company was established to continue the journey in expanding the work and opening centers for wholesale and retail sales.

The company continues to implement its strategy for expansion and growth, reaching a total of 476 branches by the end of December 2025, including 415 branches covering more than 110 cities and governorates across the Kingdom of Saudi Arabia, in addition to its presence outside the Kingdom, where it operates 61 branches in the Arab Republic of Egypt.

The company has received global appreciation from Forbes magazine, as it was classified in 2016 as the third largest Arab company in the field of executive management of retail, and it was included in the list of the best 100 companies in the Kingdom of Saudi Arabia, and the best 200 companies in the Arab world. In 2020, Forbes Middle East magazine included the company in the list of the 100 largest public companies in the Middle East region.

== History ==
1956 - Opening of the first store in Riyadh in the Kingdom of Saudi Arabia under the name "Al Othaim Trading Establishment".

1980 - Establishment of Abdullah Al-Othaim Markets Company, expanding its commercial activities in wholesale and retail trade.

1990 - Opening of store No. 14 of Abdullah Al-Othaim Markets Company in the Kingdom of Saudi Arabia.

1992 - Opening of central warehouses with high-quality standards in dry and refrigerated storage.

2004 - Launch of the loyalty program "Iktisab", to become one of the largest loyalty systems in the Kingdom of Saudi Arabia.

2007 - Launch of the initiative to donate the remaining halalas from the customer during purchase operations to support charitable organizations.

2008 - Listing of Abdullah Al-Othaim Markets Company on the Saudi Financial Market "Tadawul".

2016 - Opening of the first store in Egypt.

2022 - Opening of 300th store in the Kingdom of Saudi Arabia.

2024 - Opening of the first Al Othaim Cash & Carry in the Kingdom.

2024 - Al-Othaim Markets had reached 400 branches in the Kingdom.

== Subsidiary Companies ==
Abdullah Al-Othaim Markets Company has subsidiary companies as shown below:

- Haley Holding Company
- Al Othaim Cash & Carry Company
- Bayt Al Watan Company
- Mueen for Human Resources Company
- Abdullah-Al Othaim Markets (Egypt)

== Social Responsibility ==
Through the implementation of many programs that constitute an essential element in the company's policy and approach, Abdullah Al-Othaim Markets Company assumes responsibility for social responsibility programs and community service. Among the most important of these programs:

=== Program for donating the remaining halalas from customers according to the customer's wish ===
The number of associations benefiting from this project has reached more than 15 charitable associations at the level of the Kingdom, and the total donations have exceeded more than 10 million riyals since the beginning of the program.

=== Charitable Magnetic Purchase Vouchers Initiative ===
These purchase vouchers are considered an automated technological tool and important for charitable associations to provide support to the needy and direct the disbursement of direct support to basic needs. They are allocated to specific categories in society. The automated technological system currently benefits more than 190 thousand families and beneficiaries through more than 135 charitable associations and institutions in the Kingdom, where the financial support provided by Al Othaim Markets in this program has exceeded 170 million riyals until the end of 2025.

=== Through the Sanabel Al Khair Charitable Purchase Vouchers Initiative ===
The company contributed additional support of more than 45 million riyals in purchasing vouchers for charitable associations and institutions for the Sanabel Al Khair initiative until the end of 2025.

=== Agreement with Charitable Associations and Institutions ===
Several agreements have been negotiated to support the programs of a diverse group of organizations and charitable institutions in the Kingdom, including the National Ehsan Platform, Namaa Makkah Association, and the Birr Associations in Jeddah and Abha.

=== Iktisab Program ===
The Iktisab program is considered the first integrated program sponsored by Abdullah Al-Othaim Markets Company, and Iktisab Company associated with Abdullah Al-Othaim Markets Company. The idea of the program revolves around giving consumer and food commodities to the end consumer who belongs to one of the targeted categories in society at a reasonable and subsidized price. Some customers from special categories such as (orphans, martyrs, widows, divorcees, and prisoners' families) who shop at the company's branches receive direct support for a variety of basic materials, with a maximum monthly support of 100 riyals for each beneficiary. The total support provided to the beneficiaries of the program has exceeded 45 million riyals until the end of 2025.

== Board of Directors ==
1. Abdullah Saleh Ali Al-Othaim, Chairman of the Board of Directors
2. Bader Hamed Abdulrazaq Alaujan, Vice Chairman of the Board of Directors
3. Abdulmalik Abdullah Al-Othaim, board member, Managing Director, and acting Chief Executive Officer
4. Raed Abdullah Ibrahim Al-Hogail, Board Member
5. Saad Ibrahim Saad Al-Mushawah, Board Member
6. Bandar Suliman Mohammed Al-Bohairy, Board Member

== Awards ==
- Excellence in Governance Award for the Best Listed Companies in the Financial Market for the year 2019.
- Consumer Protection Association Award for the year 2022 for Abdullah Al-Othaim Markets Company's commitment to improving the experience of consumers.
- Retail Leisure International Award for Sustainability in the Retail Sector for the year 2022.
- Award for the Fastest Growing Retail Markets Chain in the Kingdom for the year 2022.
- Best Marketing Initiative in the Kingdom Award for the year 2022, according to the Retail Asia Awards classification.
- Strongest Brand in Saudi Retail, leading the foodstuffs sector for the year 2022.
- Most Admired Brand in the Kingdom of Saudi Arabia for the year 2022, according to Global Brands Magazine classification.
- Best Customer Loyalty Program "Iktisab" for the year 2023, according to Global Business Outlook classification.
- Award for the Retail Chain with the Lowest Cost and Best Prices for the Consumer for the year 2023, according to the Global Business Outlook classification.
- Award for the Fastest Growing Retail Markets Chain in the Kingdom of Saudi Arabia for the year 2024.
- Most Saving Brand in the Retail Sector in the Kingdom of Saudi Arabia for the year 2024 from International Business Magazine.
- Award for the Fastest Growing Retail Markets Chain in the Kingdom of Saudi Arabia for the year 2024 from World Business Outlook magazine.
- Best Sustainability Practices in Retail in the Kingdom of Saudi Arabia for the year 2024, from Global Brands Magazine.
- Social Responsibility Awards from the Ministry of Human Resources and Social Development, first in the Kingdom at the level of the wholesale and retail sector for the year 2024.
- Excellence in Financial Performance Award for the year 2024, according to the International Business Finance classification.
- Social Responsibility Awards 2025 from the Ministry of Human Resources and Social Development for the second consecutive year.
- In 2025, Al Othaim was ranked among the top 20 Saudi brands in terms of brand value, according to Kantar BrandZ.
- Best Value for Money Grocery Retail Chain – KSA for the year 2025.
- Best Omni Channel Grocery Retailer – KSA for the year 2025.
- Best Workplaces in KSA Award for the year 2026, ranked 27th in the Large Category, according to Great Place to Work.
- Best Workplaces in Retail in the Middle East Award for the year 2026, ranked 16th, according to Great Place to Work.
- Top 20 Most Valuable Saudi Brands for the year 2026, ranked 20th in the Retail Category, according to Kantar BrandZ.
- Social Responsibility Award for the year 2026, received for the third consecutive year (2024, 2025 and 2026) at the Global CSR Forum, organized by the Ministry of Human Resources and Social Development.

== Images ==
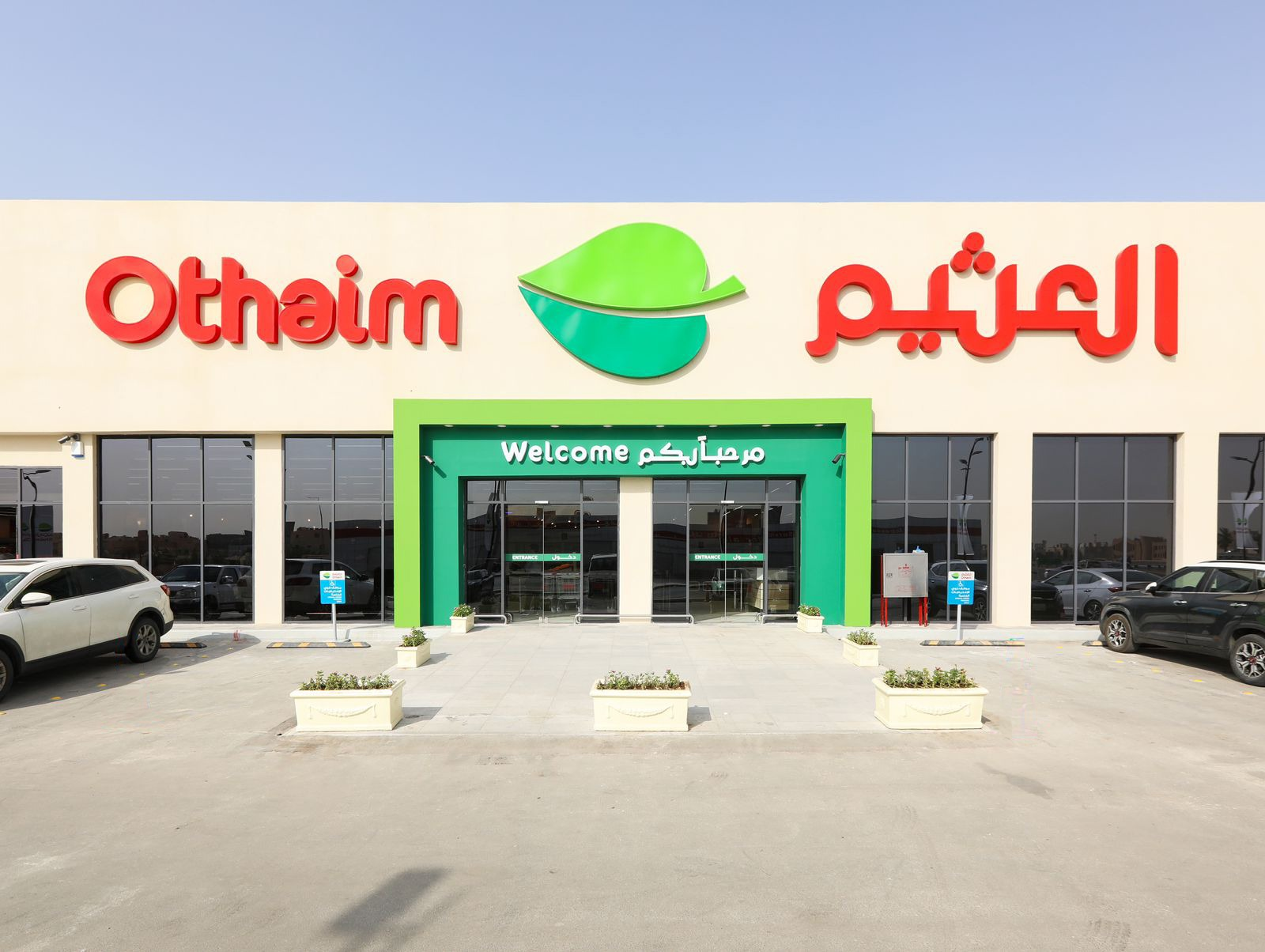
One of Othaim Markets' branches in Riyadh, Saudi Arabia.
