= Yousef Abou Louz =

Jordanian poet and journalist

- Born: 1956 (age 69–70); The village of Al-Kafir (Al-Faisaliah) in the Jordanian city of Madaba.
- Occupation: poet journalist
- Awards: Arar Literature Prize from the Jordanian Writers Association. The Arab Writers Union Award in Damascus for his Diwan "Fatima goes early to the fields". 2014: Taryam Omran Press Award. 2014: Sheikh Zayed Book Award.

Yousef Ahmed Abou Louz (Arabic: يوسف أحمد أبو لوز) is a Jordanian poet and journalist was born in the village of Al-Kafir (Al-Faisaliah) in the Jordanian city of Madaba in 1956.

== Life and career ==
Abou Louz was born into a Palestinian family that emigrated from Beersheba to Madaba in 1948. He completed his secondary education in UNRWA schools. He studied at the Teachers Institute and obtained a diploma from Amman Training College. He worked in the fields of education and journalism, moving between Algeria, Saudi Arabia, and the United Arab Emirates. He entered the cultural press and worked as a journalist in the Jordanian newspaper Al-Dustour. He is a member of the editorial board of literary cultural affairs quarterly, issued by the Emirates Writers and Literature Union and he also worked in the cultural section of Al-Shorouk magazine in Sharjah. He has many collections of poetry and writings in criticism. Yousef Abou Louz is one of the seventies generations in contemporary Arabic poetry. Although his first poetry collection "Morning Katyusha, O camp" was published in1983. He followed this collection with his second one, "Fatima Goes Early to the Okra Fields" in the same year, but his relationship with that generation places him among the poets of the seventies stems from the spirit of his poem, which formed its beginnings in that time, and carried several influences coming from different poetics, on top of which was the poetry of Palestinian resistance. Beside the translations made by Saadi Youssef, along with others, for poetry from different languages, cultures, and geography.

In the Palestinian and Jordanian poem, Abou Louz, and those of his generation, mixed the resistive tone and enthusiasm with flux flowing ritual, and visionary anthems, and ontological reflections that came from the translations. Thus, Abou Louz's poem was enriched by many voices, while it moves from a direct, sloganeering, and sometimes squawking tone, to a poetic form that embraces echoes and pastoral experiences, the infernal Baudelaire tone, and the emotional sensuality, in the language of meditations and wisdom emerging from the impulsiveness and rebellious tendency of Abou Louz's poetry and many of his peers. We can find these strands, which form the storyline of Abou Louz's poem, in his latest collection of poetry "The Wife of Salt" (publications of the "Dubai Cultural Magazine" 2013), which collects writings belonging to the last fifteen years. Abou Louz, although he gets rid of the features of the slogans and the direct tone that were part of the world of his poem in its beginnings, yet he extracts from it the human tone of resistance and the stress on the impact of exile that distracts the poem from its origin meaning.

What is present strongly, are the rural elements, the infernal tone, the brutal rebellious tendency (and expressed by verbal lupus, which is reminiscent of the previous collection of Abou Louz "The Weary of the Wolf", 1995), and the pure meditative language that characterizes short signed or signed prose poems, or Sentences and syllables in long poems in which the breathless rhythm rises and falls, and the poem is coherent around a specific focus, or it disintegrates and turns into images and rhythms. In the poem "The Fog Pastures" the elements of the agricultural pastoral environment are present, mixed with the memory of a distant Firdawsi's youth, fading dreams, and motherly tenderness that compensates for the absence of a symbolic dead father who gives his revenge to his son and leads him to destruction like himself.

It can be said that Yousef Abou Louz seeks in all his poetry to revolve around one subject: memory and loss. It expresses the experience of loss by going back to childhood and youth, the lost lands, the homes he left, and the women he left or left him: Yesterday, I lost a home / Who “saw” a home similar to me / Who saw it? / Yesterday, / I loved the sweetest girl, / I lost her Like my house which/ I will love only.” (p:66)

Writing poetry, in this case, is nothing but a desperate attempt to heal the rift of memory and loss, to recover his memories. He, as he says, writes poetry, to remember, "between salt and sugar."

Abou Louz is a member of the Jordanian Writers Association, and the General Secretariat of the General Union of Arab Writers. He publishes his poetic and literary productions in Arab newspapers and magazines. He has also participated in many cultural festivals.

== Awards ==
- Arar Literature Prize from the Jordanian Writers Association.
- The Arab Writers Union Award in Damascus for his Diwan "Fatima goes early to the fields".
- 2014: Taryam Omran Press Award.
- 2014: Sheikh Zayed Book Award.

== Works ==
His poetry collections:

- Kaitosha Morning, O Camp (original title: Sabah AlKaytosha ayuha Almukhayam) in 1983.
- Fatima Goes Early to the Fields (original title: Fatima tathhab mubakeran ela Alhuqool) in 1983.
- Blood Texts (original title: Nusoos Aldam) in 1987.
- Bored Wolf (original title: Dajar Altheab) in 1992.
- Salt's wife (original title: Zawjat Almelh) in 2013.

His books:

- A Vision and a Bow (original title: Ruya wa Qaws): Reading in Gulf Literature.
