= Yusuf Liu Baojun =

Chinese Muslim historian and researcher (born 1963)

Haji Yusuf Liu Baojun
- Born: 8 April 1963 (age 63); Tianshui, Gansu, China
- Education: IIUM
- Occupations: Author, researcher
- Years active: 1993–present
- Spouse: Hjh Aishah Zhang Baohong
- Children: 3

Haji Yusuf Liu Baojun (born 8 April 1963) is a Chinese Muslim historian and researcher, best known as the author of Exodus Through Tian Shan – The Tale of Chinese Muslims in Central Asia, a book that has gained wide attention in Mainland China. He has published more than 15 books since 1991 written in three languages: English, Mandarin and Malay.

== Educational background ==
In 1987, Hj Yusuf Liu completed his bachelor's degree from Northwest Normal University in Lanzhou, then read for a Bachelor of Literature in Chinese literature at the University of Exeter. After a few years of teaching in China, he moved to Malaysia in 1989 and completed a Bachelor of Human Science major in sociology and anthropology from the International Islamic University Malaysia (IIUM) in 1998. He completed his Master's in Education from IIUM in 2002.

== Career ==
Since 1993, Haji Yusuf Liu has been an independent writer who often submits articles to newspapers and journals in Malaysia and China. In 2009, he was invited to the University of Malaya as a research fellow in the Centre of Malay Studies and the Institute of China Studies. He ended his contract with the University of Malaya in 2012 and enrolled in business, where he served as the managing director of CM Diverse Sdn. Bhd.

He is currently the Guest Writer of International Institute of Islamic Thought and Civilization (ISTAC) – IIUM, where he is focusing on the research of the historical relationship of Chinese Muslims with Southeast Asia as well as the Chinese Muslims in Malaysia today.

Since 2015, Hj Yusuf Liu has served as the Supreme Council Member of a Malaysian NGO, Dunia Melayu Dunia Islam (DMDI), as well as the DMDI Sub-Chairman of China Region. His significant contribution of strengthening the relationship between Chinese Muslims in China, the Hui ethnic group, and Muslims in Malaysia has been recognised by the award of the Hang Tuah Honour of Contribution conferred by DMDI in 2015.

Haji Yusuf Liu has committed himself to serve as a bridge of understanding and harmony between Chinese Muslims and Malaysia. He has arranged various exhibitions of Chinese Muslims in Pulau Pinang, Perak, and Kuala Lumpur. His latest exhibition was in August 2016, ‘Expression of Chinese Muslim Culture: Unity in Diversity’ in Gallery Tuanku Fauziah, Universiti Sains Malaysia.

== Publications ==
- Flowing to East, Yellow River in 1992, Mandarin. Published by Scholar Publication House of Malaysia.
- A Glance at Chinese Muslims in 1998, English. Published by Anzagain Book Company of Malaysia. (ISBN 983-2032-13-X)
- To Know Islam (Booklet) in 1998, Mandarin. Published by JAKIM.
- Perkembangan Masyarakat China Muslim Di Dunia (The World Chinese Muslim's Development) in 1999, Malay. (ISBN 983-2032-18-0)
- Understanding Confucianism in Islamic perspective (Booklet) in 1999, Mandarin. Published by Ministry of Religion of Brunei Darussalam
- Chinese Muslim Calligraphy in 2001, English. Published by National Art Gallery of Malaysia. (ISBN 983-9572-28-8)
- Muslims in China (Co-Author) in 2002, Malay and English. Published by National Museum of Malaysia.
- Overseas Chinese Muslims in 2004, Mandarin (China Edition). Published by National Publication House of China. (ISBN 7-105-06350-5 G.1207)
- Great Chinese Envoy Cheng Ho (Zheng He) in 2004, English. Published by Malacca state government in Malaysia. (ISBN 983-418-280-5)
- Exodus Through Tian Shan (The Tales of Donggan People in Former Russia) in 2004, (China Edition). Published by Ningxia People's Publication House of China. (ISBN 7-227-02734-1)
- Nanyang Sanji – the ASEAN Impression in 2010, Mandarin. Published by Ningxia People's Publication House of China.
- Exodus Through Tian Shan - The Tales of Donggan People in Former Russia 2nd edition in 2011, Mandarin. Re-published by Ningxia People's Publication House of China.
- The World Chinese Muslims in 2011, Mandarin. Published by Ningxia People's Publication House of China. (ISBN 978-7-227-04403-1)
- Malay Communities in China in 2013, English and Mandarin. Published by Saba Islamic Media.
- Dr Mahathir and Chinese Muslims in 2013, English and Mandarin. Published by Saba Islamic Media.

== Social commitment ==
Haji Yusuf Liu is active in strengthening the relationship between Malaysia and China. He has arranged and accompanied YAB Tan Sri Mohd Ali Rustam, former Chief Minister of Melaka, to visit Muslim communities in Shanghai and Ningxia of China in 2010 and 2012; he arranged and accompanied Mahathir Mohamad's private visits to Chinese Muslim Communities in Ningxia in 2009, as well as the second visit in Sa Dian and Na Jiaying County, Yunnan, China in June 2013. He has also accompanied Y. Bhg Tan Sri, Vice Chancellor of UM, in his visit to China's University.

Recently in 2017, he has arranged and accompanied a visit with YAB Tan Sri Rais Yatim to several cities in China, as a courtesy visit to the city Beijing, Xi'an, and Sanya.
