= Yusuf Maryam =

Nigerian politician (born 1975)

The Honourable Yusuf Maryam

Member of the Kwara State House of Assembly
- Incumbent
- Assumed office 18 March 2023

Member of the Kwara State House of Assembly from Ilorin, Ilorin South Local Government
- Incumbent
- Assumed office 18 March 2023
- Constituency: Ilorin South

Personal details
- Born: 1 January 1975 (age 51) Ilorin, Ilorin South Local Government Kwara State Nigeria
- Party: All Progressive Congress
- Education: Bayero University
- Alma mater: Bayero University
- Occupation: Politician; Political Scientist

Yusuf Maryam Aladi is a Nigerian public administrator and politician representing the Ilorin south constituency, Ilorin south local government area in the 10th Assembly of the Kwara State House of Assembly.

== Early life and education ==
Maryam was born in 1975 in Ilorin, Ilorin South Local Government area of Kwara State Nigeria. She studied public administration at Bayero University, Kano, during her undergraduate where she earned her diploma and bachelor's degree in political science in 1994 and 1999 respectively.

== Career ==
Maryam is an experienced administrator who joined politics, previously serving as administrative assistance at Standard Construction Nig ltd, Kano, between 1994 and 1995, prior to her election as a member of the 10th Assembly in Kwara State under the All Progressive Congress platform in the 2023 general election to represent Ilorin South Constituency.
