= Yusuf Rıza Pasha =

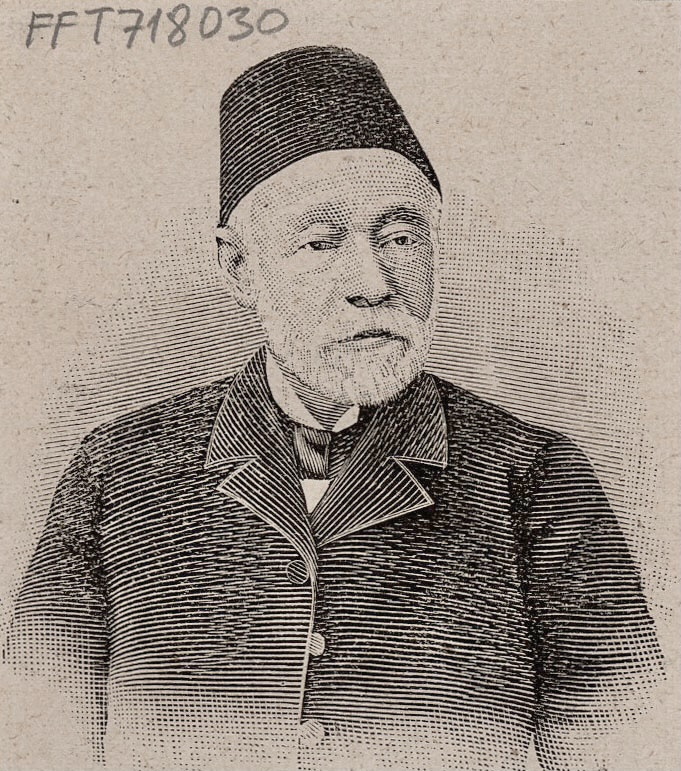
Yusuf Rıza Pasha

Yusuf Rıza Pasha (1826 – 1894) was an Ottoman politician during the late Tanzimat period.
