= Yusif Rahman =

Ghanaian footballer

Yusif
Personal information
- Full name: Yusif Rahman
- Date of birth: 26 January 1993 (age 33)
- Place of birth: Ghana
- Height: 1.86 m (6 ft 1 in)
- Position: Forward

Senior career*
| Years | Team | Apps | (Gls) |
| 2011–2014 | Alki Larnaca | 14 | (1) |
| 2014–2016 | PAEEK | 41 | (14) |
| 2016 | Ethnikos Latsion | 5 | (0) |
| 2017 | Ormideia | 15 | (4) |
- * Club domestic league appearances and goals as of May 2016

Yusif Rahman (born 26 January 1993) is a Ghanaian footballer who plays as a forward.
