= Yusuf Matcheswalla =

Indian psychiatrist

- Years active: 28 years
- Medical career
- Profession: Professor of Psychiatry and Doctor
- Institutions: Global Hospital
- Sub-specialties: Psychiatry

Yusuf Matcheswalla (Marathi: युसुफ माचेसवाला) is a senior psychiatrist from Mumbai, Maharashtra in India since the last 28 years.

Dr. Yusuf A. Matcheswalla is Honorary Professor of Psychiatry, Grant Government Medical College, Sir Jamshetjee Jeejebhoy Group of Hospitals (J.J. Hospital).

He was an Honorary Psychiatrist and Head of Department at Masina Hospital's psychiatric ward. He currently practices at Balaji Hospital, Byculla which is very near to the Masina Hospital. He is Honorary Psychiatrist at Sir J.J Hospital, G. T. Hospital, Saifee Hospital and Nagpada Police Hospital.

He has been instrumental in the development of the Department of Psychiatry at Masina Hospital.

He was President of the Bombay Psychiatric Society for the year 2006-2007 and was Chairman - Specialty section (Forensic Psychiatry) of the Indian Psychiatric Society

He is Life Fellow Member of the Indian Psychiatric Society, the Bombay Psychiatric Society and the American Psychiatric Association, the Indian Medical Association, Indian Association for Occupational Health, Association of Industrial Psychiatry of India. He is member of the Medical Associations of Mumbai's A, B, C, D and E Wards, besides being a member of a number of associations working in the field of mental health.

He is the chairman of Humanity Health Organisation, a grass roots charitable trust, working among the under-privileged and down-trodden sections of society in the field of health.

He is also the founder-chairman of "Dilaasa" Self Help Charitable Trust, a support and self-help group for families of people with a mental health or addiction problem.
