= Yusuph Olaniyonu =

Nigerian journalist and lawyer

Yusuph Adebola Olaniyonu is a journalist, lawyer and public administrator, who serves as the Special Adviser on Media and Publicity to the President of the Nigeria Senate, Bukola Saraki.

== Early life and education ==
Yusuph Olaniyonu was born in Lagos on July 30, 1966. He was educated at the then Ogun State Polytechnic, Abeokuta (now known as Moshood Abiola Polytechnic) between 1983 and 1988 and emerged as the best graduating student of the Department of Mass Communication.

He later earned a Bachelor of Law (LL.B) Degree from the Lagos State University (2005), was called to the Nigerian Bar in 2006 as Barrister and Solicitor of the Supreme Court of Nigeria and then went on to earn the Master of Law (LL.M) Degree (2010) from the University of Lagos. He had earlier earned a Master of Communication Arts (M.C.A) from the University of Ibadan (1998).

== Professional career ==
Olaniyonu joined THISDAY newspaper in June 1997 as the Political Editor of the highly influential national newspaper and contributed many reports, analyses and commentaries on political issues, particularly during the prolonged transition Programme that led to the present democracy in Nigeria. He later served briefly as Group News Editor before he left in 1999 to join The Comet newspaper as Political Editor.

Early in 2002, Olaniyonu returned to THISDAY as Deputy Editor of the SUNDAY newspaper, served in the same capacity for the daily newspaper before moving on to become the Editor of the Sunday newspaper in November 2005. He became Chairman of the Editorial Board of the newspaper group in 2011. A few months after, he was appointed Honourable Commissioner for Information and Strategy in Ogun State.

Two weeks after serving out his term as Commissioner in May 2015, he was appointed Special Adviser (Media and Publicity) to Saraki and has remained on the job till date.
