= Yusuf Sherif Abiodun =

Nigerian politician

Hon. Yusuf Sherif Abiodun

Majority Leader of the Ogun State House of Assembly
- Governor: Dapo Abiodun
- Constituency: Ado Odo/Ota I

Personal details
- Born: 1974 (age 51–52) Ogun State, Nigeria
- Education: University of Ibadan
- Occupation: Lawmaker, politician

Yusuf Sherif Abiodun (born 1974) is a Nigerian politician and legislator. He represents Ado Odo/Ota I Constituency in the Ogun State House of Assembly and serves as the Majority Leader.

== Early life and education ==
Abiodun was born in Ota, Ado-Odo/Ota Local Government Area of Ogun State in 1974. He attended Zion Methodist Primary School for his primary education and later studied at Anglican Grammar School, both located in Ota. He earned a Bachelor of Science degree in Microbiology from the University of Ibadan.

== Career ==
Abiodun was elected to the Ogun State House of Assembly as the representative for Ado Odo/Ota I Constituency. He serves as the Majority Leader of the Assembly. In this role, he presides over the forum of committee chairmen.

He also serves as Chairman of the Forum of Majority Leaders in the South West region.

== Personal life ==
Abiodun is married and has four children.
