= Yusuph Mgwao =

Tanzanian footballer

Personal information
- Full name: Yusuph Abdi Mgwao
- Date of birth: 6 August 1988 (age 38)
- Position: Forward

Senior career*
Years	Team	Apps	(Gls)
2004-2005	Simba		
2007-2008	Moro United		
2009–2011	Mtibwa Sugar		
2011–2012	Ruvu Shooting		
2012–2013	African Lyon		
2014–2016	Friends Rangers		
2016–2017	Maji Maji		
2018–2019	Arusha United		

International career^{‡}
2004	Tanzania	2	(0)
- * Club domestic league appearances and goals as of 1 August 2020 ‡ National team caps and goals as of 1 August 2020

Yusuph Mgwao (born 6 August 1988) is a retired Tanzanian football striker.
