= Yusuf Adebisi =

Nigerian politician

Yusuf Adebisi Oladen is a Nigerian politician. He currently serves as the State Representatives representing Ibadan South-West I constituency at the Oyo State House of Assembly.
