= Yusuf Ahmad Badau =

Nigerian politician

Member of the House of Representatives of Nigeria
- In office 11 June 2019 – 11 June 2023
- Constituency: Shanono/Bagwai

Personal details
- Born: Kano State, Nigeria
- Party: All Progressives Congress
- Occupation: Politician

Yusuf Ahmad Badau is a Nigerian politician and member of the House of Representatives representing the Shanono/Bagwai Federal Constituency of Kano State. He is a member of the All Progressives Congress (APC).

== Early life ==
Yusuf Ahmad Badau was born on 15 July 1971 in Badau village, Bagwai Local Government Area, Kano State, Nigeria.

== Political career ==
Badau started his political career in Bagwai Local Government Area. He served as a Supervisory Councillor for Works and Housing from 2003 to 2004 and later became Chairman of Bagwai Local Government from 2004 to 2006 during the administration of Governor Ibrahim Shekarau.

He later served as a Special Assistant on Political Matters in the Kano State Government from 2007 to 2011 and as Special Assistant on Land Matters from 2016 to 2018. He was again elected Chairman of Bagwai Local Government in 2018 and served until 2019.

In the 2019 Nigerian general election, Badau was elected to the House of Representatives to represent the Shanono/Bagwai Federal Constituency on the platform of the All Progressives Congress (APC). He was re-elected in the 2023 Nigerian general election.
