= Yusuf Moalin Amin =

Somali politician

Minister of Ports and Marine Transport of Somalia
- Incumbent
- Assumed office 17 January 2014
- Prime Minister: Abdiweli Sheikh Ahmed

Yusuf Moalin Amin is a Somali politician. He is the Minister of Ports and Marine Transport of Somalia, having been appointed to the position on 17 January 2014 by Prime Minister Abdiweli Sheikh Ahmed.
