= Yusuf Elgörmüş =

Turkish businessman

- Born: 14 September 1968; Ergani, Diyarbakır, Turkey
- Education: Cerrahpaşa Medical School
- Organization(s): Atlas University; Medicine Hospital
- Known for: Doctor businessman

Yusuf Elgörmüş (born September 14, 1968) is a Turkish doctor and businessman. He founded and is chairman of the Medicine Hospital Group and Atlas University.
