= Molla Yusef =

Molla Yusef or Molla Yusof (Persian: ملايوسف), also rendered as Mulla Yusuf, may refer to:

- Molla Yusef, Ardabil
- Molla Yusof, East Azerbaijan
