= Yousef Abdelrahman =

Emirati association football player (born 2000)

Yousef Abdelrahman يوسف عبد الرحمن
Personal information
- Full name: Yousef Abdelrahman Obaid Al-Zaabi
- Date of birth: 10 August 2000 (age 26)
- Place of birth: Emirates
- Height: 1.64 m (5 ft 5 in)
- Position: Midfielder

Youth career
- –2019: Ittihad Kalba

Senior career*
Years	Team	Apps	(Gls)
2019–2024	Ittihad Kalba	1	(0)
- * Club domestic league appearances and goals

Yousef Abdelrahman (Arabic:يوسف عبد الرحمن; born 10 August 2000) is an Emirati footballer. He currently plays as a midfielder.

== Career ==
Yousef Abdelrahman started his career at Ittihad Kalba and is a product of the Ittihad Kalba's youth system. On 7 November 2019, Yousef Abdelrahman made his professional debut for Ittihad Kalba against Al-Nasr in the Pro League, replacing Yaqoub Al Hosani.
