= Yusuf Badmus Olarewaju =

Nigerian Islamic scholar (1957–2026)

- Born: Badmus; 1957; Ilorin, Nigeria
- Died: 30 January 2026 (aged 69)
- Other name: Lanre Badmus
- Citizenship: Nigerian
- Honours: Fellow of the National Association of Teachers of Arabic and Islamic Studies (NATAIS)

Yusuf Badmus Olarewaju (1957 – 30 January, 2026) was a researcher, administrator and a professor of science of the Quran in the Islamic unit, Department of Religion, Faculty of Art, University of Ilorin.

== Early life and education ==
Badmus Olarewaju was born in 1957 to the Maimasa family in Gambari, Ilorin, Kwara State. He began his Islamic and Arabic education at Darul-uluum in Ilorin in 1971 and graduated in 1974. He advanced to the Bayero University of Kano, where he obtained a Diploma in Islamic and Arabic Studies in 1979. He obtained a BA in Islamic Studies in 1982 and a MA and PhD in Islamic Studies in 1985 and 1997 from the University of Ilorin. He also obtained a postgraduate Diploma in Teaching Arabic to non-native speakers at King Saud University, Riyadh, in 1990.

== Academic and administrative Career ==
He began his academic and administrative career in 1991, when he joined the Department of Religion, University of Ilorin. He served as the Acting Head of the Religious Studies Department, Dean of the Postgraduate School at the University of Ilorin, and Director, Centre for Affiliated Institutions.

Badmus Olarewaju was a Federal Commissioner at the National Hajj Commission of Nigeria (NAHCON) and served as the chairman of the National Hijirah Committee, Kwara State chapter. He served as the Provost of Kwara State College of Arabic and Islamic Legal Studies, Ilorin. He was also the Chief Imam of Hilal Jummuah mosque in Ilorin.

He was a member of the council of Ullama Advisory Committee to the Emir of Ilorin on religious conflict and any matters referred to it by the palace.

== Death ==
Badmus Olarewaju died on Friday, January 30, 2026, in Lagos at the age of 69 after a brief illness.
