= Yousef Casewit =

Egyptian-born American Quranic scholar

Yousef Casewit is an American Quranic scholar and assistant professor of Qur'anic Studies at the University of Chicago.

== Biography ==
Yousef was born in Egypt and raised in Morocco, and has studied with Muslim intellectuals in Morocco, Syria, and Mauritania. He received his M.A., M.Phil., and Ph.D. in Islamic Studies from Yale University. Casewit worked as a Humanities Research Fellow at New York University Abu Dhabi and an Assistant Professor of Arabic intellectual heritage and culture at the American University of Sharjah before joining the Divinity School at the University of Chicago. He is proficient in Arabic, French, and Spanish.

== Works ==
- The Mystics of Al-Andalus: Ibn Barrajān and Islamic Thought in the Twelfth Century (Winner of Iran World Book Award of the Year (2019)
- A Qurʾān Commentary by Ibn Barrajān of Seville (d. 536/1141): Wisdom Deciphered, the Unseen Discovered - Ῑḍāḥ al-Ḥikma bi-ʾAḥkām al-ʿIbra, co-edited with Gerhard Böwering, Brill, Tafsir Qurʾānic Studies Series (2015)
- Sufism Revived: A Contemporary Treatise on Divine Light, Prophecy, and Sainthood
- ʿAfīf al-Dīn al-Tilimsānī, The Divine Names: A Mystical Theology of the Names of God in the Qurʾan, ed. & trans. Yousef Casewit (2023)

== See also ==
- Walid Ahmad Saleh
