= Yusuf Alireza =

Bahraini entrepreneur

- Born: August 1970 (age 56)
- Education: International Economics from Edmund A. Walsh School of Foreign Service

Yusuf Abdulla Yusuf Akbar Alireza (born August 1970, Bahrain) is the chief executive officer (CEO) and co-founder of ARP Global Capital, a fund based in Dubai. Alireza was previously a partner and co-head of the Asia-Pacific region at Goldman Sachs. He was also CEO of Noble Group, a Hong Kong energy conglomerate and Fortune Global 500 company, until his resignation in May 2016.

== Education ==
Alireza received a joint master's and bachelor's degree from the Edmund A. Walsh School of Foreign Service at Georgetown University. His bachelor's studies were in international economics, and his master's studies were in international relations and affairs.

== Career ==
Alireza spent 20 years at Goldman Sachs, ultimately becoming co-president of Asia operations, excluding Japan, and a member of the firm's global management committee. He began working at Goldman Sachs New York in 1992, in the Fixed Income Industry Research Group, before transferring to the firm's London office in 1997 and becoming the head of Europe, the Middle East, and Africa (EMEA) sales and structuring efforts.

He was made a partner in 2004, and relocated to Hong Kong in 2008, where he managed the Asia-Pacific securities division of Goldman Sachs.

Alireza was made co-head of the Asia-Pacific region, excluding Japan, in January 2011. He spent 11 months in the position before resigning in November 2011.

Alireza became CEO of Noble Group in April 2012, succeeding Ricardo Leiman as the head of the Hong Kong-based global supply chain manager of energy and agricultural products. Alireza transitioned the company to an asset-light model and sold the firm's Noble Agri business to the Chinese company Cofco Corp in 2014. Alireza resigned in May 2016 after Noble's share price fell by 76%.

In 2015, an anonymous research blog, Iceberg Research, began to question the accounting practices of Noble Group. Although the author was not initially confirmed, Alireza published an open letter identifying Arnaud Vagner, a former Noble credit analyst who had been fired in 2013, allegedly for poor performance. In 2018, Vagner confirmed that he was the blog’s author. The blog claimed that the company booked profits on long- term contracts. Noble hired PricewaterhouseCoopers, which announced that the accounting methods complied with international accounting rules, though it also advised that the company needed to improve its governance and methodology. A probe into Noble Group's accounting was launched in Singapore in November 2018, two years after Alireza's departure, and Noble sued Vagner. Noble defaulted on its debt in October 2018 and had to restructure it.

Alireza has been on several boards, including Bahrain's Economic Development Board, the National Bank of Bahrain, the Bahrain Ship Repairing and Engineering Company, Room to Read, and the Georgetown Center for Contemporary Arab Studies.
