= Yousef Algafari =

Saudi business executive (born 1972)

- يوسف القفاري
- Born: Youssef Mohammed Al Gafari; 1972 (age 52–53); Riyadh, Saudi Arabia
- Known for: Former CEO of Abdullah AlOthaim Markets

Yousef Algafari (Arabic: يوسف القفاري; born 1972) is a Saudi business executive. He served as the chief executive officer of Abdullah AlOthaim Markets between 2006–09 and 2013–16, he also was an executive and key spokesperson for AL-Othaim Holding Company.

== Career ==
After he left college, Algafari began his career in the banking sector. In 1997, he joined Samba Financial Group as director of human resources until 2004. He also held executive positions at Al Rajhi Bank and Riyad Bank in the 1990s.

Prior to joining AlOthaim, Algafari served as vice president and board member at Lazordi group, a Saudi jewelry company. He also worked in the public sector as a founding partner and Deputy Assistant Secretary-General at the Saudi Commission for Tourism and National Heritage.

In 2006, he was appointed the CEO of Abdullah AlOthaim Markets, Saudi Arabia's second largest grocery company, as well as a director at Al Othaim Real estate and Investment Company. Algafari served as CEO until 2009. On 9 July 2013, he returned to hold the CEO position. He resigned in December 2017, and remained a non-executive board member until 2017.

Algafari was the chairman of the Riyadh-based Mueen Recruitment Company until 2016.

In July 2018, he was appointed the CEO of Maharah Human Resources Company, but resigned in December 2019, after rejecting the board's long-term incentive plan.

Between 2018 and 2019, Algafari served as managing director and board member at Abu Muti Bookstores Company, a Saudi joint stock company dealing in office and school supplies.

In 2019, he was awarded the Best Arab CEO in the Human Resources category at the G2T Global Awards that was held in Marrakesh, Morocco.
