= Big Life Fix =

English television show

Big Life Fix is a British television show from the BBC Two that first broadcast in 2018. In this television show inventors (engineers, designers, scientists and developers) find creative and concrete solutions for problems that people with disabilities encounter on a daily basis. This format is created by Studio Lambert. In the first series (2016), featuring seven inventors: Ross Atkin, Zoe Laughlin, Yusuf Mohammed, Jude Pullen, Ruby Steel, Ryan White and Haiyan Zhang. In series two (2017-18), Akram Hussein joined the team of inventors.

== International variants ==
- Team Scheire, a Belgium variant of the Big Life Fix
- [The big life fix Ireland]
- [wegaanhetmaken We Gaan Het Maken], a variant of the program broadcast in 2021 in the Netherlands
