= Yousef al-Kalabi =

Iraqi politician

Yousef al-Kalabi يوسف الكلابي

Politician
- Incumbent
- Assumed office 2010

Personal details
- Born: 1978 (age 47–48) Baghdad, Iraq
- Party: Badr Organization & Fatah Alliance
- Occupation: Politician, leading member of badr organization and security spokesman for popular mobilization forces.

Yousef al-Kalabi (Arabic: يوسف الكلابي) is an Iraqi politician, and leading member of Badr Organization and Security spokesman for Popular Mobilization Forces.

== Bio ==
al-Kalabi, born in Baghdad 1978, is an Iraqi politician and former Assistant to the Deputy Chairman of the Popular Mobilization Forces for Combatant Affairs, Chairman of the committee to Commemorate the Tikrit Massacre.He entered the Iraqi elections as a candidate for the Fatah Alliance. He is a leading member of Badr Organization and Security spokesman for Popular Mobilization Forces.

== Positions ==
- Member of Badr Organization
- Security spokesman for Popular Mobilization Forces

== See also ==
- Hadi Al-Amiri
- Abu Mahdi al-Muhandis
- Mohanad Najim Aleqabi
- Ahmed Al Asadi
