= Yusuf Dahiru Liman =

Nigerian politician

Speaker, Kaduna State House of Assembly,Member representing Makera Constituency

Personal details
- Born: Kaduna State, Nigeria
- Occupation: Politician, Business Man

Yusuf Dahiru Liman is a Nigerian politician who currently serves as the Speaker of the Kaduna State House of Assembly and representative for the Makera constituency in the Kaduna State House of Assembly.
