= Yusif Huseynov =

- Born: Yusif İsmayıl oğlu Hüseynov; October 15, 1928; Baku, Azerbaijan SSR
- Died: September 1, 2009 (aged 80)
- Citizenship: USSR, Azerbaijan
- Occupation: Painter
- Awards: Honored Art Worker of the Azerbaijan SSR People's Artist of the Azerbaijan SSR

Yusif Huseynov (Azerbaijani: Yusif Hüseynov; 15 October 1928 – 1 September 2009) was a painter, Honored Art Worker and People's Artist of the Azerbaijan SSR.

== Biography ==
Huseynov was born on October 15, 1928, in Baku. He graduated from Painting School named after Azim Azimzade in 1949, and from Surikov Moscow Art Institute in 1955.

Huseynov was elected chairman of the Union of Artists of Azerbaijan in 1977. In the same year he was appointed secretary of the Union of Artists of the USSR. He led the Union of Artists of Azerbaijan until 1987. The artist worked for a long time as the head of the painting department at Azerbaijan State University of Culture and Arts. Since 2000, he had been a professor at Azerbaijan State Academy of Fine Arts.

He was elected deputy of Supreme Soviet of Azerbaijan SSR on several summonses. Huseynov was awarded the title of Honored Art Worker of the Azerbaijan SSR in 1964 and People's Artist of the Azerbaijan SSR in 1979.

Huseynov returned to Azerbaijan in the second half of the 50s. The talented graphic artist debuted at the exhibition of young artists of the Transcaucasus (1958) and his first independent works attracted the attention of spectators and critics. Huseynov began his career as an artist of a book. However, he found interest in other types of graphics, in particular, easel drawing (especially lithography) and a political poster.

The first illustrations of the artist were published in Moscow on the instructions of the magazine "Youth". Soon "Detgiz" entrusted him with the design of E.Permyak's "The Happy Nail" book. It was not easy for Huseynov to illustrate fairy tales, moreover, Russians. However, the artist creates drawings that convinced both the Russian character and the image of nature. In 1957, Huseynov returned to Baku and immediately became involved in creative work. In a short period of time, he drew up and illustrated new editions of the works of Azerbaijani writers: N.Narimanov’s novel “Bahadur and Sona”, M.Aliyev’s novel “The Son of the Mountains”, “Favorites” by A.Shaik, and B.Talibli’s short stories. Huseynov for the first time tries his hand at color illustration - he creates watercolor drawings for books for the smallest: “Ekil-bekil”, “The Lost Key”, “riddles”, “Chickens”. In 1964, a book of short stories by Suleyman Rahimov, “Laughing Fish,” designed by Y.Huseynov, was published in Baku. Actively collaborating in periodicals, he was one of the first workers in the children's magazine "Goyarchin" ("Dove"). He periodically drew for other magazines and newspapers. In 1951, at the exhibition, Y.Slossonshowed the originals of his posters on the liberation movement of the peoples of Asia and Africa: “For complete liberation”, “We demand peace, freedom”, “The Sun illuminates the path to victory”. The artist completed his first easel series based on the novel by Mehdi Huseyn “Commissar” after returning from Moscow. Exhibited at the 1957 Jubilee Art Exhibition, this series attracted viewers with the dramatic nature of the episodes depicted (“Family Woe”, “Meeting with Mother”), and dynamic composition (“Farewell, comrades”). The series also included a portrait image of Meshadi Azizbekov - the hero of the novel “Commissar”. In auto-lithograph “Ordinary morning” from the series “On the expanses of the Caspian” along the overpass, sea workers move over stormy waves. In the lithograph "Spring" - the images of young men and women, the vastness of the Caspian Sea, the sky - everything is imbued with optimism, spring freshness. At the All-Union Exhibition "Watching the World" in 1965, a series of color autolithographs by Y.Slosson"On the Border" dedicated to the everyday life of the defenders of our southern borders was successful. The prints “In the reeds”, “The playwright Jafar Jabbarly”, the landscapes “Khinalug”, a series of portraits and landscapes performed on a fishing trip, a large series of watercolors called “Fishermen of the Caspian Sea” - these are not all that were created by the young artist. A series of watercolors called “Khinalug Landscapes”, created after the trip to the northern regions (“Cloudy Day”, “Roofs”, “Road to Kurush”, etc.), especially the watercolor painting “Evening in the Village”, were successfully demonstrated both at USSR and abroad. His compositions are monumental. At republican and all-Union exhibitions, along with graphic works, Huseynov also showed paintings. Among them, one can especially note “To his native village”, “Sails”, “On the shore of the Kura”, “Wedding”, “Arax”, “Youth”, “May 1945”, “Fishermen”. In addition, over the years, he created portraits of prominent figures of Azerbaijan (Nizami Ganjavi, Ismail I, Fuzuli, Ajami Nakhchivani), as well as thematic paintings based on their works. The portrait of Dede Korkut, created to participate in the contest announced on the occasion of the anniversary of Dede Korkut, was approved and included in the Encyclopedia of Dede Korkut. Impressed by the 1992 genocide by the Armenians against the Azerbaijani people in Khojaly, he created a painting "Motherhood".

Famous artist Huseynov died on September 1, 2009.
