= Yusuf Ibrahim =

Yusuf Ibrahim may refer to:

- Yusuf Ibrahim (doctor) (1877–1953), Egyptian physician and pediatrician
- Yusuf Ibrahim (footballer) (born 1986), Nigerian footballer
- Yusuf Mahamud Ibrahim (died 1848), Somali ruler, reigning from 1798 to 1848
- Yusuf Yazbek (full name: Yusuf Ibrahim Yazbek; 1901–1982), Lebanese journalist and politician
- Yusuf Ibrahim Zailani, Nigerian politician
- Youssef Ibrahim (born 1999), Egyptian professional squash player
