= Mohammad Yousuf (general) =

Major General of Bangladesh Army

Mohammad Yousaf
- মোহাম্মদ ইউসুফ
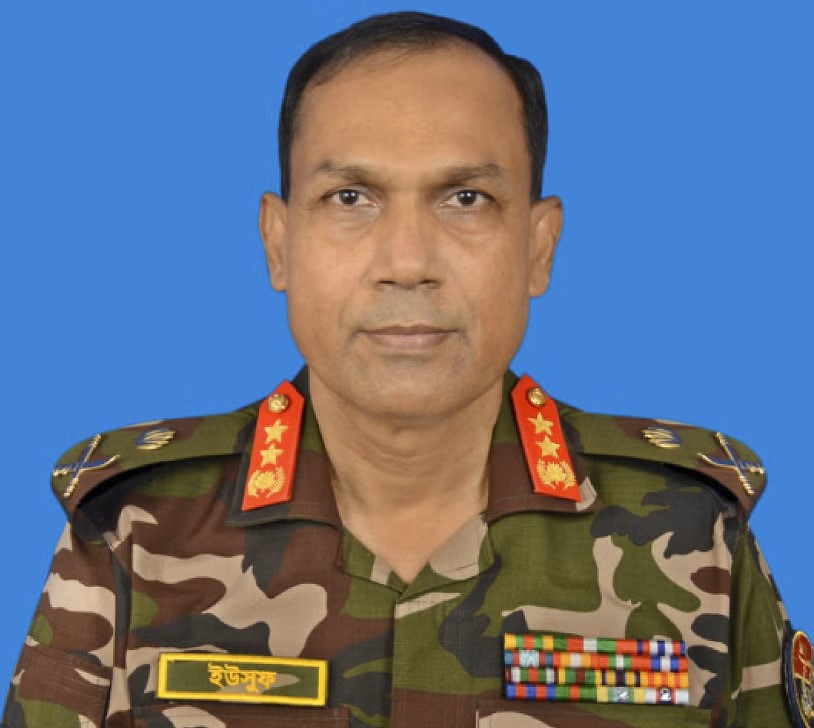
- Born: 1 April 1966 (age 60); Faujdarhat, East Pakistan, Pakistan
- Alma mater: Chittagong Medical College; Bangladesh College of Physicians and Surgeons; National University Hospital; Military Training Bangladesh Military Academy
- Military career
- Allegiance: Bangladesh
- Branch: Bangladesh Army
- Service years: 1987–2024
- Rank: Major General
- Unit: Army Medical Corps
- Commands: Commandant of Armed Forces Medical College; Director General of Directorate General of Drug Administration; Commandant of CMH, Savar; Head(Phy-med) of CMH, Dhaka
- Conflicts: MONUSCO; UNMIL

Mohammad Yousuf is a retired two star officer of the Bangladesh Army and former commandant of Armed Forces Medical College. Earlier, he was the director general of the Department of Drug Administration. Prior to that, he worked in the armed forces and the Health Department and served at the Physical Medicine Department of Dhaka CMH as head of the department.
