= Richard Samuel Elman =

British Businessman

Richard Elman
- Born: Richard Samuel Elman; May 3, 1940 (age 86); Brighton, Sussex, United Kingdom
- Occupations: Chairman & CEO of Noble Group Limited
- Years active: 1986–present
- Known for: Founder of the Noble Group

Richard Samuel Elman (born May 3, 1940) is a British businessman, the founder and Chairman of Singapore-listed, Hong Kong–based, Noble Group Limited. He also serves as a Member of Board of Directors of Clearbridge Accelerator.

== Early life and education ==
Richard Elman was born to a barrister father, Peter, and a mother, Frances (née Tuckman), who made women's clothes. At the age of 15, he started work as a labourer in a scrap metal yard sorting out non-ferrous scrap metal. Elman moved from the UK to the US (marrying, for the first time, in 1962, in San Jose), then to Asia, in the 1960s. He worked as Regional Director of Asia operations for Phibro for ten years.

== Career ==
In the early 1970s, he founded his first company, Metal Ore Asia, in Hong Kong. He sold it to Phibro in 1972. In 1986, with $100,000 of his own money, he started the Noble Group. In 1997, the company was listed on the Singapore Exchange. In June 2016, he announced he would step down from his chairman position. That followed months during which Noble had been criticised for its accounting practices.

== Philanthropy ==
In October 2015, Elman endowed the "Elman Family Visiting Professorship in Jewish and Israeli Studies" at The Hebrew University of Jerusalem and the Hong Kong University of Science and Technology.
