= Yusuf ibn al-Sayrafi =

- Born: Granada, Al-Andalus
- Died: c. 1161 / 557 AH
- Occupations: Historian, secretary
- Employer: Tashfin ibn Ali
- Known for: Chronicle of the Almoravid dynasty
- Notable work: Al-Anwar al-Jalliya fi akhbar al-dawla al-Murabitiyya

Yusuf ibn al-Sayrafi (died c. 557/1161) was a historian from Al-Andalus, and secretary of the Almoravid ruler Tashfin ibn Ali (1143–45).

Al-Sayrafi was born in Granada (in present-day Spain). He wrote a chronicle on the Almoravids, Al-Anwar al-Jalliya fi akhbar al-dawla al-Murabitiyya in which he dealt with the history of al-Andalus and the Maghreb in general and of his native Granada. Almost nothing of this work has survived, but it is quoted by other historians such as Ibn al-Khatib and ibn Idhari (especially in his al-Ihata fi akhbar gharnata).
