= Muhammad Yousuf Naqash =

Mohammad Yousuf Naqash is the Chairman of the Islamic Political Party and head of the Human Rights' Division of the All Parties Hurriyat Conference.

Muhammad Yousuf Naqash was a member of the Students' Liberation Front, the student wing of the Jammu Kashmir Liberation Front. In 1990 he was arrested as part of the Insurgency in Jammu and Kashmir. Naqesh was imprisoned for more than four years, and was subjected to electrical shocks and other forms of torture under interrogation.

In 1992, the Kashmir Liberation Council (KLC) was formed from the Students' Liberation Front. The KLC's first chief patron was Mohammad Abbas Ansari, a veteran Hurriyat leader. Naqash joined while he still in jail. Later, its name was changed to Kashmir Mass Movement and he became its Vice-President. Naqash wrote its Constitution, which was later changed by Bilal Beg, who had then crossed over to Pakistan. Naqash left the party and publicly opposed and criticized the changes. After this, Naqash set up the Kashmir Political Party, which was renamed as the Islamic Political Party in 2001.
