= Pranab Kumar Chowdhury =

Bangladeshi pediatrician and writer

- প্রণব কুমার চৌধুরী
- Born: 1960 (age 65–66); Chittagong, Bangladesh
- Education: Chittagong Medical College
- Occupations: Author; academic; paediatrician
- Writing career
- Language: Bengali, English
- Genres: Child health; fiction; Children's literature; Poetry
- Notable work: Chhotoder Chikitsa Samagra (part 1-6)
- Notable awards: Swadhinata Smarak Sommanona 2017, Ahmed Sofa literary award 2019

Pranab Kumar Chowdhury is a Bangladeshi pediatrician, academic and writer. He authored many books on child healthcare as well as children's fiction in Bengali. He also co-authored a textbook on pediatrics. He was awarded 'Swadhinata Smarak Sommanona Padak' by Chittagong City Corporation in 2017 for his contribution in child healthcare. In addition, he was awarded the Chittagong City Corporation Ekushey Literary Award in February 2025 for his contribution to pediatric services. He regularly writes articles on children's care in popular newspapers. His six-part book on children's healthcare in Bengali (Chhotoder Chikitsha Samagra: Children's treatment omnibus) was lauded by Shamsuzzaman Khan and Anisuzzaman. He is the former professor and head of the Department of Paediatrics, Chittagong Medical College, Chittagong, Bangladesh. He regularly sees patients at Doctors Lab, Chittagong.

== Early life and education ==
Pranab was born in Chittagong, Bangladesh in 1960. He passed MBBS from Chittagong Medical College in 1984. He obtained FCPS in paediatrics from Bangladesh College of Physicians and Surgeons in 1995. He received FRCP from Royal College of Physicians and Surgeons of Glasgow. He also obtained a PhD degree from Chittagong University in the field of 'Paediatric Science'. His PhD topic is 'Vitamin D Status of Infants and Children in South-East Region of Bangladesh'.

== Publications ==
=== Research works ===
Pranab published many research articles and reviews on paediatrics in reputed journals. He is also a member of editorial board of Bangladesh Journal of Child Health.

=== Child healthcare ===
- Chhotoder chikitsha samagra: parts 1–6; Rup Prokashon
- Shishu Niramoy; Somoy Prakashan
- Shishur Jibon; Agamee Prakashani
- Shishur Khaoa Daoa (Feeding and Nutrition of Children; 2005); Anupam Prakashani. ISBN 9844042623
- Baby Care: Preventive child health; Anupam Prakashny. ISBN 9844041422
- Tumi kivabe bhalo thakbe (2015) Prothoma Prokashon
- Bacchar Dekhashona; Puthiniloy
- Shishur Oshukh bishukh O Protikar; Gronthokutir
- Chhotoder Swasthyo; Agamee Prakashani
- Shishur Kon Oshukhe Ki Koroniyo; Somoy Pralashan
- Jibonbhor Nirog Shishu(Snake bite and management); Puthiniloy
- Shishurog Porichoy; Grontho Kutir
- Shishu Samagra; Puthiniloy
- Shishu Nursing O Sebika; Anupam Prakashani. ISBN 9847015201784
- Ananda Ujjwal Paramayu Amonojogi Danpite Shishu; Rup Prokashon
- Shishur Swasthyo Kushol; Mowla Brothers
- Shishu Swasthyo O Chikitsha; Mowla Brothers
- Shishur lifestyle; Anupam Prakashani. ISBN 9844042380
- Shishur Sohoj Daktari; Somoy ProkashonProkashon
- Shishur Ityadi; Somoy Prokashon
- Apnar Shishur Swasthyo Diary; Somoy Prokashon
- Sontan Chhele na Meye; Rup Prokashon. ISBN 9789849329015

=== Short stories ===
- Chhoto prescroptioner golpo; Mowla Brothers
- Prescriptioner Golpo; Rup Prokashon

=== Novels ===
- Daktar O Debshishu (2014); Somoy Prakashan
- Hummu's ashcorjo kolom (2017); Rup Prokashon ISBN 9789849259930
- Debshishu; Puthiniloy

=== Poetry ===
- Valentine priya (2017); Rup Prokashon. ISBN 9789849259992
- Daktar Mamar Swasthyo Bachan; Karat Prokash
- Daktar Mamar Chhora Golpo; Anupam Prakashani ISBN 9844042364
- Ishwar Shunyo Ishwar; Rup Prokashon
- Ma O 5 Magh Shahbagh; Rup Prokashon

=== Pediatric textbook ===
- A Simple Textbook of Pediatrics (2003); Pranab Kumar Chowdhury, S. Hossain

== Personal life ==
He is married to Sulekha Chowdhury. The couple has two daughters and a son.

== Awards and honors ==
- Swadhinata Smarak Sommanona Padak 2017 by Chittagong City Corporation
- Honored by Chittagong Academy in 2019 for his contribution in child healthcare, literature.
- Ahmed Sofa Sahitya Puroshkar in 2019 for Debshishu
- Digonto Dhara Sahitya Puroshkar-2019 for Debshishu
