= Hajji Yuseflu-ye Olya =

Hajji Yuseflu-ye Olya حاجي يوسف لوعليا
- Village
- Location within Iran
- Coordinates: 37°45′09″N 48°01′00″E
- Country: Iran
- Province: East Azerbaijan
- County: Meyaneh
- Bakhsh: Kandovan
- Rural District: Garmeh-ye Shomali

Population (2006)
  - Total: 213
- Time zone: UTC+3:30 (IRST)
  - Summer (DST): UTC+4:30 (IRDT)

Hajji Yuseflu-ye Olya (Persian: حاجي يوسف لوعليا, also Romanized as Ḩājjī Yūseflu-ye ‘Olyā; also known as Ḩājjī Yūsef-e ‘Olyā and Ḩāj Yūsef-e ‘Olyā) is a village in Garmeh-ye Shomali Rural District, Kandovan District, Meyaneh County, East Azerbaijan Province, Iran. At the 2006 census, its population was 213, in 58 families.
