= Hajji Yuseflu-ye Sofla =

Hajji Yuseflu-ye Sofla حاجي يوسف لوسفلي
- Village
- Location within Iran
- Coordinates: 37°45′35″N 48°01′04″E
- Country: Iran
- Province: East Azerbaijan
- County: Meyaneh
- Bakhsh: Kandovan
- Rural District: Garmeh-ye Shomali

Population (2006)
  - Total: 59
- Time zone: UTC+3:30 (IRST)
  - Summer (DST): UTC+4:30 (IRDT)

Hajji Yuseflu-ye Sofla (Persian: حاجي يوسف لوسفلي, also Romanized as Ḩājjī Yūseflu-ye Soflá; also known as Ḩājjī Yūsef-e Soflá and Ḩāj Yūsef-e Soflá) is a village in Garmeh-ye Shomali Rural District, Kandovan District, Meyaneh County, East Azerbaijan Province, Iran. At the 2006 census, its population was 59, in 16 families.
