= Siege of Stirling Castle (1304) =

Event in the First War of Scottish Independence

- Part of the First War of Scottish Independence
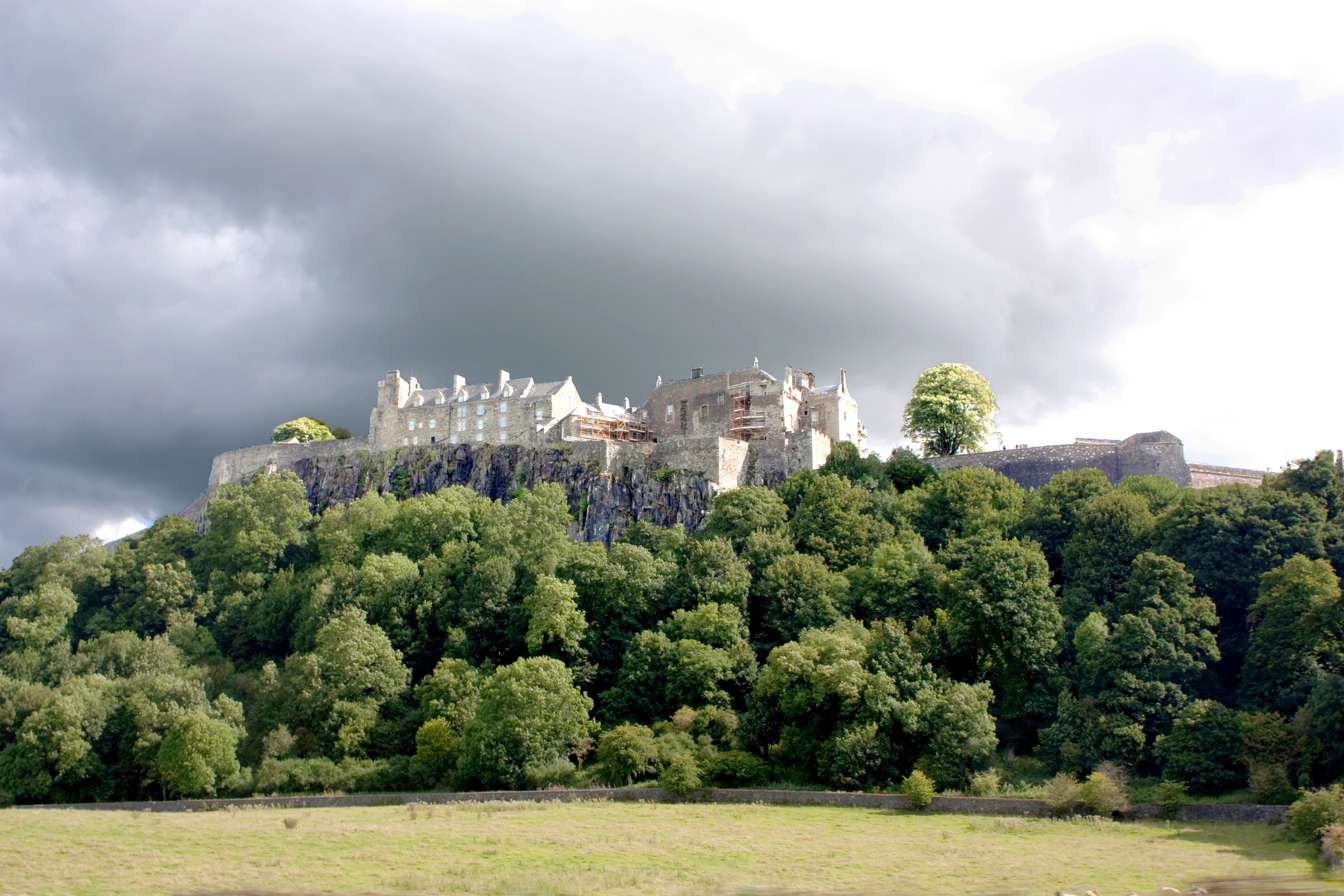
- Stirling Castle in 2009
Date	April 1304 – 24 July 1304
Location	Stirling Castle, Scotland
Result	English victory

Belligerents
Kingdom of Scotland	Kingdom of England

Commanders and leaders
Sir William Oliphant	King Edward I

Strength
30 men	12 siege engines

After the Battle of Falkirk in 1298, it took Edward I six years to gain full control of Scotland. The last stronghold of resistance to English rule was Stirling Castle. Armed with twelve siege engines, the English laid siege to the castle in April 1304. For four months the castle was bombarded by lead balls (stripped from nearby church roofs), Greek fire, stone balls, and even some sort of gunpowder mixture. Edward I had sulphur and saltpetre, components of gunpowder, brought to the siege from England.

Impatient with the lack of progress, Edward ordered his chief engineer, Master James of St. George, to begin work on a new, more massive engine called Warwolf, which was the largest trebuchet in history. The castle's garrison of 30, led by William Oliphant, eventually were allowed to surrender on 24 July after Edward had previously refused to accept surrender until the Warwolf had been tested.

Despite previous threats, Edward spared all the Scots in the garrison and executed only one Englishman who had previously given over the castle to the Scots. Sir William Oliphant was imprisoned in the Tower of London.

A skeleton from the site of the battle is believed to be the earliest evidence of trebuchet trauma in the archaeological record.
