= Yusuf ibn Urunbugha al-Zaradkash =

An illustration from al-Zaradkāsh

Yūsuf ibn Urunbughā (or Aranbughā) al-Zaradkāsh (fl. AH 867 / AD 1462–1463) was a Mamluk siege engineer who wrote a treatise in Arabic on the trebuchet, entitled Kitāb anīq fī al-manājanīq ('An Elegant Book on Trebuchets'), which is "the longest and most profusely illustrated work in any language dealing with the trebuchet". It was addressed to the Mamluk commander-in-chief (atabik) Manglī Bughā al-Shamsī. It contains a prologue and a series of lightly labelled illustrations on the construction and operation of different types of trebuchet. The illustrations go beyond just trebuchets and include other siege weapons, gunpowder weapons, projectiles and fortresses. In describing an arrow-shooting artillery piece mounted on a stand, Zaradkāsh gives the composition of gunpowder as 10 dirhams of potassium nitrate, 1.125 of sulphur and 2.5 of charcoal.

The Anīq is known from a single manuscript in Istanbul, Topkapı Sarayı Müzesi Yazma Eserler Kütüphanesi, Ahmet III Collection, MS 3469/1. There are two copies of the work in the manuscript. A preliminary edition was published by Nabīl Muḥammad ʿAbd al-ʿAzīz Aḥmad in 1981. A full edition was published by Iḥsān Hindī in 1985, reproducing the illustrations in black and white.

== Editions ==
- Ibn Aranbughā Zaradkāsh (1981). Nabīl Muḥammad ʿAbd al-ʿAzīz Aḥmad (ed.). al-Anīq fī al-manājanīq. Cairo.
- Ibn Aranbughā Zaradkāsh (1985). Iḥsān Hindī [in Arabic] (ed.). al-Anīq fī al-manājanīq. Aleppo.
