= Floating arm trebuchet =

Variation of a medieval siege weapon

The floating arm trebuchet is a counterweight siege weapon which is a modern variation of the medieval trebuchet. Their defining feature is free movement of an axle on the throwing arm, and a linear drop channel for the counterweight. The design and construction of such machines is a popular project assignment in post-secondary engineering classes.

== Basic design ==
A traditional trebuchet, which is simple to engineer, consists of an arm resting off-centre on an axle with a hinged counterweight at the short end of the arm. The difference in the lengths of the two ends of the arm provides mechanical advantage.

In contrast, a floating arm trebuchet features an axle on the arm freely moving along a horizontal glide track. This allows for a higher drop height for the counterweight, which is allowed to fall down a sturdy linear vertical "drop channel". The arm is on a moving axle and the torque acts on the entire structure, preventing stalling. The forward motion of the axle as the arm rotates adds speed to the projectile end of the arm. This linear drop of the counterweight is more efficient in transferring potential energy to kinetic energy than the pendulum counterweight motion of a traditional trebuchet. The higher the drop channel, the more energy is released, but this puts more strain on the mechanism.

The dropping of the counterweight forces the arm to swing to one side of the glide track and quickly jerk in the opposite direction to launch a projectile. This pulls the counterweight upwards slightly after a launch. The projectile can be launched at a high velocity.

== Operation ==
The floating arm trebuchet uses a counterweight held on top of a tall drop channel to transfer potential energy into kinetic energy. A projectile is loaded into a sling at the end of the throwing arm. Upon releasing the trigger, the counterweight is allowed to drop through the channel. This causes the wheel on the axle of the arm to impact the glide track, which is usually held steady with strong support beams. While this is happening, the wheel is moved backwards by the torque acting on the arm from the counterweight. The arm then jerks forward and releases the projectile from the sling. To reset the device, the counterweight must be raised back to the original height and locked in with the trigger mechanism.

While the floating arm design can have a lighter frame than a traditional trebuchet because the overall forces produced are less, the impact of the arm on the glide track will cause eventual damage and may need maintenance. Reducing the drop distance of the wheel axle to the glide track would reduce damage, but also reduce the range of the trebuchet.

== Trigger mechanism ==
The most common of several trigger mechanisms is two eye bolts and a peg through both bolts. The eye bolts are usually placed at the bottom of the frame, locking above the arm to prevent accidental release. In larger designs, the trigger system is applied at the top of the drop channel. Large scale designs require special trigger mechanisms that can hold the weight of the throwing arm.

== The sling / pouch ==
The sling or pouch, which contributes to acceleration of the projectile and then releases it at the desired launch angle, is often made using polyester rope or other durable thin material. The release mechanism is a hook with a specific bend in its tip to determine when centripetal force will release one end of the sling, freeing the projectile to continue on its path.

== Friction reduction ==
A floating arm trebuchet has three points of contact where friction can interfere with efficiency. Friction when the counterweight is dropping down to the glide strike can be reduced by using silicone grease or a thin film of plastic on the drop channel. Friction of the wheel on the arm axle against the glide track should be managed in a similar way. To reduce friction of the sling on the launch track, the track should have a smooth surface.

== Potential uses ==
The floating arm trebuchet loses the range advantage over regular trebuchet at very large scales, because the difficulty in construction of the drop channel and axle increases with size. A regular trebuchet is a better realistic war machine.

However, a floating arm trebuchet is more efficient when built to a size of between one meter and five meters, making it suitable for hobbyists and model builders. These machines and their designers are frequently to be found competing in various recreational events, for example, pumpkin chucking contests.
