= Mardi ibn Ali al-Tarsusi =

12th-century Ayyubid-era military historian, tactician and writer

Mardi ibn Ali al-Tarsusi was a 12th-century Ayyubid-era writer and expert on military matters. He wrote a number of treatises, including a military manual for Saladin in 1187. His writings have proved an invaluable resource for medieval and military historians.

Tarsusi 1187 military manual describes various throwing machines including mangonels and trebuchets.

In On the Social Origins of Medieval Institutions, more detailed quotes by Tarsusi may be found on the various types of trebuchets.

The well known treatise was entitled Tabsirat arbab al-albab fi kayfiyat al-najah fi al-hurub min al-anwa' wa-nashr he manini ahla renoshr a'lam al-a'lam fi al-'udad wa-al-alat al-mu'inah 'ala liqa' al-a'da', or "Information for the intelligent on how to escape injury in combat; and the unfurling of the banners of instruction on equipment and engines which assist in encounters with enemies."
