= Warwolf =

Trebuchet used by English forces during the Wars of Scottish Independence

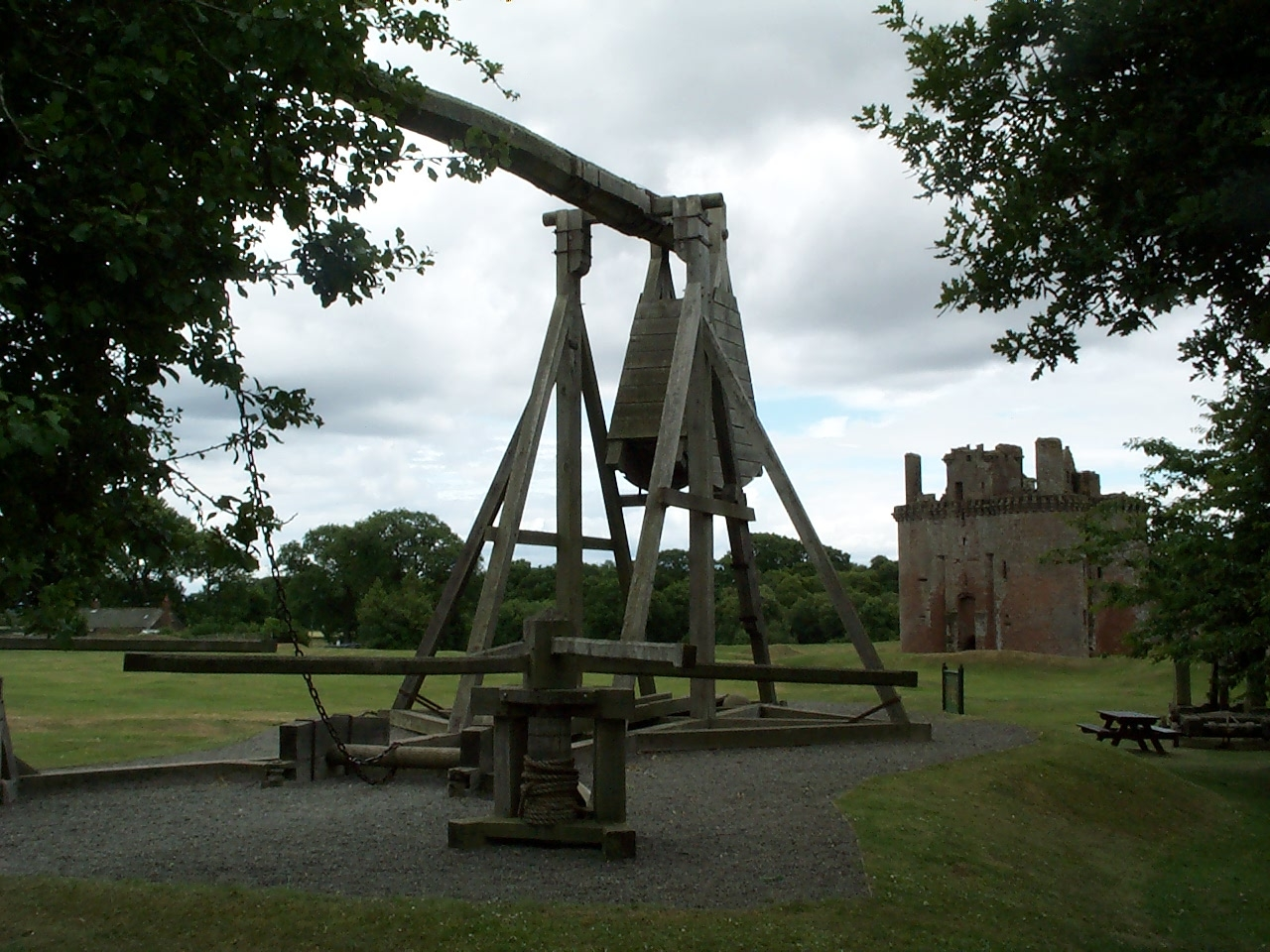
Scale model of Warwolf in front of Caerlaverock Castle

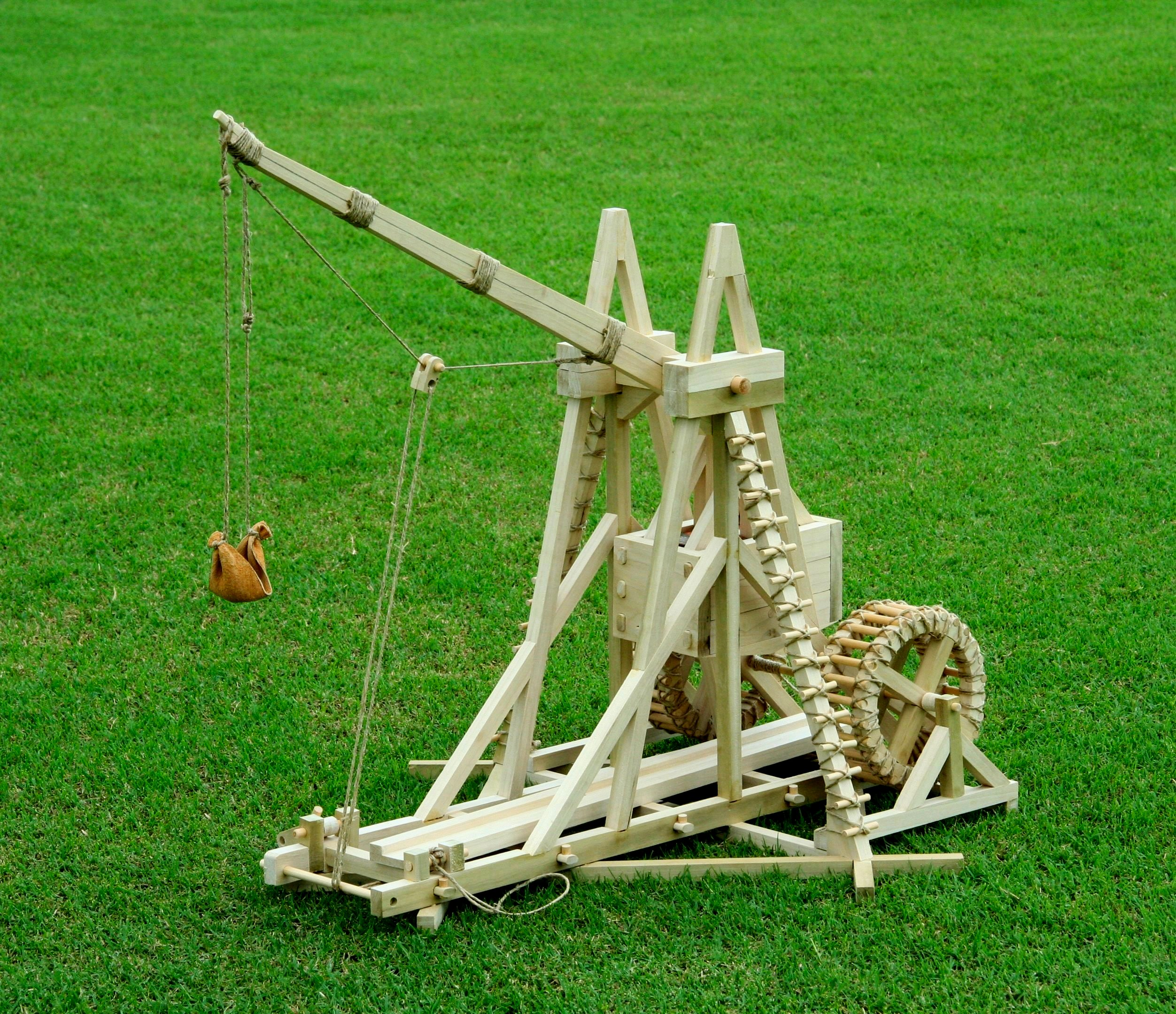
Scale model of Warwolf

The Warwolf, also known as the Loup-de-Guerre or Ludgar, is believed to have been the largest trebuchet ever made. It was created in Scotland by order of Edward I of England, during the siege of Stirling Castle in 1304, as part of the Wars of Scottish Independence. A contemporary chronicle refers to it as un engine horrible.

== Warwolf at Stirling ==
When disassembled, the weapon would fill 30 wagons in parts. It reportedly took five master carpenters and forty-nine other labourers at least three months to complete.

The Flores Historiarum claims that the Warwolf sent a single stone through two of the castle's walls in the course of the siege, "like an arrow flying through cloth". Other sources, however, report that the weapon was only finished after the Scots had surrendered. Edward decided to use it anyway, refusing to let anyone enter or leave the castle until it had been tested.

== In the original records ==
Some of the original parchment rolls of the accounts of King Edward survive. Two references to the Warwolf in Latin read:

Domino Alexandro le Convers, pro denariis per ipsum datis, per perceptem regis, carpentariis facientibus ingenium quod vocatur "Lupus guerre", et aliis operaris diversis operantibus circa dictum ingenium per vices, mensibus Maii et Junii anno presenti, per manus proprias apud Strivelyn vij^{o} die Junii, x s.

Thome de Viridi Campo valleto regine, de dono regis in recompensacionem laboris quem sustinuit circa facturam "Lupi guerre", quem rex fieri ordinavit pro insultu castri de Stryvelyn, per manus proprias apud Clyfton xij^{o} die Septembris, xl li.

To Master Alexander le Convers, for money given by him on the king's orders to the carpenters making the engine called "War Wolf", and to diverse other labourers working on the said engine in turns in May and June of the present year, by his own hand at Stirling on 7 June, ten shillings.

To Thomas Greenfield, the queen's manservant, in recompense for his labours in the making of the "War Wolf", which the king ordered to be made to slight Stirling Castle, by his own hand at Clifton on 12 September, forty pounds.

Another payment refers to a watchman; Reginald, janitor, was paid wages for guarding the Warwolf's beams for forty nights in June and July 1304.
