= Trebuchet =

Siege engine using a long arm to throw projectiles

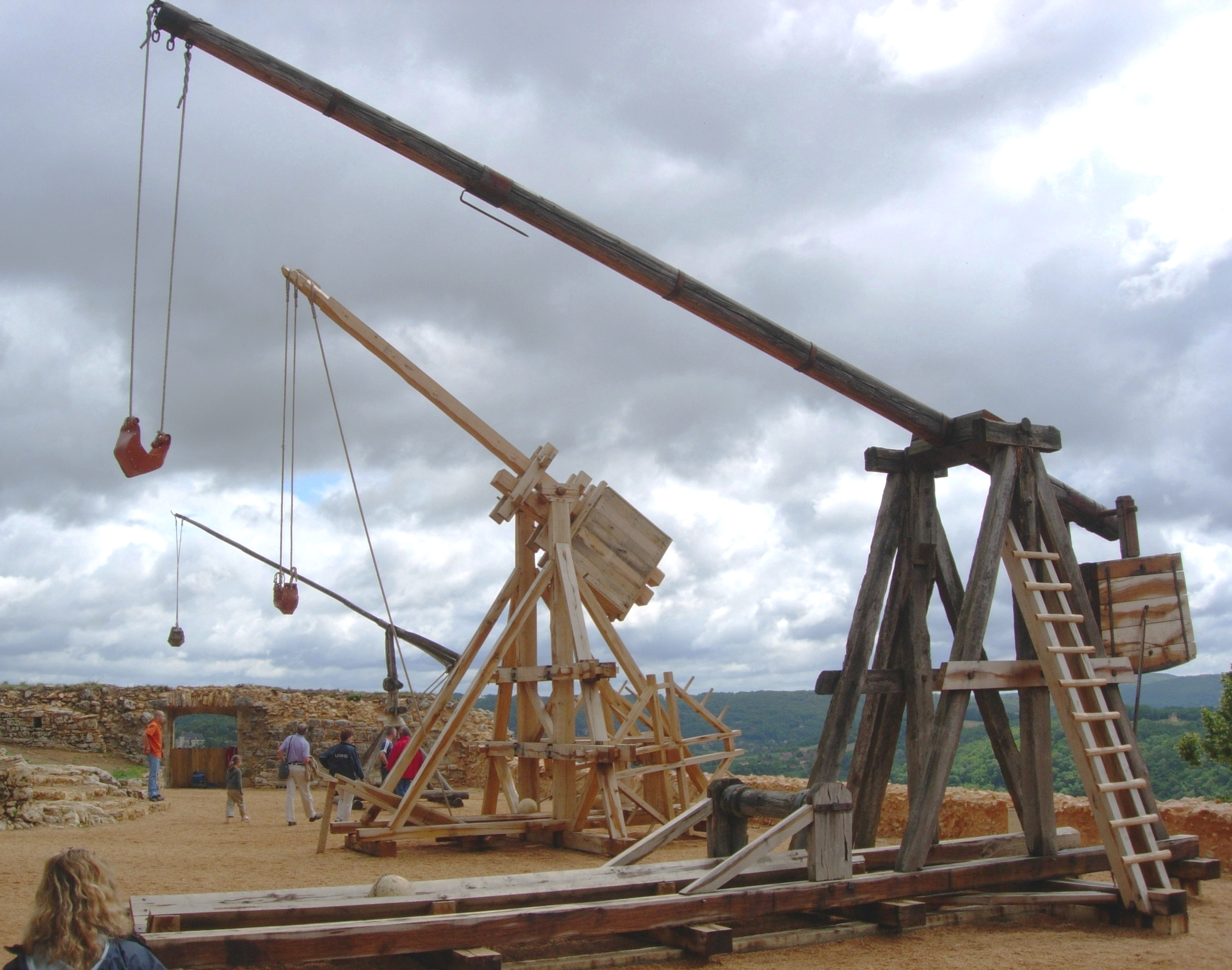
Replica counterweight trebuchets at Château de Castelnaud

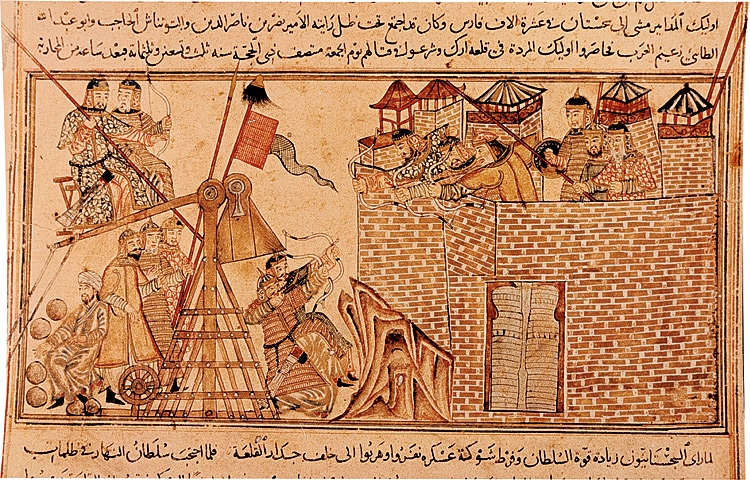
Counterweight trebuchet used in a siege from the Jami' al-tawarikh, c. 1306–1318

A trebuchet (Note: Pronounced /ˈtrɛbʊʃeɪ/ TREB-uu-shay or /ˈtrɛbəʃɛt/ TREB-ə-shet or /ˌtrɛbjʊˈʃɛt/ TREB-yuu-SHET; also spelled trebucket /ˈtriːbʌkɪt/ TREE-buk-it or /ˌtrɛbjʊˈkɛt/ TREB-yuu-KET) (French: trébuchet) is a type of catapult that uses a hinged arm with a sling attached to the tip to launch a projectile. It was a common powerful siege engine until the advent of gunpowder. The design of a trebuchet allows it to launch projectiles of greater weight and/or at greater range than a traditional catapult.

There are two main types of trebuchet. The first is the traction trebuchet, or mangonel, which uses manpower to swing the arm. It first appeared in China by the 4th century BC. It spread westward, possibly via the Avars, and was adopted by the Byzantines, Persians, Arabs, and other neighboring peoples by the sixth to seventh centuries AD.

The later, and often larger and more powerful, counterweight trebuchet, also known as the counterpoise trebuchet, uses a counterweight to swing the arm. It appeared in both Christian and Muslim lands around the Mediterranean in the 12th century, and was carried back to China by the Mongols in the 13th century.

== Etymology and terminology ==
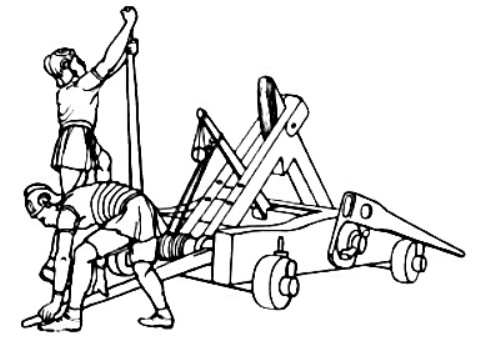
The onager was a torsion powered weapon used in Europe from the 4th until the 6th century AD

The numerous forms of the word that appeared during the 13th century, including trabocco, tribok, tribuclietta, and trubechetum, have obscured the origin of the term. In Arabic the counterweight trebuchet was called manjaniq maghribi or majaniq ifranji. In China, the traction trebuchet was called the pào (砲) while the counterweight trebuchet was called the húihúi pào (回回砲, Muslim trebuchet).

The English word trebuchet is first mentioned in the 14th century (13th century in Anglo-Latin) as "medieval stone-throwing engine of war". It is borrowed from (Old) French trebuchet (now trébuchet).

The French word is from the verbal root of trebucher (now trébucher) : trebuch- + diminutive noun suffix -et, trebucher (10th century) meant "to overthrow, to bring down", then and now "to stumble", maybe earlier "to rock" or "to tilt". It is a compound of (Old) French tre(s)-, variant form tra- (now tré- / tra-) from Latin trans expressing "displacement" in that case + Old French buc "trunk of the body, bulk", itself from Old Low Franconian *būk- "belly" similar to Old High German buh, German Bauch "belly".

The earliest appearance of the term "trebuchet" in French dates to the late 12th century and the first attestations of trebuchet as a siege weapon are from around the year 1200. The 1174–1177 edition of Roman de Renart, an epic about Renard the Fox, describes it as a "trap whose trigger mechanism consists of an assembly of balanced logs" (understood as animal trap by 1375) while the c. 1200 edition describes it as a "war engine that throws stones to break down walls". The word trabuchellus appeared alongside manganum and prederia in a document in Vicenza on 6 April 1189 (837 years ago). Trabucha is found a decade later with predariae at the siege of Castelnuovo Bocca d'Adda in an account by Iohannes Codagnellus. It is unclear, however, whether these referred to counterweight trebuchets. Codagnellus did not specify a specific type of engine with the term and even implied that they were "fairly light in subsequent references". Only in the late 1210s do variations of "trebuchet" in sources, described as increasingly powerful machines or utilizing different components, identify more closely with the counterweight trebuchet. Other terms, such as machina maior/magna, might have also referred to counterweight trebuchets.

Traction trebuchet and counterweight trebuchet are modern terms (retronyms), not used by contemporary users of the weapons. The term traction trebuchet was created mainly to distinguish this type of weapon from the onager, a torsion powered catapult that is often conflated in contemporary sources with the mangonel, which was used as a generic term for any medieval stone throwing artillery. Both the traction and counterweight trebuchets have been called mangonel at one point or another. Confusion between the onager, mangonel, trebuchet, and other catapult types in contemporary terminology has led some historians today to use the more precise traction trebuchet instead, with counterweight trebuchet used to distinguish what was before called simply a trebuchet. Some modern historians use mangonel to mean exclusively traction trebuchets, while others call traction trebuchets traction mangonels and counterweight trebuchets counterweight mangonels.

== Basic design ==
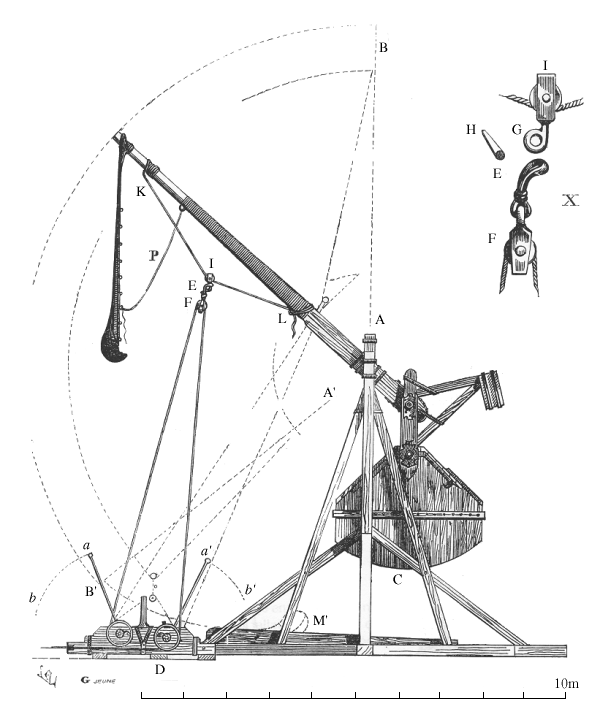
Side view of counterweight trebuchet, with a detail of the counterweight release mechanism

The trebuchet is a compound machine that makes use of the mechanical advantage of a lever to throw a projectile. They are typically large constructions, with the length of the beam as much as 15 meters (50 ft), with some purported to be even larger.

A trebuchet consists primarily of a long beam attached by an axle suspended high above the ground by a stout frame and base, such that the beam can rotate vertically through a wide arc (typically over 180°). A sling is attached to one end of the beam to hold the projectile. The projectile is thrown when the beam is quickly rotated by applying force to the opposite end of the beam. The mechanical advantage is primarily obtained by having the projectile section of the beam be much longer than the opposite section where the force is applied – usually four to six times longer.

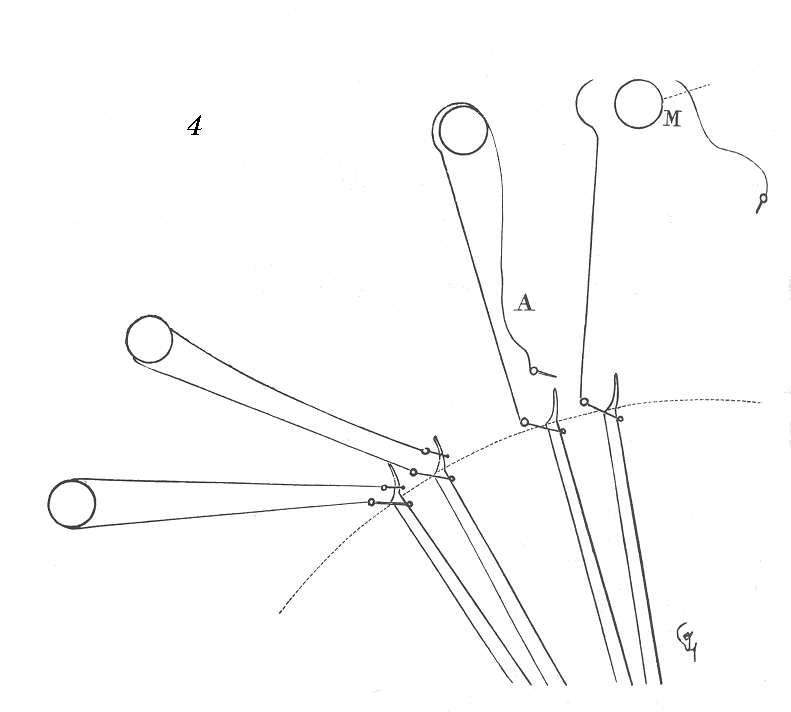
Example sling-release mechanism that automatically launches projectile at desired point of arm swing

The difference between counterweight and traction trebuchets is what force they use. Counterweight trebuchets use gravity; potential energy is stored by slowly raising an extremely heavy box (typically filled with stones, sand, or lead) attached to the shorter end of the beam (typically on a hinged connection), and releasing it on command.

Traction trebuchets use human power; on command, people pull ropes attached to the shorter end of the trebuchet beam. The difficulties of coordinating the pull of many people together repeatedly and predictably makes counterweight trebuchets preferable for the larger machines, though they are more complicated to engineer. The trebuchet had further modifications to allow an increase to its range, by creating a slot for the sling and projectile to sit underneath the trebuchet, enabling the sling to be lengthened and thus extending the range, an alteration in the trajectory, or the release point to be changed. Further increasing their complexity is that either winches or treadwheels, aided by block and tackle, are typically required to raise the more massive counterweights. So while counterweight trebuchets require significantly fewer people to operate than traction trebuchets, they require significantly more time to reload. In a long siege, reload time may not be a critical concern.

When the trebuchet is operated, the force causes rotational acceleration of the beam around the axle (the fulcrum of the lever). These factors multiply the acceleration transmitted to the throwing portion of the beam and its attached sling. The sling starts rotating with the beam, but rotates farther (typically about 360°) and therefore faster, transmitting this increased speed to the projectile. The length of the sling increases the mechanical advantage, and also changes the trajectory so that, at the time of release from the sling, the projectile is traveling in the desired speed and angle to give it the range to hit the target. Adjusting the sling's release point is the primary means of fine-tuning the range, as the rest of the trebuchet's actions are difficult to adjust after construction.

The rotation speed of the throwing beam increases smoothly, starting slow but building up quickly. After the projectile is released, the arm continues to rotate, allowed to smoothly slow down on its own accord and come to rest at the end of the rotation. This is unlike the violent sudden stop inherent in the action of other catapult designs such as the onager, which must absorb most of the launching energy into their own frame, and must be heavily built and reinforced as a result. This key difference makes the trebuchet much more durable, allowing for larger and more powerful machines.

A trebuchet projectile can be almost anything, even debris, rotting carcasses, or incendiaries, but is typically a large stone. Dense stone, or even metal, specially worked to be round and smooth, gives the best range and predictability. When attempting to breach enemy walls, it is important to use materials that will not shatter on impact; projectiles were sometimes brought from distant quarries to get the desired properties.

== History ==
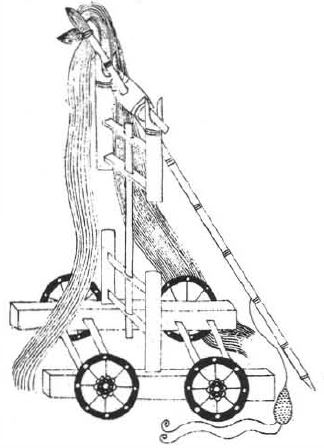
Wheeled whirlwind traction trebuchet from the Wujing Zongyao

=== Traction trebuchet ===
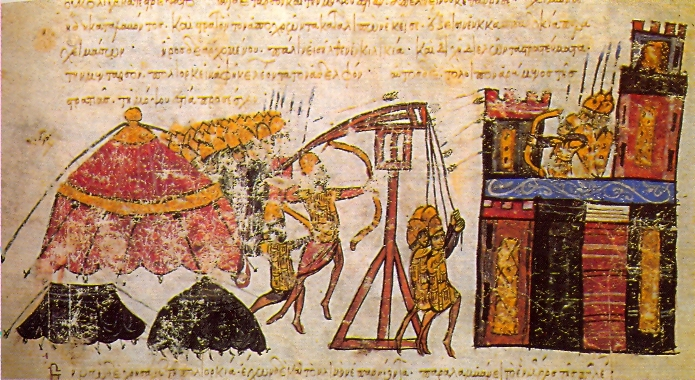
Sicilian-Byzantine depiction of a traction trebuchet, 12th-13th century

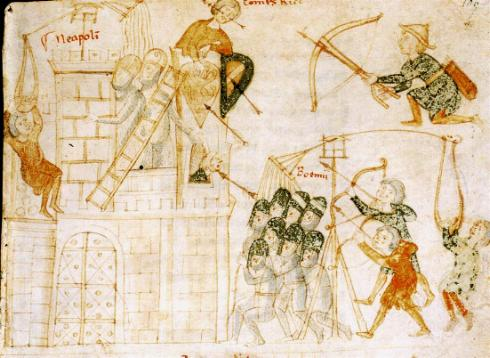
Siege of Naples (1191), c. 1196

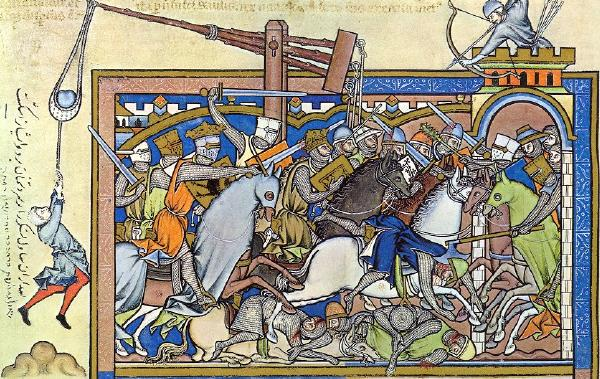
13th-century depiction of a traction trebuchet

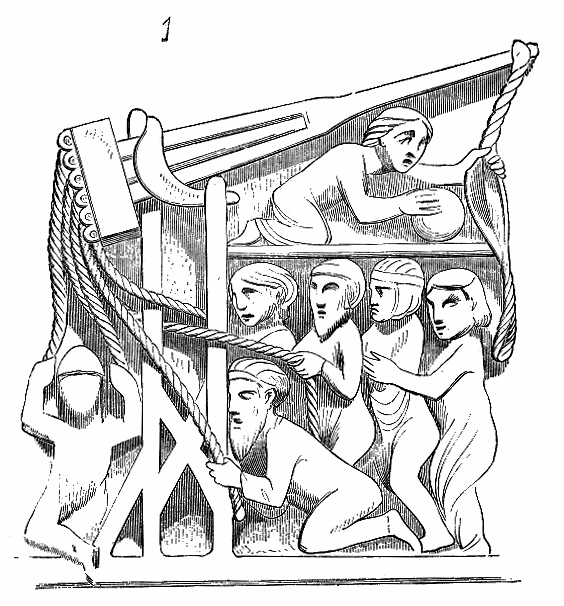
Traction trebuchet depicted at the tomb of Simon de Montfort, 5th Earl of Leicester, c. 1220

The traction trebuchet, also referred to as a mangonel in some sources, originated in ancient China.

The first recorded use of traction trebuchets was in ancient China. They were probably used by the Mohists as early as 4th century BC; descriptions can be found in the Mozi (compiled in the 4th century BC). According to the Mozi, the traction trebuchet was 17 ft (5.2 m) high with 4 ft (1.2 m) buried below ground, the fulcrum attached was constructed from the wheels of a cart, the throwing arm was 30–35 ft (9.1–10.7 m) long with three quarters above the pivot and a quarter below to which the ropes are attached, and the sling 2.8 ft (0.85 m) long. The range given for projectiles are 300 ft (91 m), 180 ft (55 m), and 120 ft (37 m). They were used as defensive weapons stationed on walls and sometimes hurled hollowed-out logs filled with burning charcoal to destroy enemy siege works. By the 1st century AD, commentators were interpreting other passages in texts such as the Zuo zhuan and Classic of Poetry as references to the traction trebuchet: "the guai is 'a great arm of wood on which a stone is laid, and this by means of a device [ji] is shot off and so strikes down the enemy.'" The Records of the Grand Historian say that "The flying stones weigh 12 catties and by devices [ji] are shot off 300 paces." Traction trebuchets went into decline during the Han dynasty due to long periods of peace but became a common siege weapon again during the Three Kingdoms period. They were commonly called stone-throwing machines, thunder carriages, and stone carriages in the following centuries. They were used as ship mounted weapons by 573 for attacking enemy fortifications. It seems that during the early 7th century, improvements were made on traction trebuchets, although it is not explicitly stated what. According to a stele in Barkul celebrating Tang Taizong's conquest of what is now Ejin Banner, the engineer Jiang Xingben made great advancements on trebuchets that were unknown in ancient times. Jiang Xingben participated in the construction of siege engines for Taizong's campaigns against the Western Regions. In 617 Li Mi (Sui dynasty) constructed 300 trebuchets for his assault on Luoyang, in 621 Li Shimin did the same at Luoyang, and onward into the Song dynasty when in 1161, trebuchets operated by Song dynasty soldiers fired bombs of lime and sulphur against the ships of the Jin dynasty navy during the Battle of Caishi.

For the trebuchet they use large baulks of wood to make the framework, fixing it on four wheels below. From this there rise up two posts having between them a horizontal bar which carries a single arm so that the top of the machine is like a swape. The arm is arranged as to height, length and size, according to the city [which it is proposed to attack or defend]. At the end of the arm there is a sling which holds the stone or stones, of weight and number depending on the stoutness of the arm. Men [suddenly] pull [ropes attached to the other] end, and so shoot it forth. The carriage framework can be pushed and turned around at will. Alternatively the ends [of the beams of the framework] can be buried in the ground and so used. [But whether you use] the 'Whirlwind' type or the 'Four-footed' type depends upon the circumstances.

— Tai bai yin jing (太白陰經) by Tang military official Li Quan (李筌), 759 AD

The traction trebuchet was adopted by various peoples west of China such as the Byzantines, Persians, Arabs, and Avars by the sixth to seventh centuries AD. Some scholars suggest that the Avars carried the traction trebuchet westward while others claim that the Byzantines already possessed knowledge of the traction trebuchet beforehand. Regardless of the vector of transmission, it appeared in the eastern Mediterranean by the late 6th century AD, where it replaced torsion powered siege engines such as the ballista and onager. The rapid displacement of torsion siege engines was probably due to a combination of reasons. The traction trebuchet is simpler in design, has a faster rate of fire, increased accuracy, and comparable range and power. It was probably also safer than the twisted cords of torsion weapons, "whose bundles of taut sinews stored up huge amounts of energy even in resting state and were prone to catastrophic failure when in use." At the same time, the late Roman Empire seems to have fielded "considerably less artillery than its forebears, organised now in separate units, so the weaponry that came into the hands of successor states might have been limited in quantity." Evidence from Gaul and Germania suggests there was substantial loss of skills and techniques in artillery further west.

According to the Miracles of Saint Demetrius, probably written around 620 by John, Archbishop of Thessaloniki, the Avaro-Slavs attacked Thessaloniki in 586 with traction trebuchets. The bombardment lasted for hours, but the operators were inaccurate and most of the shots missed their target. When one stone did reach its target, it "demolished the top of the rampart down to the walkway." The Byzantines adopted the traction trebuchet possibly as early as 587, the Persians in the early 7th century, and the Arabs in the second half of the 7th century. In 652, the Arabs used trebuchets at the siege of Dongola in the Sudan. Like the Chinese, by 653, the Arabs also had ship mounted traction trebuchets. The Franks and Saxons adopted the weapon in the 8th century. The Life of Louis the Pious contains the earliest western European reference to mangonels (traction trebuchets) in its account of the siege of Tortosa (808–809). In 1173, the Republic of Pisa tried to capture an island castle with traction trebuchet on galleys. Traction trebuchets were also used in India.

The catapult, the account of which has been translated from the Greek several times, was quadrangular, with a wide base but narrowing towards the top, using large iron rollers to which were fixed timber beams "similar to the beams of big houses", having at the back a sling, and at the front thick cables, enabling the arm to be raised and lowered, and which threw "enormous blocks into the air with a terrifying noise".

— Peter Purton

The traction trebuchet was most efficient as an anti-personnel weapon, used in a supportive position alongside archers and slingers. Most accounts of traction trebuchets describe them as light artillery weapons while actual penetration of defenses was the result of mining or siege towers. At the siege of Kamacha in 766, Byzantine defenders used wooden cover to protect themselves from the enemy artillery while inflicting casualties with their own stone throwers. Michael the Syrian noted that at the siege of Balis in 823 it was the defenders that suffered from bombardment rather than the fortifications. At the siege of Kaysum, Abdallah ibn Tahir al-Khurasani used artillery to damage houses in the town. The Sack of Amorium in 838 saw the use of traction trebuchets to drive away defenders and destroy wooden defenses. At the siege of Marand in 848, traction trebuchets were used, "reportedly killing 100 and wounding 400 on each side during the eight-month siege." During the siege of Baghdad in 865, defensive artillery were responsible for repelling an attack on the city gate while traction trebuchets on boats claimed a hundred of the defenders' lives.

Some exceptionally large and powerful traction trebuchets have been described during the 11th century or later. At the siege of Manzikert (1054), the Seljuks' initial siege artillery was countered by the defenders' own, which shot stones at the besieging machine. In response, the Seljuks constructed another one requiring 400 men to pull and threw stones weighing 20 kg (44 lb). A breach was created on the first shot but the machine was burnt down by the defenders. According to Matthew of Edessa, this machine weighed 3,400 kg (7,500 lb) and caused a number of casualties to the city's defenders. Ibn al-Adim describes a traction trebuchet capable of throwing a man in 1089. At the siege of Haizhou in 1161, a traction trebuchet was reported to have had a range of 200 paces (over 400 m (1,300 ft)).

West of China, the traction trebuchet remained the primary siege engine until the 12th century when it was replaced by the counterweight trebuchet. In China the traction trebuchet was the primary siege engine until the counterweight trebuchet was introduced during the Mongol conquest of the Song dynasty in the 13th century.

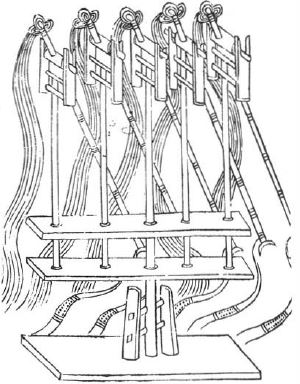
Five whirlwind trebuchets from the Wujing Zongyao

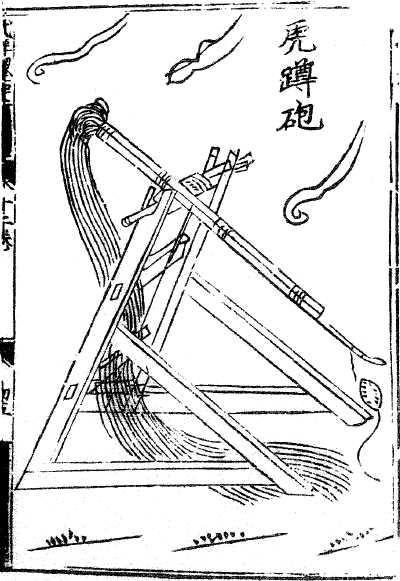
Crouching tiger trebuchet from the Wujing Zongyao

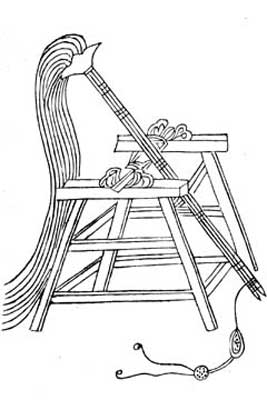
Sìjiǎo "Four Footed" traction trebuchet from the Wujing Zongyao

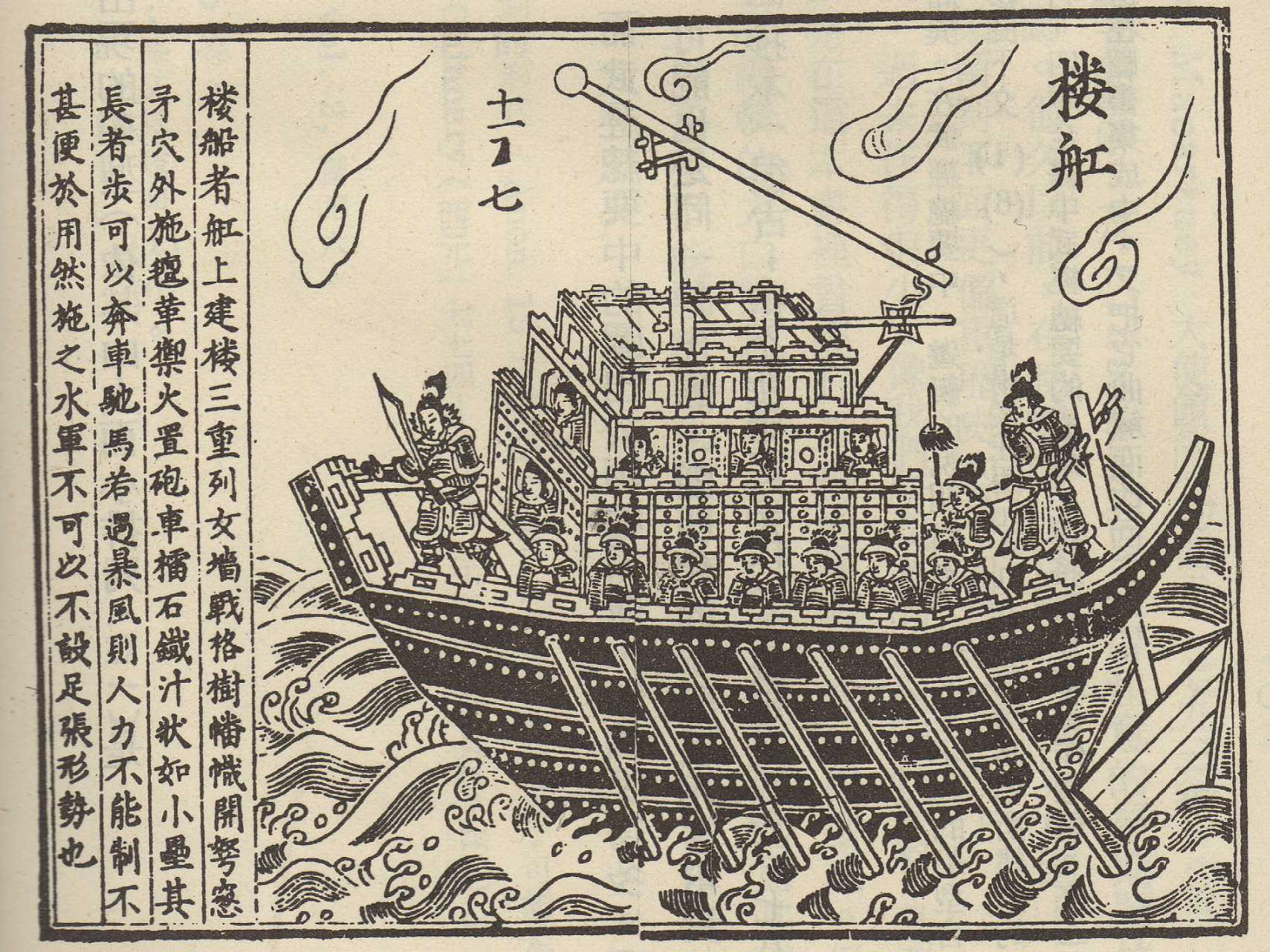
Traction trebuchet on a Song Dynasty warship from the Wujing Zongyao

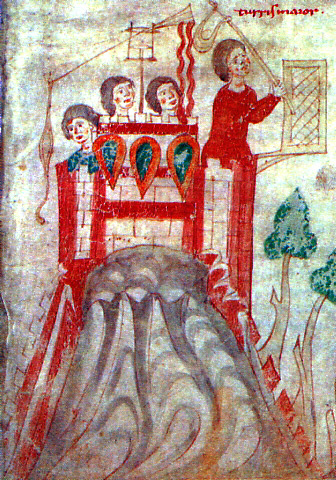
12th-century depiction of a traction trebuchet (also called a perrier) next to a staff slinger

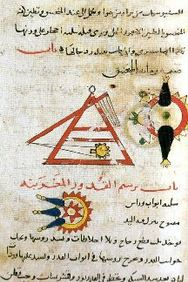
Muslim traction trebuchet, 1285

=== Counterweight trebuchet ===
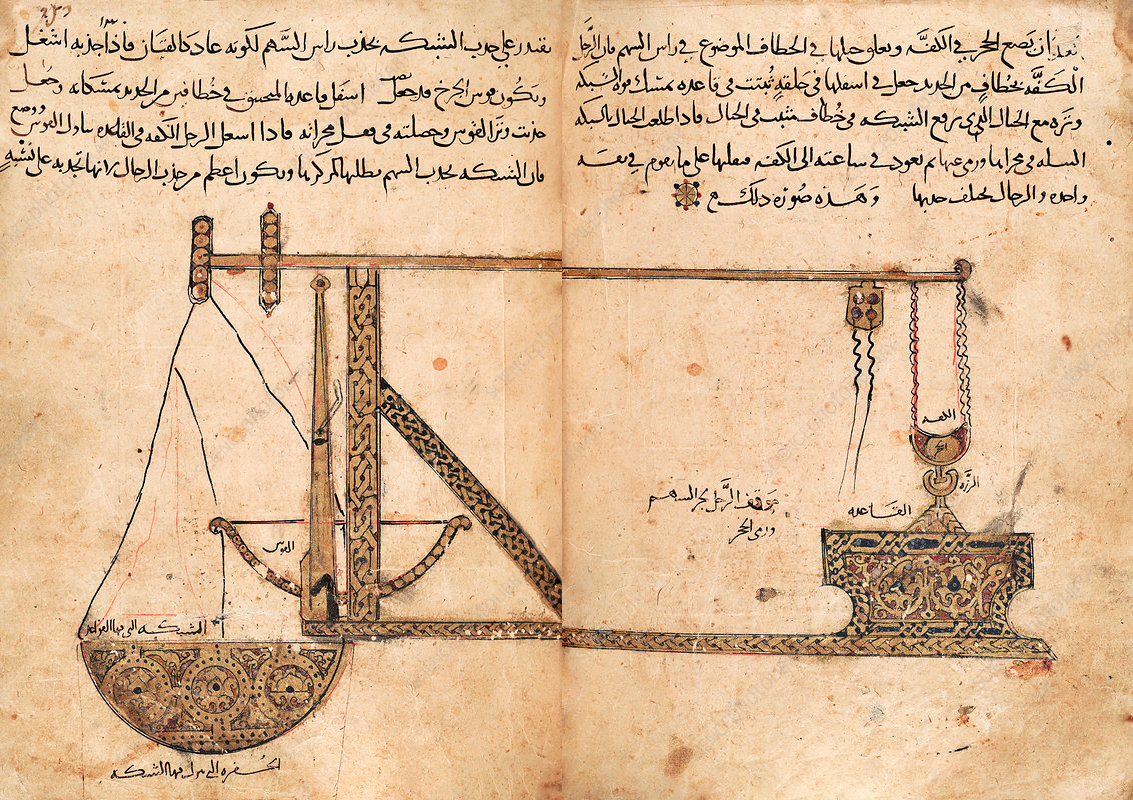
The earliest known depiction of a counterweight trebuchet, by Mardi ibn Ali al-Tarsusi, c. 1187

==== Origins ====
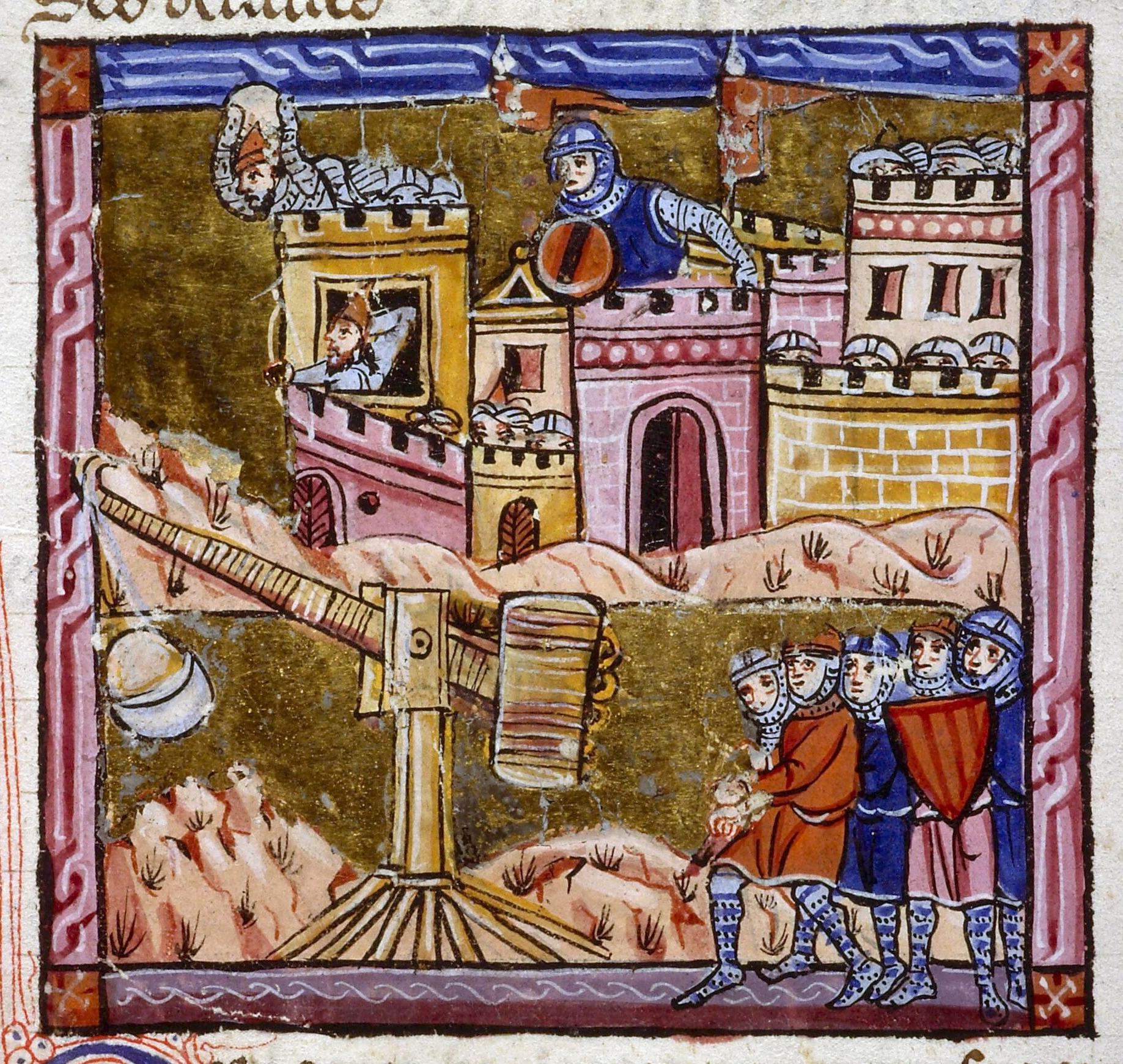
Counterweight trebuchet, c. 1280

Siege of Baghdad (1258) from the Jami' al-tawarikh, c. 1306-18

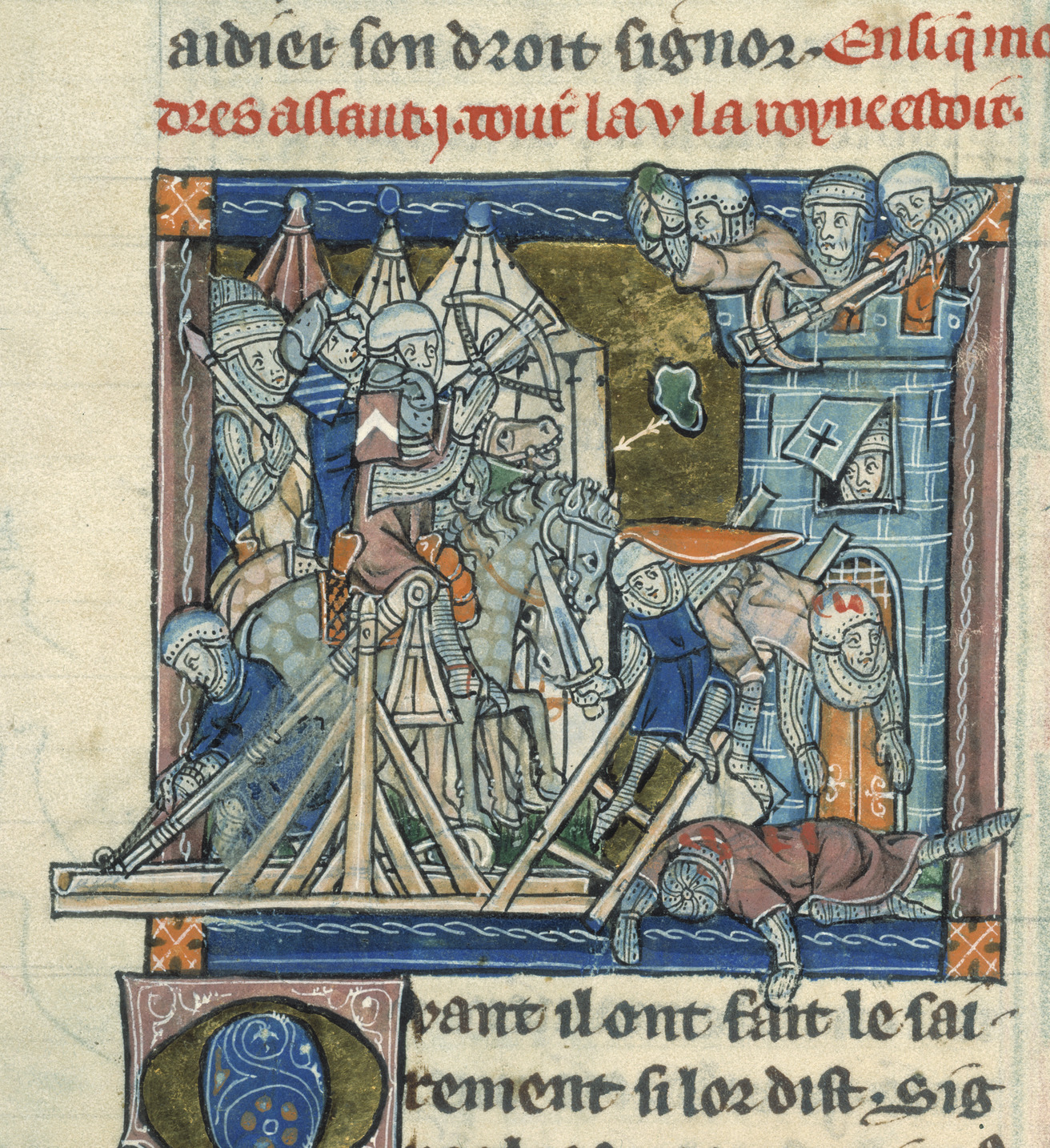
Counterweight trebuchet in the La Mort le Roi Artus, c. 1316

There is little to no consensus as to where and when the counterweight trebuchet, which has been described as the "most powerful weapon of the Middle Ages", was first developed. The earliest known description and illustration of a counterweight trebuchet comes from a commentary on the conquests of Saladin by Mardi ibn Ali al-Tarsusi in 1187. However cases for the existence of both European and Muslim counterweight trebuchets prior to 1187 have been made. In 1090, Khalaf ibn Mula'ib threw out a man from the citadel in Salamiya with a machine and in the early 12th century, Muslim siege engines were able to breach crusader fortifications. David Nicolle argues that these events could have only been possible with the use of counterweight trebuchets.

Although al-Tarsusi provided the first description and illustration of a counterweight trebuchet, the text implies that the engine was not new and had previously been built. Al-Tarsusi referred to the counterweight trebuchet as the "Persian" trebuchet whereas the "Frankish" trebuchet was a light traction engine. Later during the 13th century, Muslims used manjaniq maghribi (Western trebuchet) and manjaniq ifranji (Frankish trebuchet) to refer to counterweight trebuchets. Paul E. Chevedden suggests that manjaniq maghribi was used to describe hinged counterweight engines in contrast to previous fixed or hanging counterweight trebuchets. Sometimes counterweight trebuchets are separated into two or three different categories based on how their counterweights are attached. These being fixed, hanging, and hinged counterweights. A fixed counterweight is an intrinsic part of the swinging arm and its trajectory is circular. Hanging counterweights hang below the arm and drop vertically. Hinged counterweights are attached to the arm by a swinging joint. Some fixed counterweights also had a hinged component. The type described by al-Tarsusi was a hanging counterweight. Writing in 1280, Giles of Rome claimed that hinged counterweight trebuchets had a greater range than fixed counterweight types.

Chevedden argues that counterweight trebuchets appeared prior to 1187 in Europe based on what might have been counterweight trebuchets in earlier sources. The 12th-century Byzantine historian Niketas Choniates may have been referring to a counterweight trebuchet when he described one equipped with a windlass, which is only useful to counterweight machines, at the siege of Zevgminon in 1165. However the source for this was written in the 1180s to 1190s and Niketas may have been placing the engine of his own time anachronistically into the past. At the siege of Nicaea in 1097 the Byzantine emperor Alexios I Komnenos reportedly invented new pieces of heavy artillery which deviated from the conventional design and made a deep impression on everyone. Illustrations produced later in 1270 depicted fixed counterweight trebuchets used at the siege. Possible references to counterweight trebuchets also appear for the second siege of Tyre in 1124, where the crusaders reportedly made use of "great trebuchets". However the sources for this siege, Fulcher of Chartres and William of Tyre, only mention machinae and machinae iaculatoriae that were later translated as perrieres and mangoniaux in the Estoire d'Eracles. Chevedden argues that given the references to new and better trebuchets that by the 1120–30s, the counterweight trebuchet was being used in a variety of places by different peoples such as the crusader states, the Normans of Sicily and the Seljuks.

The earliest solid reference to a "trebuchet" in European sources dates to the siege of Castelnuovo Bocca d'Adda in 1199. However it is unclear if this referred to counterweight trebuchets since the author did not specify what engine was used and described the machine as fairly light. They may have been used in Germany from around 1205. Only in the late 1210s do references to "trebuchet", describing more powerful engines and different components, more closely align with the features of a counterweight trebuchet. Some of these more powerful engines may have just been traction trebuchets, as one was described being pulled by ten thousand. At the siege of Toulouse (1217–1218), trabuquets were mentioned to have been deployed, but the siege engine depicted at the tomb of Simon de Montfort, who was killed by artillery at the siege, is a traction trebuchet. Though soon after, clear evidence of counterweight machines appeared. According to the Song of the Albigensian Crusade, the defenders "ran to the ropes and wound the trebuchets", and to shoot the machine, they "then released their ropes." They were used in England at least by 1217 and in Iberia shortly after 1218. By the 1230s the counterweight trebuchet was a common item in siege warfare. Despite the lack of clearly definable terms in the late 12th and early 13th centuries, it is likely that both Muslims and Europeans already had working knowledge of the counterweight trebuchet beforehand. From the First Crusade (1096–1099) onward, there does not appear to be any discernible difference in the technology of siege engines employed by Muslim and Frankish forces, and by the Third Crusade (1189–1192), both sides seemed well acquainted with the enemy's siege weapons, which "appear to have been remarkably similar."

The counterweight trebuchet and crossbows gave crusaders a technological advantage, as both appear to have been unknown to inhabitants of the Baltic region. Russian forces from Pskov are mentioned in 1206 as attempting to build their own trebuchet "in the way of the Germans" to use against the pagan Estonians; however, "they did not know the art of throwing stones", and thus it backfired and injured their own forces. The technology continued to spread quickly, as Danish crusaders gave a small trebuchet to their converted allies in northern Estonia. The pagans of Saaremaa were also allowed to study the trebuchet in 1222, leading them to build 17 trebuchets that were subsequently used in revolts against the crusaders.

==== China ====
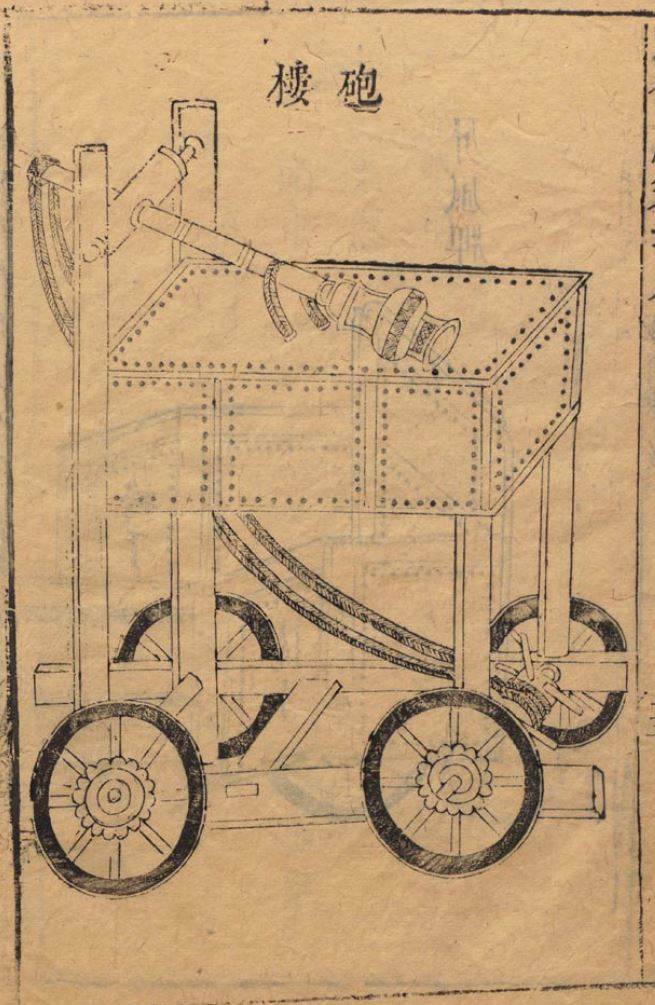
A Chinese counterweight trebuchet packed for transport, from the Wubei Zhi, 17th c.

Counterweight trebuchets do not appear with certainty in Chinese historical records until about 1268. Prior to 1268, the counterweight trebuchet may have been used in 1232 by the Jurchen Jin commander Qiang Shen. Qiang invented a device called the "Arresting Trebuchet" which only needed a few men to work it, and could hurl great stones more than a hundred paces, further than even the strongest traction trebuchet. However no other details on the machine are given. Qiang died the following year and no further references to the Arresting Trebuchet appear. The earliest definite mention of the counterweight trebuchet in China was in 1268, when the Mongols laid siege to Fancheng and Xiangyang. After failing to take the twin cities of Fancheng and Xiangyang for several years, collectively known as the siege of Fancheng and Xiangyang, the Mongol army brought in two Persian engineers to build hinged counterweight trebuchets. Known as the Huihui trebuchet (回回砲, where "huihui" is a loose slang referring to any Muslims), or Xiangyang trebuchet (襄陽砲) because they were first encountered in that battle. Ismail and Al-aud-Din travelled to South China from Iraq and built trebuchets for the siege. Chinese and Muslim engineers operated artillery and siege engines for the Mongol armies. By 1283, counterweight trebuchets were also used in Southeast Asia by the Chams against the Yuan dynasty.

The design of the Muslim trebuchets came originally from the Muslim countries, and they were more powerful than ordinary trebuchets. In the case of the largest ones, the wooden framework stood above a hole in the ground. The projectiles were several feet in diameter, and when they fell to the earth they made a hole three or four feet deep. [W]hen [the artillerists] wanted to hurl them to a great range, they added weight [to the counterpoise] and set it further back [on the arm;] when they needed only a shorter distance, they set it forward, nearer [the fulcrum].

— Zheng Sixiao

==== Function ====
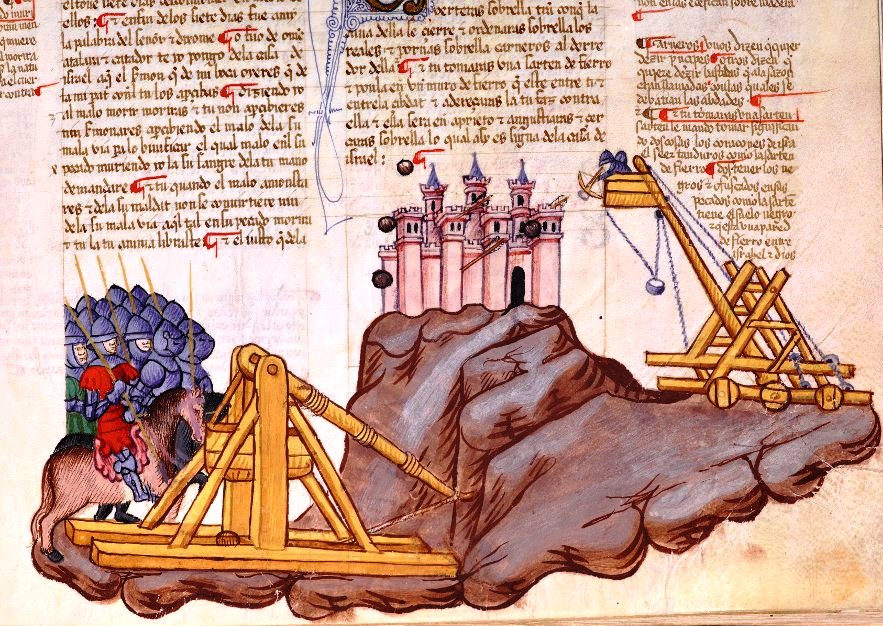
Counterweight trebuchet, 1430

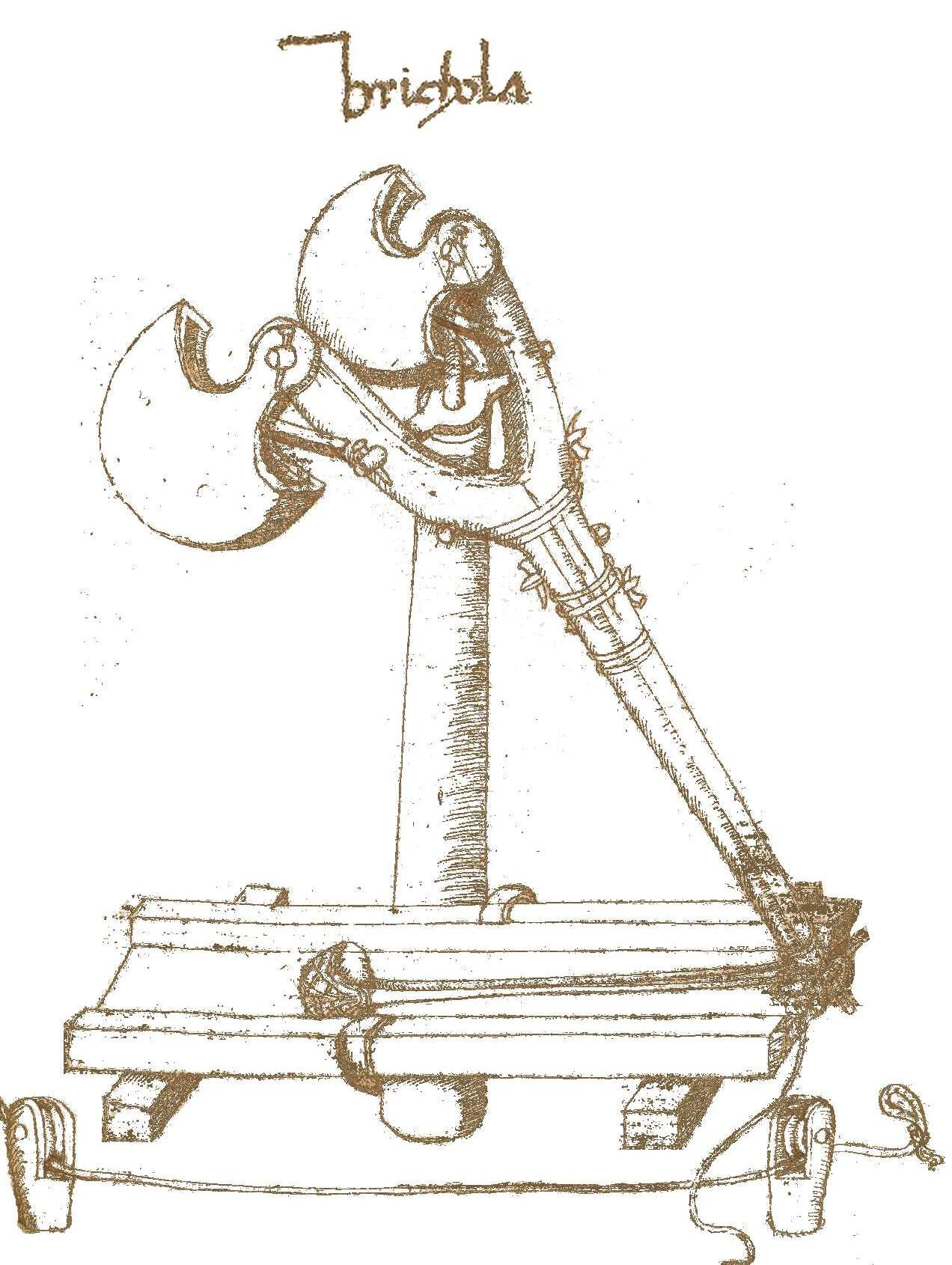
Double counterweight trebuchet mounted on a pole, called "bricola", 1433

While some historians have described the counterweight trebuchet as a type of medieval super weapon, other historians have urged caution in overemphasizing its destructive capability. On the side of the counterweight engine as a medieval military revolution, historians such as Sydney Toy, Paul Chevedden, and Hugh Kennedy consider its power to have caused significant changes in medieval warfare. This line of thought suggests that rams were abandoned due to the effectiveness of the counterweight trebuchet, which was capable of reducing "any fortress to rubble". Accordingly, traditional fortifications became obsolete and had to be improved with new architectural structures to support defensive counterweight trebuchets. In southern France during the Albigensian Crusade, sieges were a last resort and negotiations for surrender were common. In these instances, trebuchets were used to threaten or bombard enemy fortifications and ensure victory. On the side of caution, historians such as John France, Christopher Marshall, and Michael Fulton emphasize the still considerable difficulty of reducing fortifications with siege artillery. Examples of the failure of siege artillery include the lack of evidence that artillery ever threatened the defenses of Kerak Castle between 1170 and 1188. Marshall maintains that "the methods of attack and defence remained largely the same through the thirteenth century as they had been during the twelfth." Reservations on the counterweight trebuchet's destructive capability were expressed by Viollet-le-Duc, who "asserted that even counterweight-powered artillery could do little more than destroy crenellations, clear defenders from parapets and target the machines of the besieged."

In spite of the evidence regarding increasingly powerful counterweight trebuchets during the 13th century, "it remains an important consideration that not one of these appears to have effected a breach that directly led to the fall of a stronghold." In 1220, Al-Mu'azzam Isa laid siege to Atlit with a trabuculus, three petrariae, and four mangonelli but could not penetrate past the outer wall, which was soft but thick. As late as the siege of Acre (1291), where the Mamluk Sultanate fielded 72 or 92 trebuchets, including 14 or 15 counterweight trebuchets and the remaining traction types, they were never able to fulfill a breaching role. The Mamluks entered the city by sapping the northeast corner of the outer wall. Though stone projectiles of substantial size (~66 kilograms (146 lb)) have been found at Acre, located near the site of the siege and likely used by the Mamluks, surviving walls of a 13th-century Montmusard tower are no more than one meter thick. There is no indication that the thickness of fortress walls increased exponentially rather than a modest increase of 0.5–1 m (1 ft 8 in – 3 ft 3 in) between the 12th and 13th century. The Templar of Tyre described the faster firing traction trebuchets as more dangerous to the defenders than the counterweight ones. The Song dynasty described countermeasures against counterweight trebuchets that prevented them from damaging towers and houses: "an extraordinary method was invented of neutralising the effects of the enemy's trebuchets. Ropes of rice straw four inches thick and thirty-four feet long were joined together twenty at a time, draped on to the buildings from top to bottom, and covered with [wet] clay. Then neither the incendiary arrows, nor bombs [huo pao] from trebuchets, nor even stones of a hundred jun caused any damage to the towers and houses."

The counterweight trebuchet did not completely replace the traction trebuchet. Despite its greater range, counterweight trebuchets had to be constructed close to the site of the siege unlike traction trebuchets, which were smaller, lighter, cheaper, and easier to take apart and put back together again where necessary. The superiority of the counterweight trebuchet was not clear cut. Of this, the Hongwu Emperor stated in 1388: "The old type of trebuchet was really more convenient. If you have a hundred of those machines, then when you are ready to march, each wooden pole can be carried by only four men. Then when you reach your destination, you encircle the city, set them up, and start shooting!" The traction trebuchet continued to serve as an anti-personnel weapon. The Norwegian text of 1240, Speculum regale, explicitly states this division of functions. Traction trebuchets were to be used for hitting people in undefended areas. At the siege of Acre (1291), both traction and counterweight trebuchets were used. The traction trebuchets provided cover fire while the counterweight trebuchets destroyed the city's fortifications. The counterweight-trebuchet could also be used for cover fire and as an anti-personnel weapon. King James I of Aragon employed this as a defensive tactic in many fortified structures and towns which proved effective. Trebuchets could cause mass casualties due to the destruction of structures. During an assault on Muntcada by King James I, a trebuchet was used to target a tower, destroying the structure and causing the consequential deaths of civilians and livestock. But typically the counterweight trebuchet was used against battlements such as parapets, other defensive structures, and the lower section of walls due to its greater accuracy and longer range, which was how it was employed by the Kingdom of Aragon.

Rather than replace traction trebuchets, counterweight trebuchets supplemented them in a different role. Their slower shooting rate and greater mass made them more difficult to reposition, or even yaw, leaving few incentives to employ a small counterweight engine rather than a comparable traction type. Although less accurate, traction trebuchets might be expected to achieve the same result, albeit with more shots, in a similar amount of time. Accordingly, it was only profitable to employ counterweight trebuchets if they were capable of harnessing noticeably more energy, allowing them to throw significantly larger stones or similarly sized stones greater distances.

— Michael S. Fulton

There is some evidence that the counterweight trebuchet could be transported. Armies employed a magister tormentorum ('master of trebuchets') for the reconstruction of trebuchets after they were deconstructed for transportation to their destination, whether on carts or by ship. They could also be equipped with their own wheels, as shown in two 17th- and 18th-century Chinese illustrations, which are also the only Chinese depictions of counterweight trebuchets on land. According to Liang Jieming, the "illustration shows ... its throwing arm disassembled, its counterweight locked with supporting braces, and prepped for transport and not in battle deployment." However, according to Joseph Needham, the large tank in the middle was the counterweight, while the bulb at the end of the arm was for adjusting between fixed and swinging counterweights. Both Liang and Needham note that the illustrations are poorly drawn and confusing, leading to mislabeling.

The counterweight and traction trebuchets were phased out around the mid-15th century in favor of gunpowder weapons.

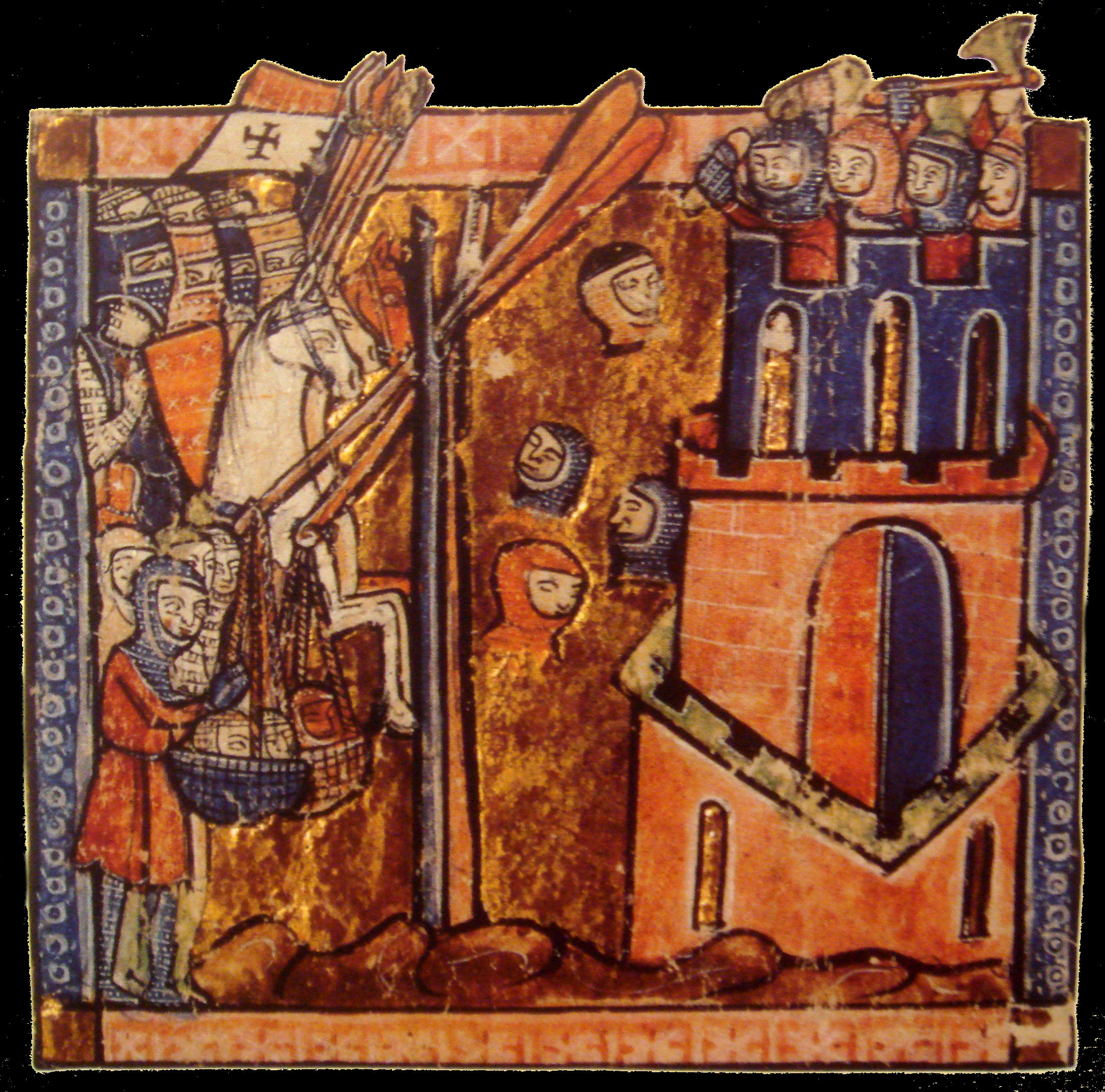
Counterweight trebuchets at the siege of Nicaea (1097), c. 1270

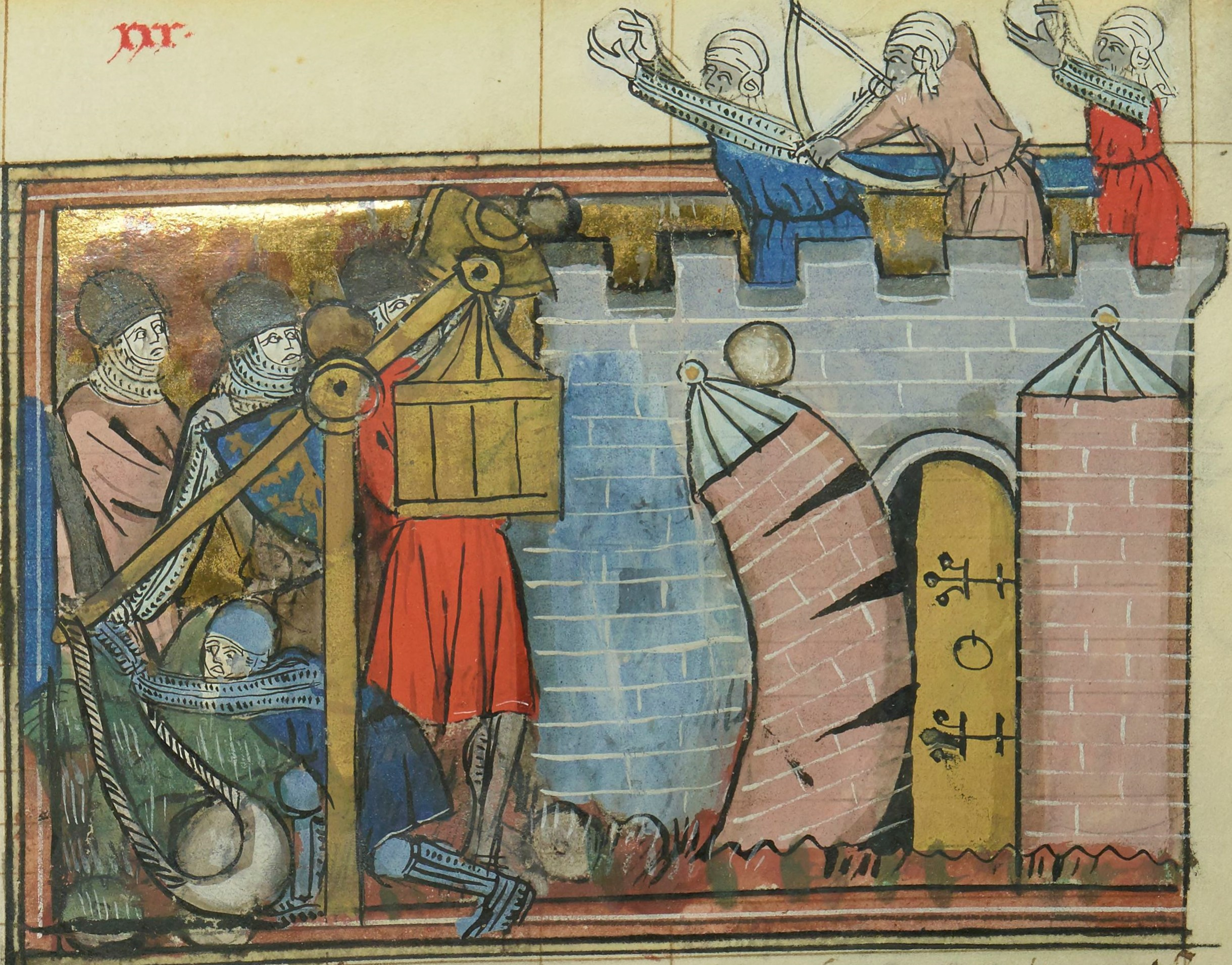
Counterweight trebuchet at the siege of Nicaea (1097), 1337

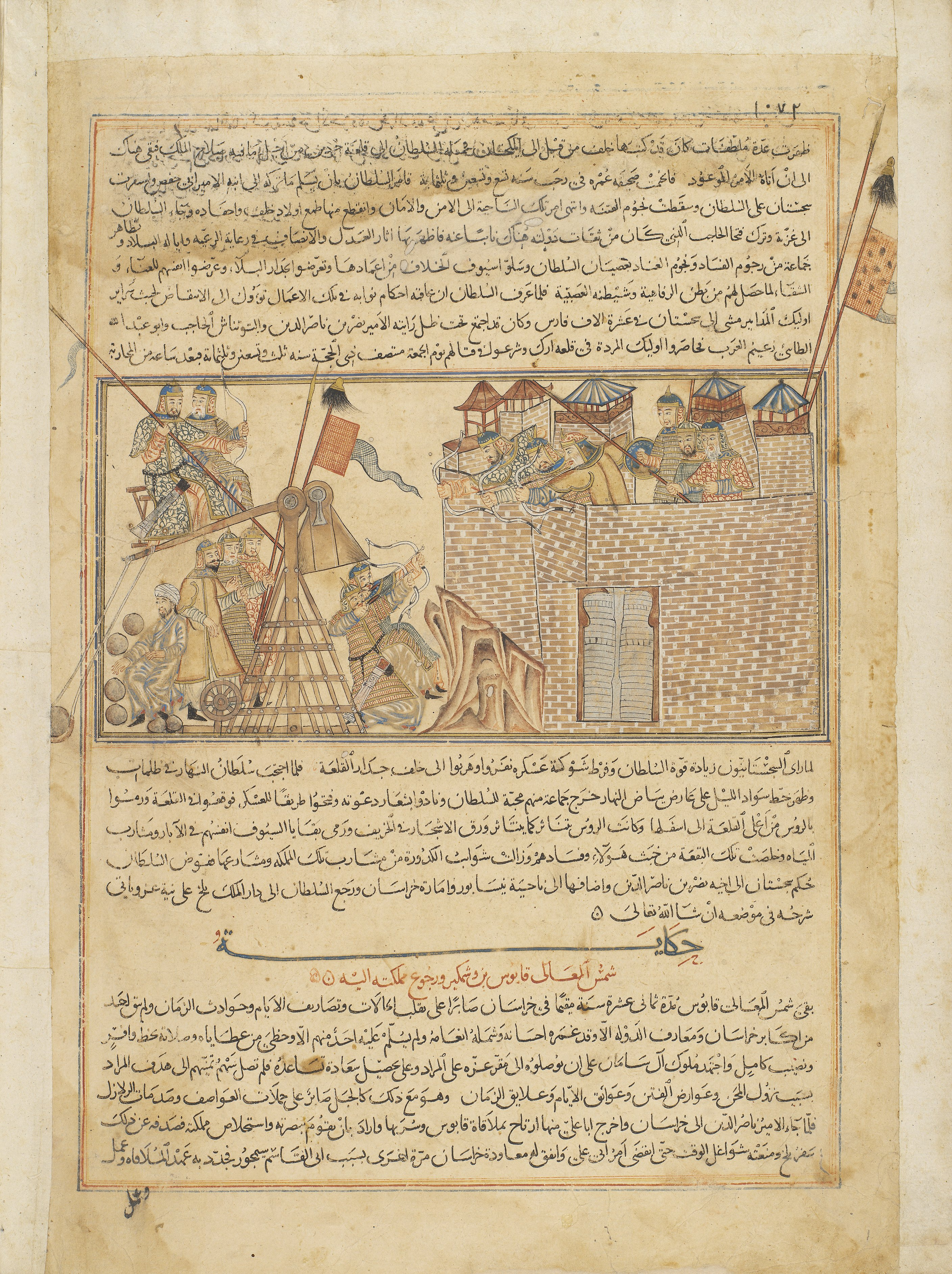
Mahmud of Ghazni attacks the rebel fortress (Arg) of Zaranj in Sijistan (Nimruz province) in 1003 AD, from the Jami' al-tawarikh, c. 1306–18

Fortress with trebuchet, from Yusuf ibn Urunbugha al-Zaradkash's Kitāb anīq fī al-manājanīq

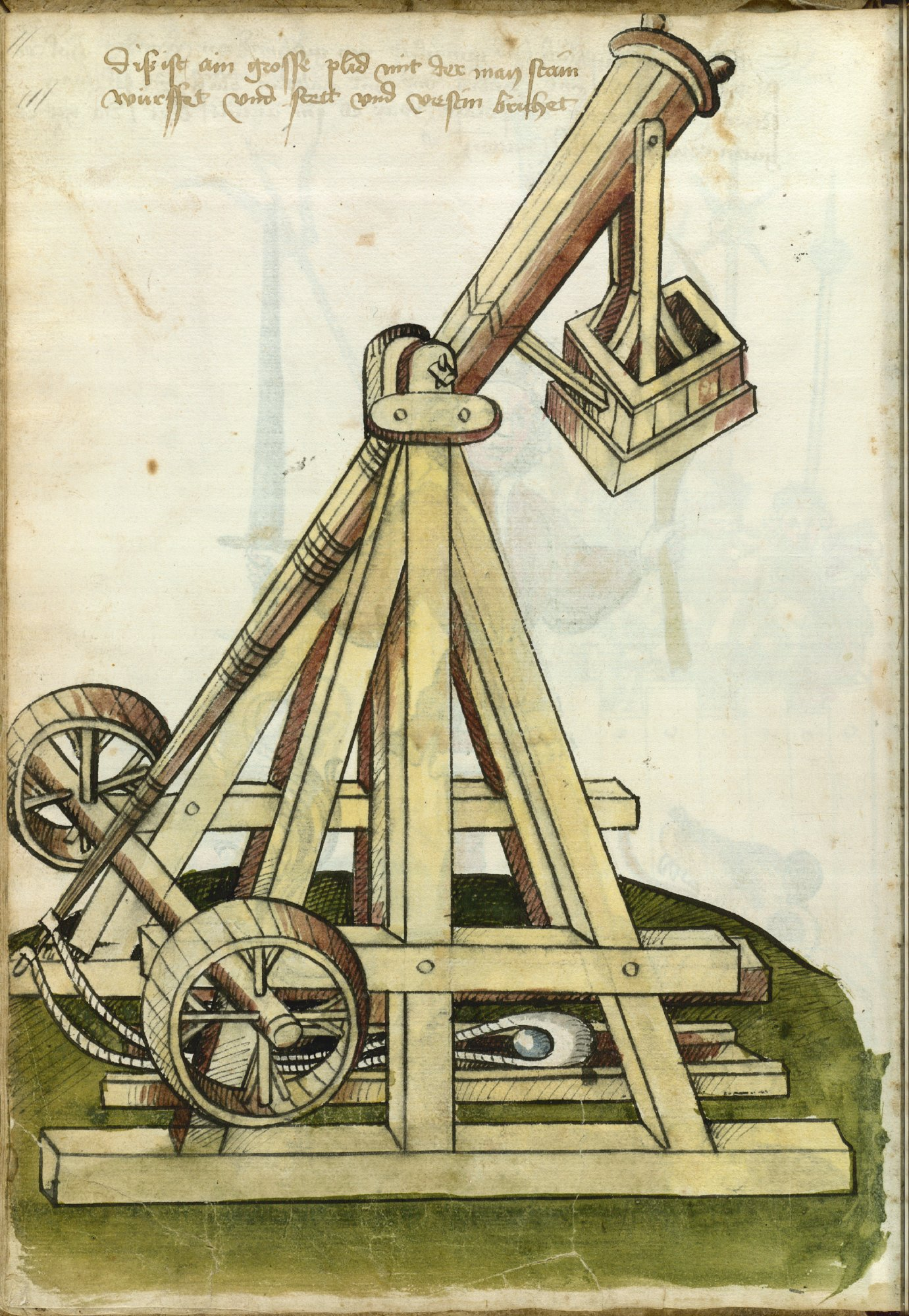
15th-century depiction of a counterweight trebuchet

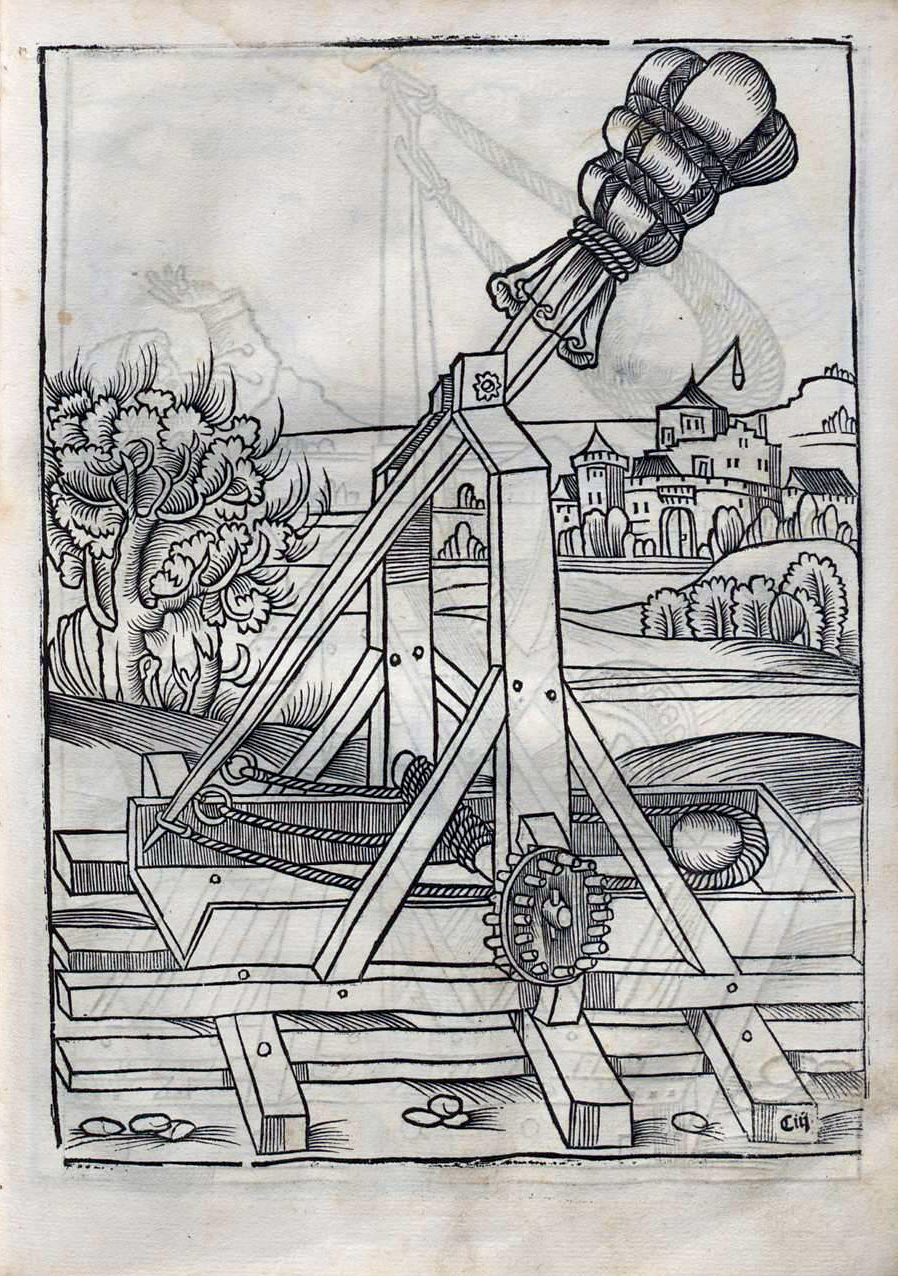
16th-century depiction of a counterweight trebuchet

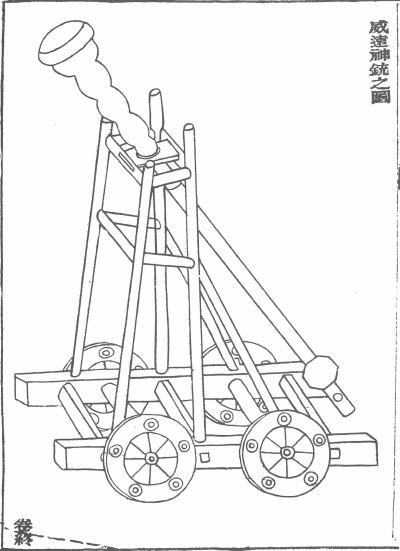
Possibly a counterweight trebuchet (however text says cannon) from the Chinese encyclopedia Gujin Tushu Jicheng, 1726

Early 18th-century depiction of a Chinese ship armed with three counterweight trebuchets

=== Decline of military use ===
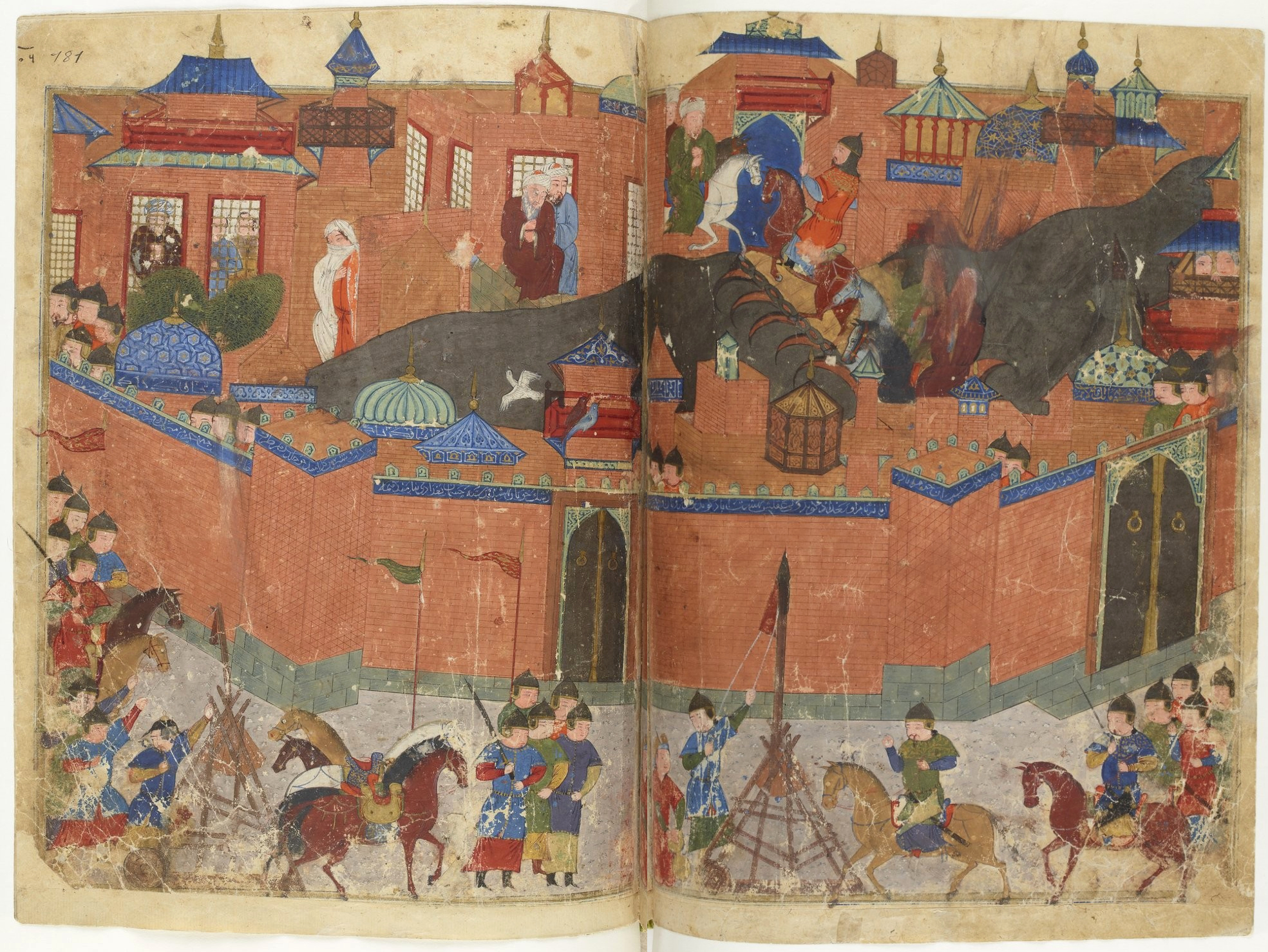
Siege of Baghdad (1258), c. 1430

With the introduction of gunpowder, the trebuchet began to lose its place as the siege engine of choice to the cannon. Trebuchets were still used both at the siege of Burgos (1475–1476) and siege of Rhodes (1480).

One of the last recorded military uses was by Hernán Cortés, at the 1521 siege of the Aztec capital Tenochtitlán. Accounts of the attack note that its use was motivated by the limited supply of gunpowder. The attempt was reportedly unsuccessful: the first projectile landed on the trebuchet itself, destroying it.

In China, the last time trebuchets were seriously considered for military purposes was in 1480. Not much is heard of them afterwards.

== Other trebuchets ==
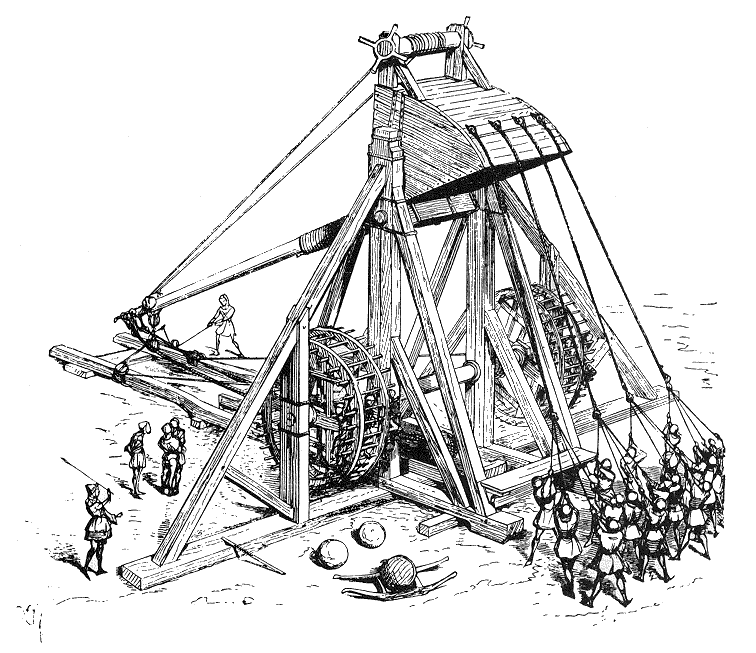
Hybrid trebuchet

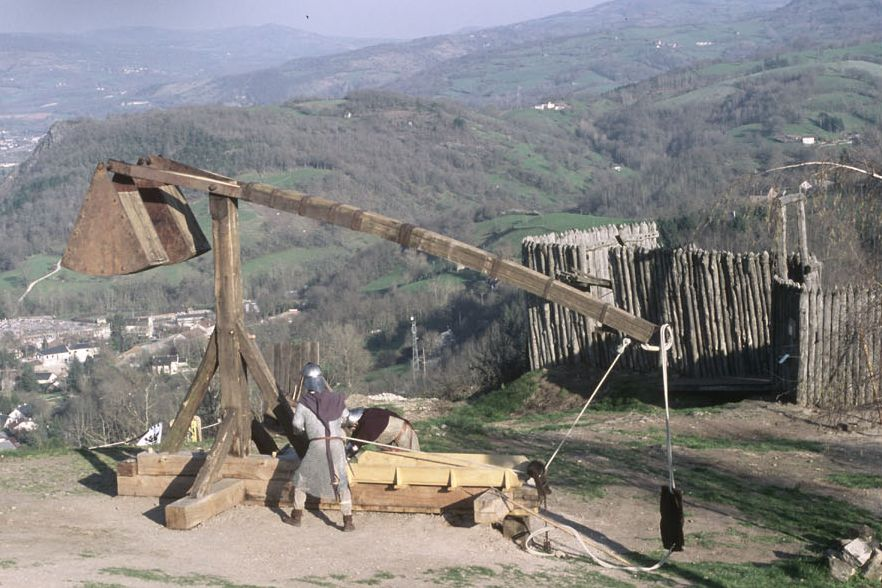
A couillard

=== Hand-trebuchet ===
The hand-trebuchet (Greek: χειρομάγγανον, cheiromanganon) was a staff sling mounted on a pole using a lever mechanism to propel projectiles. Basically a one-man traction trebuchet, it was used by troops of emperor Nikephoros II Phokas around 965 to disrupt enemy formations in the open field. It was also mentioned in the Taktika of general Nikephoros Ouranos (c. 1000), and listed in De obsidione toleranda (author anonymous) as a form of artillery.

In China, the hand-trebuchet (shoupao) was invented by Liu Yongxi and presented to the emperor in 1002. It was a pole with a pin at its upper end that acted as a fulcrum for the arm. The pole was used as a shot for fixing in the ground and the user could then throw missiles at the enemy from a static position.

=== Hybrid trebuchet ===
According to Paul E. Chevedden, a hybrid trebuchet existed that used both counterweight and human propulsion. However no illustrations or descriptions of the device exist from the time when they were supposed to have been used. The entire argument for the existence of hybrid trebuchets rests on accounts of increasingly more effective siege weapons. Peter Purton suggests that this was simply because the machines became larger. The earliest depiction of a hybrid trebuchet is dated to 1462, when trebuchets had already become obsolete due to cannons.

=== Couillard ===
The couillard is a smaller version of a counterweight trebuchet with a single frame instead of the usual double "A" frames. The counterweight is split into two halves to avoid hitting the center frame.

== Comparison of different artillery weapons ==
=== Roman torsion engines ===
Weapon	Projectile weight: kilograms (pounds)	Range: meters (feet)
Ballista (reconstruction)	0.6 kg (1.3 lb) (stone)/0.4 kg (0.88 lb) (lead)	180 m (590 ft)/300 m (980 ft)
Ballista (reconstruction)	26 kg (57 lb)	82 m (269 ft)
Onager (reconstruction)		130–275 m (427–902 ft) (no damage to walls over 130 m (430 ft))
Onager (Vitruvius reconstruction)	26 kg (57 lb)	90 m (300 ft)

=== Chinese trebuchets ===
Weapon	Crew	Projectile weight: kilograms (pounds)	Range: meters (feet)
Whirlwind trebuchet	50 (rotating)	1.8 kg (4.0 lb)	78 m (256 ft)
Crouching tiger trebuchet	70 (rotating)	7.25 kg (16.0 lb)	78 m (256 ft)
Four footed (one arm) trebuchet	40 (rotating)	1.1 kg (2.4 lb)	78 m (256 ft)
Four footed (two arm) trebuchet	100 (rotating)	11.3 kg (25 lb)	120 m (390 ft)
Four footed (five arm) trebuchet	157 (rotating)	44.5 kg (98 lb)	78 m (256 ft)
Four footed (seven arm) trebuchet	250 (rotating)	56.7 kg (125 lb)	78 m (256 ft)
Counterweight trebuchet	10	~86 kg (190 lb)	200–275 m (656–902 ft)

=== Counterweight trebuchets (estimates) ===
Counterweight: kilograms (pounds)	Projectile weight: kilograms (pounds)	Range: meters (feet)
15,000 kg (33,000 lb)	60 kg (130 lb)	365 m (1,198 ft)
15,000 kg (33,000 lb)	100 kg (220 lb)	217 m (712 ft)
30,000 kg (66,000 lb)	100 kg (220 lb)	400 m (1,300 ft)
30,000 kg (66,000 lb)	250 kg (550 lb)	160 m (520 ft)
tens of thousands	900–1,360 kg (1,980–3,000 lb)	

=== Siege crossbows ===
Weapon	Crew	Draw weight: kilograms (pounds)	Range: meters (feet)
Mounted multi-bolt crossbow			460 m (1,510 ft)
Mounted single-bow crossbow	4–7		250–500 m (820–1,640 ft)
Mounted double-bow crossbow	10		350–520 m (1,150–1,710 ft)
Mounted triple-bow crossbow	20–100	950–1,200 kg (2,090–2,650 lb)	460–1,060 m (1,510–3,480 ft)
European siege crossbow (15th century)		545 kg (1,202 lb)	364–420 m (1,194–1,378 ft)

=== Reconstructed traction trebuchets ===
Pullers	Projectile weight: kilograms (pounds)	Shots per minute	Max range: meters (feet)
6-9	5–15 kg (11–33 lb)		~100 m (330 ft)
14	3.1 kg (6.8 lb)		145 m (476 ft)
20	1.9 kg (4.2 lb)	4–6	137 m (449 ft)

=== Reconstructed counterweight trebuchets ===
Counterweight: kilograms (pounds)	Projectile weight: kilograms (pounds)	Range: meters (feet)
2,000 kg (4,400 lb)	12–15 kg (26–33 lb)	120–168 m (394–551 ft)
4,000 kg (8,800 lb)	8–12 kg (18–26 lb)	445 m (1,460 ft)
4,000 kg (8,800 lb)	100 kg (220 lb)	185 m (607 ft)
6,000 kg (13,000 lb)	55 kg (121 lb)	320 m (1,050 ft)
6,000 kg (13,000 lb)	100 kg (220 lb)	200 m (660 ft)
30,000 kg (66,000 lb)	476 kg (1,049 lb)	80 m (260 ft)

== Modern use ==
=== Recreation and education ===
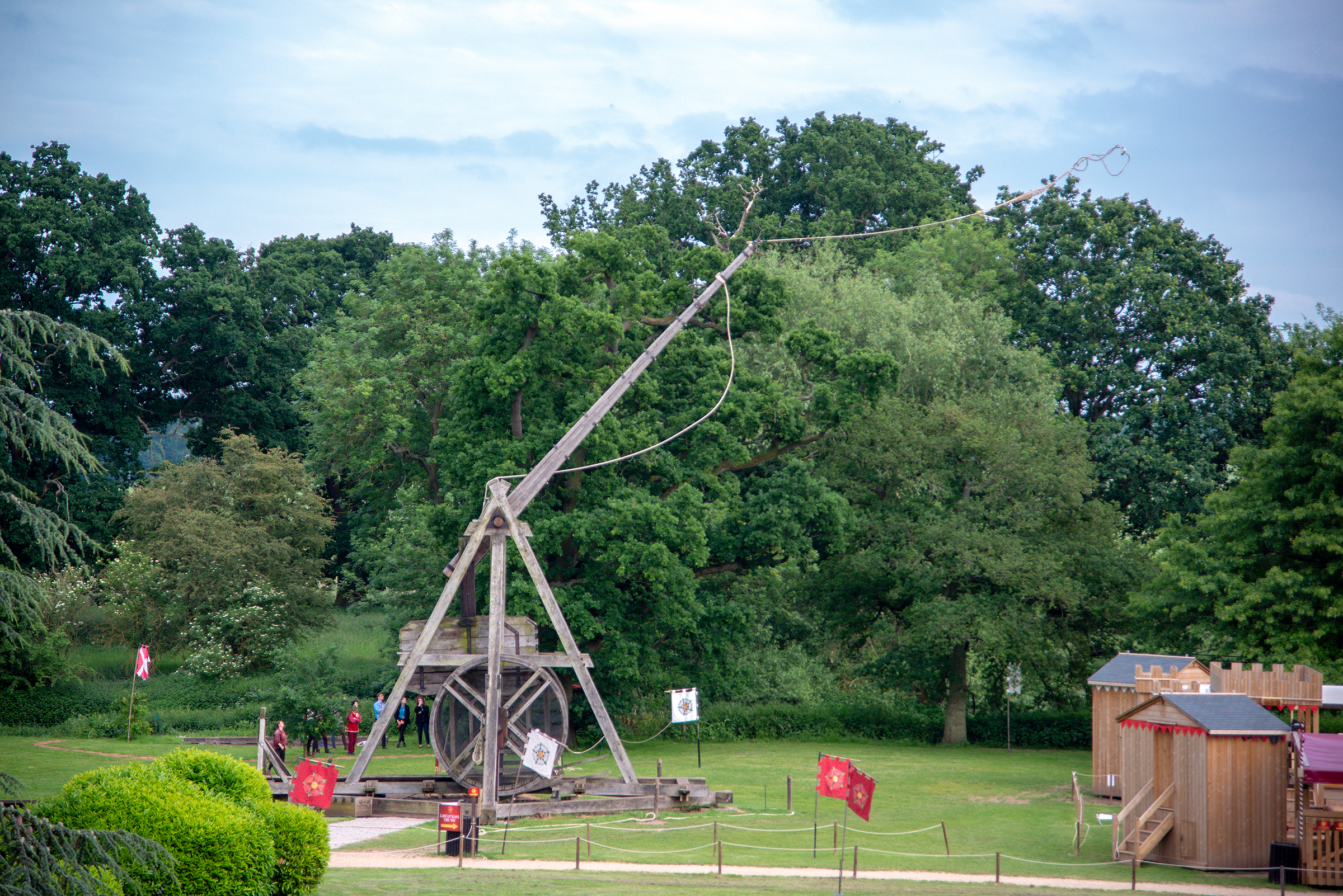
A functioning trebuchet at Warwick Castle (England) based on drawings from the 13th century

2012 demonstration of the Warwick Castle trebuchet (launch at 10:30)

Most trebuchet use in recent centuries has been for recreational or educational, rather than military purposes. New machines have been constructed and old ones restored by living history enthusiasts, for historical re-enactments, and use in other historical celebrations. As their construction is substantially simpler than modern weapons, trebuchets also serve as the object of engineering challenges.

The methods of trebuchet construction were lost at the beginning of the 16th century. In 1984, the French engineer Renaud Beffeyte made the first modern reconstruction of a trebuchet, based on documents from 1324.

The largest currently-functioning trebuchet in the world is the 22,000-kilogram (49,000 lb) machine at Warwick Castle, England, constructed in 2005. Based on historical designs, it stands 18 metres (59 ft) tall and throws missiles typically 36 kg (80 lbs) up to 300 metres (980 ft). The trebuchet gained significant interest from numerous news sources when in 2015 a burning missile fired from the siege engine struck and damaged a Victorian-era boathouse situated at the River Avon close by, inadvertently demonstrating the weapon's power. It is built on the design of a similar trebuchet at Middelaldercentret in Denmark. In 1989, Middelaldercentret became the first place in the modern era to have a working trebuchet.

Trebuchets compete in one of the classifications of machines used to hurl pumpkins at the annual pumpkin chucking contest held in Sussex County, Delaware, U.S. The record-holder in that contest for trebuchets is the Yankee Siege II from New Hampshire, which at the 2013 WCPC Championship tossed a pumpkin 2835.8 ft (864.35 metres). The 51-foot-tall (16 m), 55,000-pound (25,000 kg) trebuchet flings the standard 8–10-pound (3.6–4.5 kg) pumpkins, specified for all entries in the WCPC competition.

A large trebuchet was tested in late 2017 in Belfast as part of the set for the television series Game of Thrones.

A large trebuchet based on Edward I's "Warwolf" was constructed for a scene in David Mackenzie's movie Outlaw King (2018) about Robert the Bruce, King of Scots. During the film, it hurls an incendiary projectile at Stirling Castle. It recreates the true story that it took some three months to build and Edward would not let his enemy surrender until he could use it.

In recent years several trebuchets has been created capable of throwing cars. In the episode "Carnage A Trois" in series 4 of The Grand Tour the presenters uses a trebuchet to allegedly sling a Citroën C3 Pluriel from the White Cliffs of Dover across the English Channel. The Stamford based YouTube personality and inventor Colin Furze created a 14-metre (46 ft) high trebuchet capable of throwing a washing machine in December 2020.

=== Developments ===
Although rarely used as a weapon today, trebuchets maintain the interest of professional and hobbyist engineers. One modern technological development, especially for the competitive pumpkin-hurling events, is the "floating arms" design. Instead of using the traditional axle fixed to a frame, these devices are mounted on wheels that roll on a track parallel to the ground, with a counterweight that falls directly downward upon release, allowing for greater efficiency by increasing the proportion of energy transferred to the projectile. A more radical design; Jonathan, Orion, and Emmerson Stapleton's "walking arm", described as "a stick falling over with a huge counterweight on top of the stick" debuted in 2016 and in 2018 won both the Grand Champion Best Design and Middleweight Open Division of the 10th annual Vermont Pumpkin Chuckin Festival. Another recent development is the "flywheel trebuchet", in which a flywheel is spun into rapid rotation to build up momentum before release.

=== Uses in activism and insurgency ===
In 2013, during the Syrian civil war, rebels were filmed using a trebuchet in the Battle of Aleppo. The trebuchet was used to project explosives at government troops.

In 2014, during the Hrushevskoho street riots in Ukraine, rioters used an improvised trebuchet to throw bricks and Molotov cocktails at the Berkut.

=== Uses in regular armies ===
In 2024, the IDF used a trebuchet to hurl flaming projectiles into Lebanon. IDF media stated the goal was to target natural features such as brush and thicket along the Lebanon-Israel border wall that hypothetically could have been used as cover by Hezbollah troops. The IDF later issued a response to suggest that the trebuchet's use was a "local initiative", instigated by a brigade that had not yet been deployed to Gaza, rather than a widely used tool in the Israeli military.

== Gallery ==
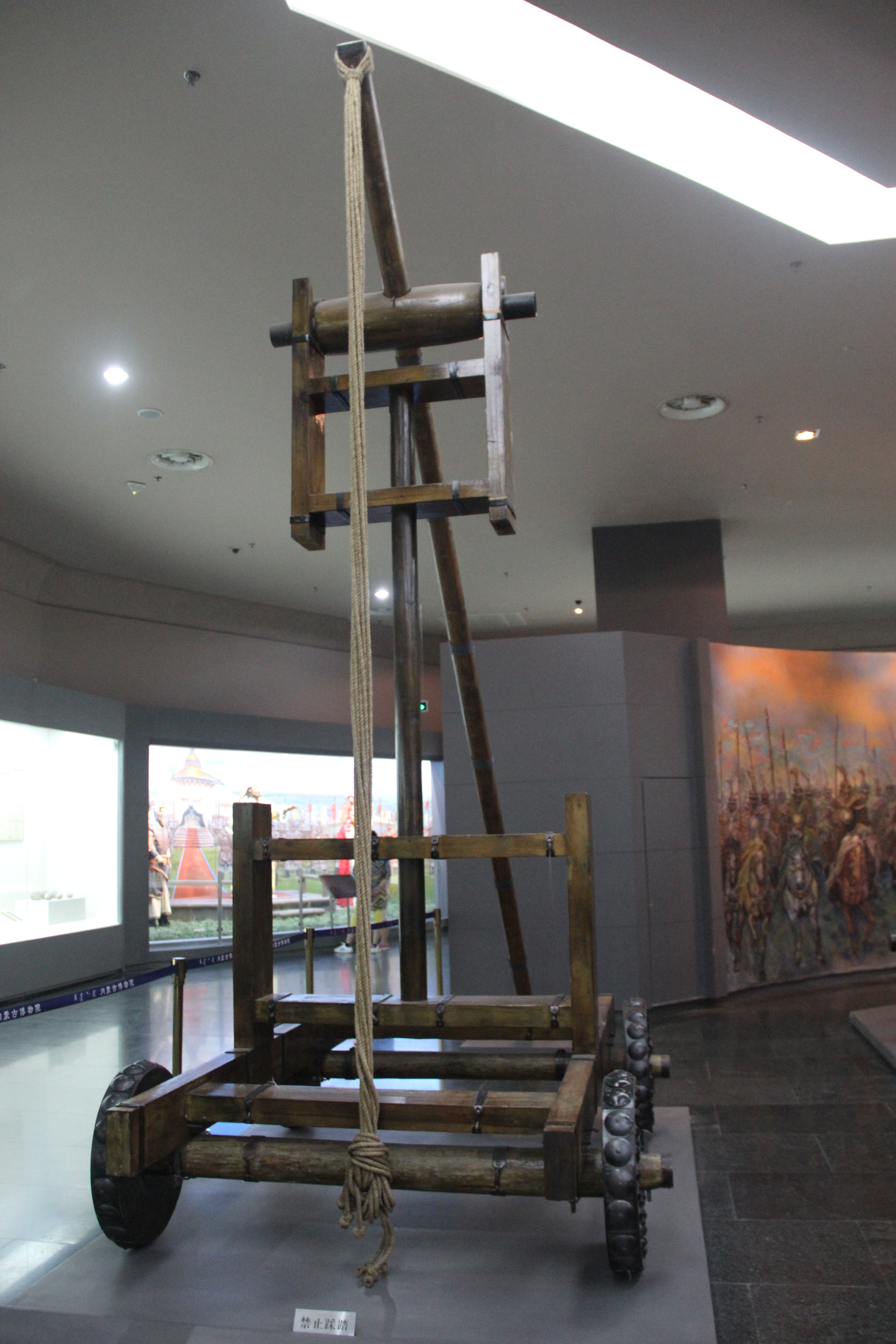
Modern recreation of a Mongol-era traction trebuchet, Inner Mongolia Museum

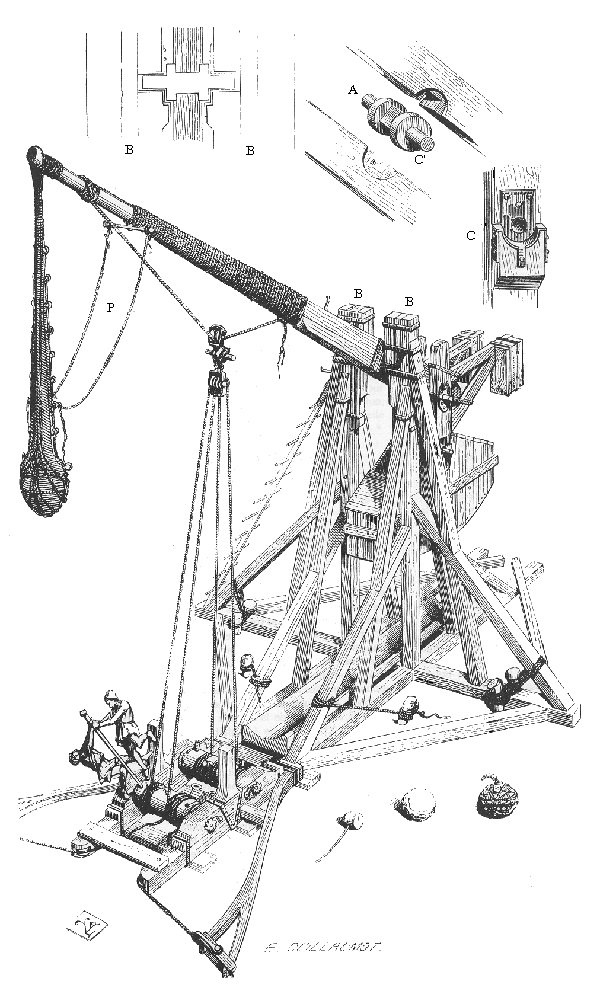
19th century French drawing of a medieval counterweight trebuchet

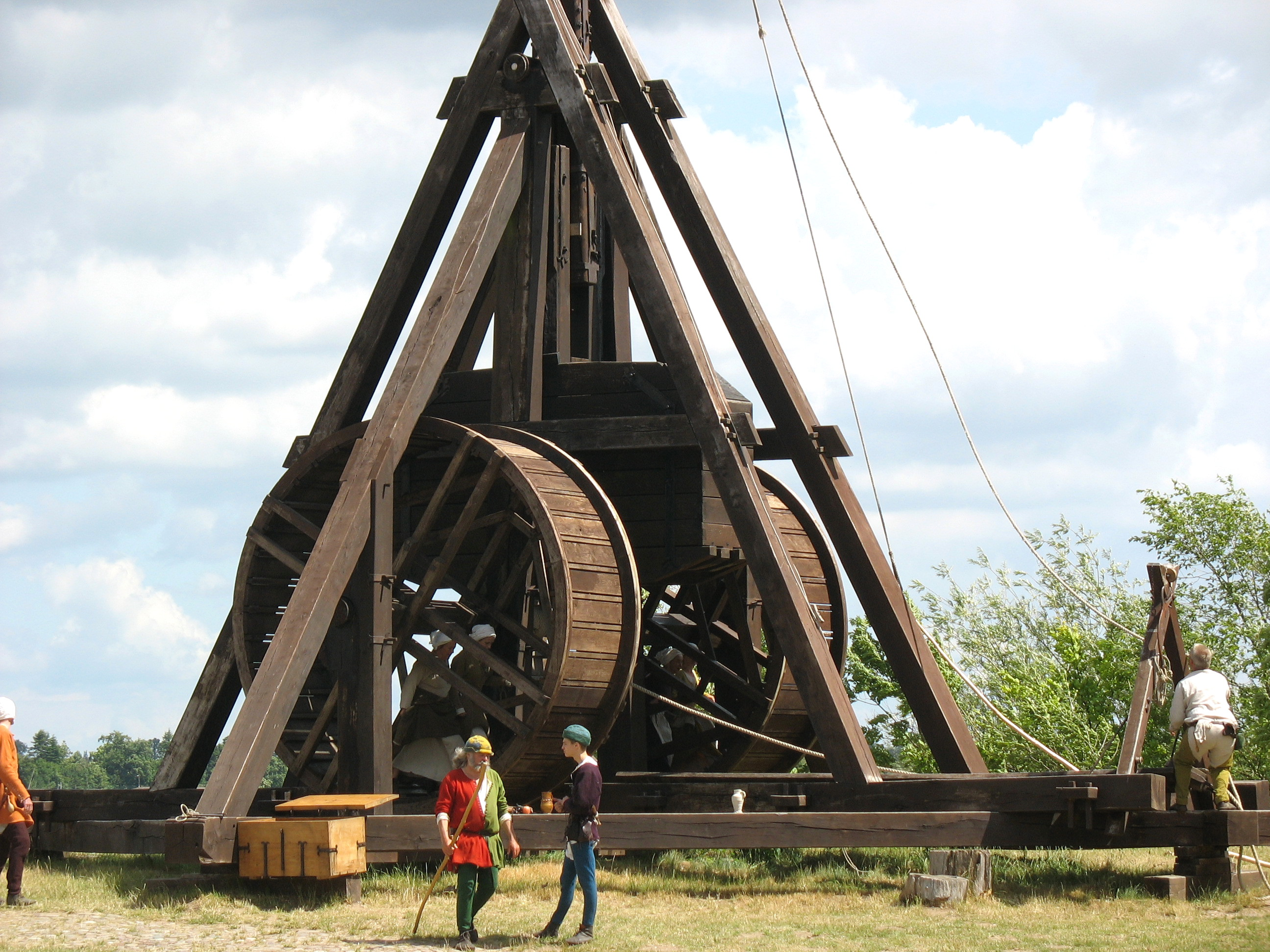
Trebuchet at Middelaldercentret, Denmark

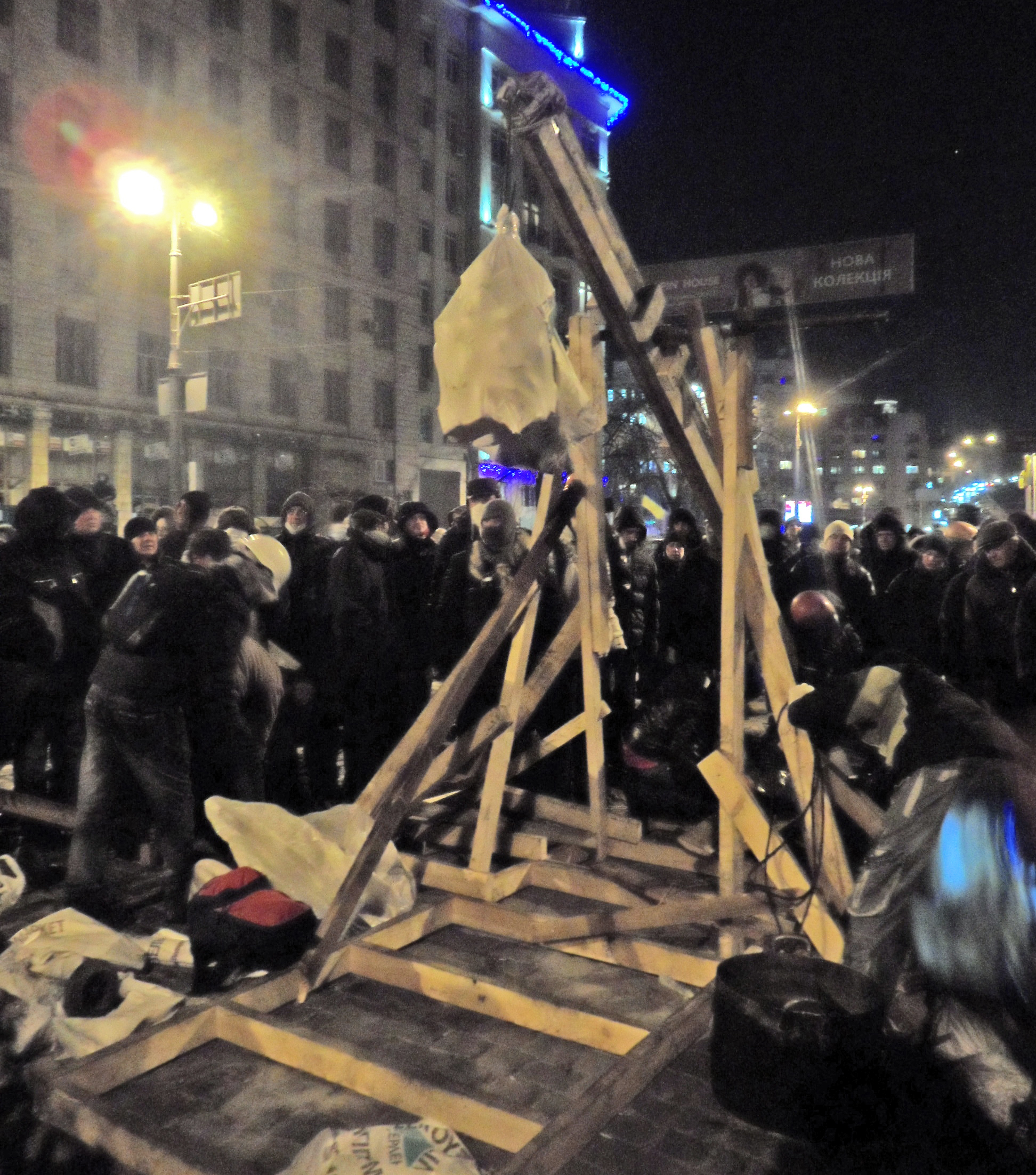
A modern improvised trebuchet erected by rioters in Hrushevskoho Street, Kyiv, in 2014, with the counterweight used to operate it visible

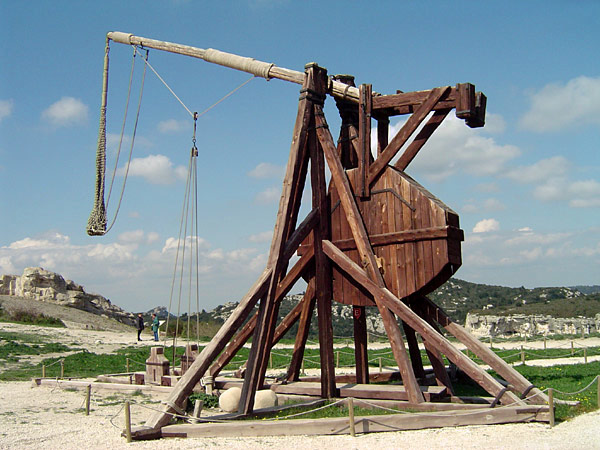
Counterweight trebuchet at Château des Baux, France

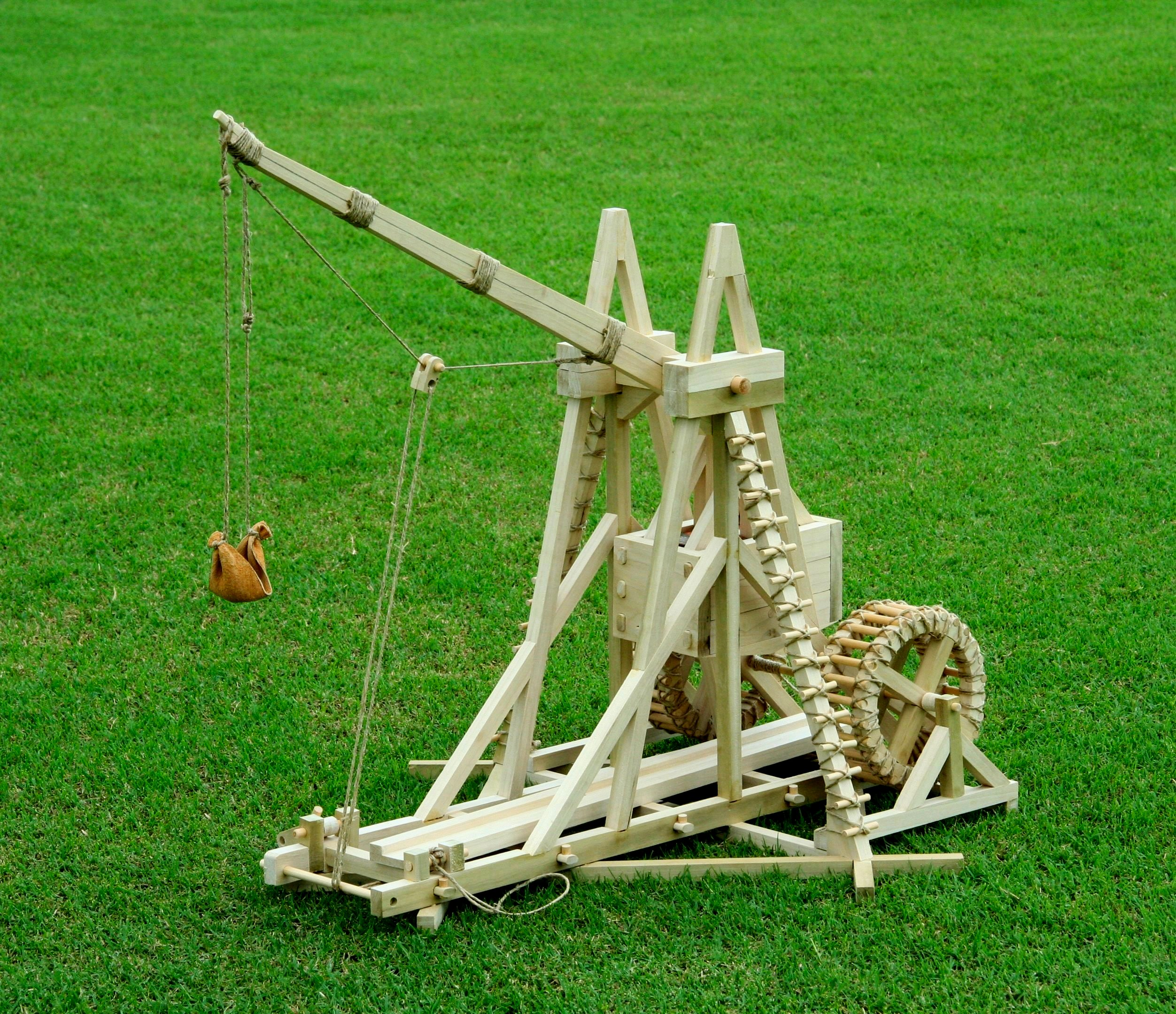
A scale model of a trebuchet, based on the design of the "Warwolf"

== See also ==
- Catapult
- Mangonel
- Medieval warfare
- Onager (siege weapon)
- Siege engine

== Bibliography ==
- Chevedden, Paul E.; et al. (July 1995). "The Trebuchet" (PDF). Scientific American. 273 (1): 66–71. Bibcode:1995SciAm.273a..66C. doi:10.1038/scientificamerican0795-66. Archived from the original (PDF) on 2012-01-11.
- Chevedden, Paul E. (2000). "The Invention of the Counterweight Trebuchet: A Study in Cultural Diffusion". Dumbarton Oaks Papers. 54: 71–116. doi:10.2307/1291833. JSTOR 1291833.
- Creighton, Oliver (2017). The Anarchy: War and Status in 12th-Century Landscapes of Conflict. United Kingdom: Liverpool University Press. doi:10.5949/LIVERPOOL/9781781382424.001.0001.
- Nicolle, David (2003), Medieval Siege Weapons 2, Osprey Publishing
- Dennis, George (1998). "Byzantine Heavy Artillery: The Helepolis". Greek, Roman, and Byzantine Studies (39).
- Bachrach, David S. (2006). "English Artillery 1189-1307: The Implications of Terminology". The English Historical Review. 121 (494): 1408–30. doi:10.1093/ehr/cel284. JSTOR 4493715.
- Fulton, Michael S. (2016a), The Diffusion of Artillery Terminology in the Early Thirteenth Century
- Fulton, Michael S. (2016), Artillery in and around the Latin East
- Fulton, Michael S. (August 13, 2018). Artillery in the Era of the Crusades: Siege Warfare and the Development of Trebuchet Technology. Brill. ISBN 978-90-04-37692-2.
- Graff, David A. (2016), The Eurasian Way of War Military Practice in Seventh-Century China and Byzantium, Routledge
- Gravett, Christopher (1990). Medieval Siege Warfare. Osprey Publishing.
- Hansen, Peter Vemming (April 1992). "Medieval Siege Engines Reconstructed: The Witch with Ropes for Hair". Military Illustrated (47): 15–20.
- Hansen, Peter Vemming (1992). "Experimental Reconstruction of the Medieval Trebuchet". Acta Archaeologica (63): 189–208. Archived from the original on 2007-04-03.
- Humphries, Paul D. (1985). "'Of Arms and Men': Siege and Battle Tactics in the Catalan Grand Chronicles (1208-1387)". The Journal of Military History. 49 (4): 173–178.
- Gareth, Williams (2013). "By Hook or by Crook: Siege Warfare in the Fourteenth Century". Medieval Warfare. 3 (1): 13–17. doi:10.2307/1987537. JSTOR 1987537.
- Marvin, Laurence W. (2001). "War in the South: A First Look at Siege Warfare in the Albigensian Crusade, 1209–1218". War in History. 8 (4): 373–95. JSTOR 26013906.
- Tarver, W. T. S. (1995). "The Traction Trebuchet: A Reconstruction of an Early Medieval Siege Engine". Technology and Culture. 36 (1): 136–67. doi:10.2307/3106344. JSTOR 3106344. S2CID 112822220.
- Jahsman, William E.; MTA Associates (2000). The Counterweighted Trebuchet – an Excellent Example of Applied Retromechanics.
- Jahsman, William E.; MTA Associates (2001). FATAnalysis (PDF). Archived (PDF) from the original on 2006-10-06.
- Janin, Hunt; Carlson, Ursula (10 January 2014). Mercenaries in Medieval and Renaissance Europe. Jefferson, North Carolina: McFarland. ISBN 978-1-4766-1207-2. OCLC 1045562559.
- Archbishop of Thessalonike, John I (1979). Miracula S. Demetrii, ed. P. Lemerle, Les plus anciens recueils des miracles de saint Demitrius et la penetration des slaves dans les Balkans. Centre National de la Recherche Scientifique.
- Liang, Jieming (2006). Chinese Siege Warfare: Mechanical Artillery & Siege Weapons of Antiquity – An Illustrated History.
- Needham, Joseph (1994), Science and Civilization in China Volume 5 Part 6, Cambridge University Press
- Needham, Joseph (2004). Science and Civilization in China. Cambridge University Press. p. 218.
- Needham, Joseph (1986), Science and Civilization in China: Volume 4, Part 2, Caves Books, Ltd.
- Noble, T. F. X., ed. (2009). Charlemagne and Louis the Pious: The Lives by Einhard, Notker, Ermoldus, Thegan and the Astronomer. Pennsylvania State University Press.
- Payne-Gallwey, Sir Ralph (1903). "LVIII The Trebuchet". The Crossbow With a Treatise on the Balista and Catapult of the Ancients and an Appendix on the Catapult, Balista and Turkish Bow (Reprint ed.). pp. 308–315.
- Peterson, Leif Inge Ree (2013), Siege Warfare and Military Organization in the Successor States, Brill
- Purton, Peter (2009), A History of the Early Medieval Siege c.450-1200, The Boydell Press
- Purton, Peter (2010), A History of the Late Medieval Siege 1200-1500, The Boydell Press
- Sayers, William (2023), "Chapter 3: The Counterweight Trebuchet, the History of Its Name in Medieval France and Britain, and the Terminology of Its Components in Villard de Honnecourt", The Worlds of Villard de Honnecourt: The Portfolio, Medieval Technology, and Gothic Monuments, Brill
- Saimre, Tanel (2007), Trebuchet – a gravity operated siege engine. A Study in Experimental Archaeology (PDF), archived (PDF) from the original on 2022-10-10
- Siano, Donald B. (November 16, 2013). Trebuchet Mechanics (PDF). Archived from the original on 2014-03-03.
- Saimre, Tanel (2006). "Trebuchet - A Gravity-Operated Siege Engine: Study in Experimental Archaeology". Estonian Journal of Archaeology. 10: 61–80. doi:10.3176/arch.2006.1.03. S2CID 160430733.
- Turnbull, Stephen (2001), Siege Weapons of the Far East (1) AD 612-1300, Osprey Publishing
- Al-Tarsusi (1947). Instruction of the masters on the means of deliverance from disasters in wars. Bodleian MS Hunt. 264. ed. Cahen, Claude, "Un traite d'armurerie compose pour Saladin". Bulletin d'etudes orientales 12 [1947–1948]:103–163.
- Zurawski, Bogdan (2021). "Christian and Islamic Nubia, 543–1820". Oxford Research Encyclopedia of African History. doi:10.1093/acrefore/9780190277734.013.407. ISBN 978-0-19-027773-4.
