= Bolesław (given name) =

Bolesław / Boleslav
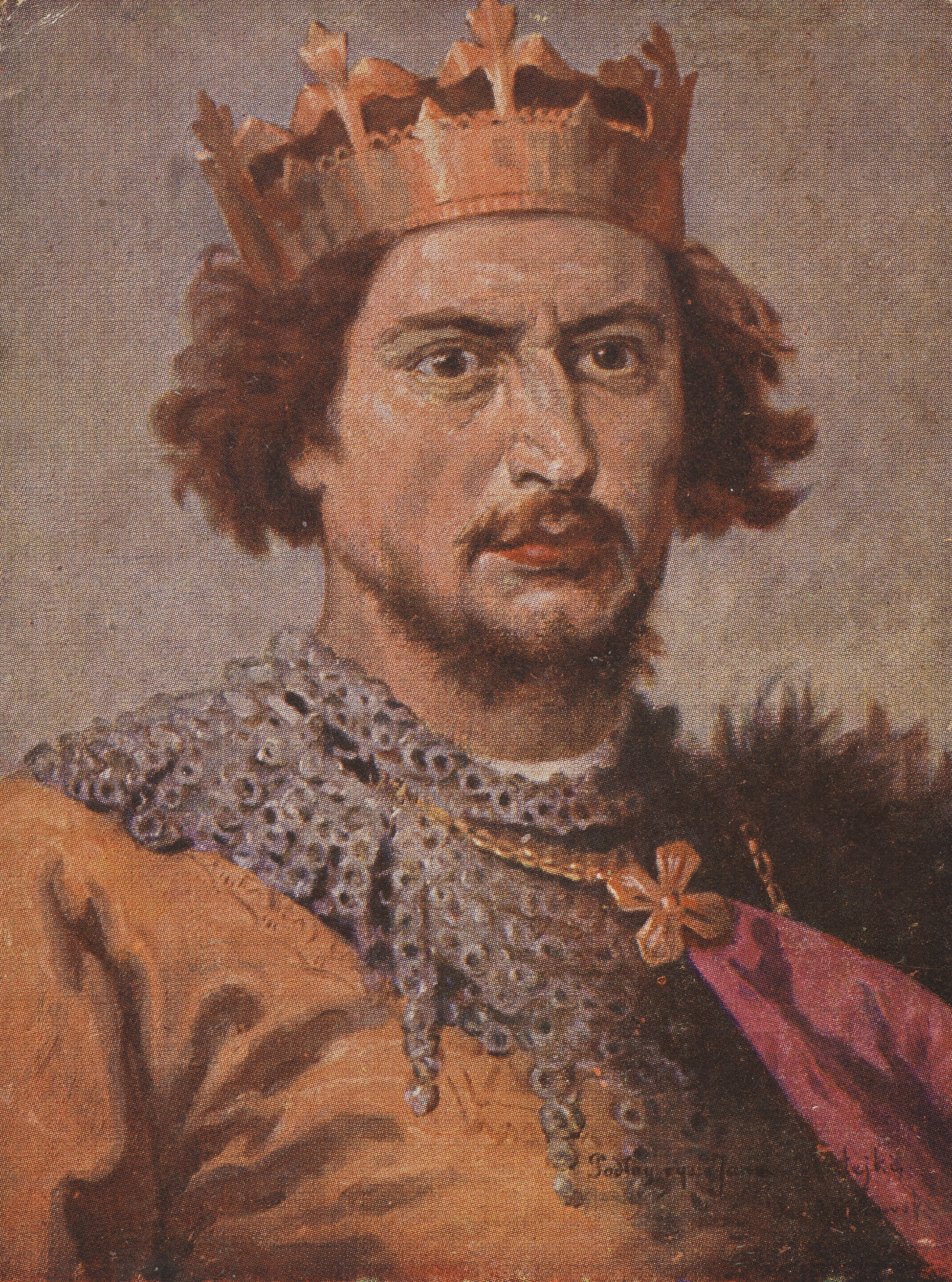
- Bolesław II of Poland
- Pronunciation: Czech: [ˈbolɛslaf] Polish: [bɔˈlɛswaf]
- Gender: male

Origin
- Origin: Slavic
- Meaning: bole ("large, more") + sława/slava ("glory, fame")

Other names
- Variant form: Bolesława/Boleslava (f)
- Nicknames: Bolek, Bolko, Bolo, Slava, Slavko, Sławek

Bolesław (Polish: [bɔˈlɛ.swaf]), Boleslaw, Boleslav or Boleslaus (in Latin), is a male given name of Slavic origin meaning great glory. Feminine forms of the name are Bolesława and Boleslava.

It was the favoured dynastic name in the Polish Piast dynasty and also, to a considerably lesser extent, among the Czech Přemyslids. The name was used by the Piasts after being borrowed from Přemyslids through inheritance in the female line: The mother of the first Polish monarch of that name, Boleslaus the Brave, was the Czech princess Doubravka of Bohemia, whose father Boleslaus I, Duke of Bohemia and brother Boleslaus II, Duke of Bohemia bore the name Boleslav. Rulers of the Silesian line of the Piast dynasty were often known by the shortened version of the name, Bolko. In total, 45 kings and dukes from the House of Piast bore the name.

== List of people with given name Bolesław, Boleslav or Boleslaus ==
=== Polish historical rulers from the House of Piast ===
- Bolesław I of Poland (c. 966–1025), known as 'the Brave' or 'the Valiant', Duke of Poland from 992 to 1025 (ending in 1025 as King of Poland)
- Bolesław II of Poland (1039–1081), known as 'the Bold', 'the Generous' or 'the Cruel', Duke of Poland 1058 to 1076 and King of Poland 1076 to 1079
- Bolesław III Wrymouth (1085–1138), Duke of Poland from 1102 to 1138
- Bolesław IV the Curly (1120–1173), High Duke of Poland from 1146 to 1173
- Bolesław the Pious (c. 1224–1279), Duke of Greater Poland 1239–1247
- Bolesław I of Masovia (1208–1248), Duke of Sandomierz, Sieradz (1233–1234), and Masovia (1229–1248)
- Bolesław II of Masovia (c. 1250–1313), Duke of Masovia
- Bolesław Jerzy of Mazovia (c. 1305/1310–1340), Duke of Masovia and Galicia-Volhynia
- Bolesław of Cieszyn (died 1356), (c. 1331/32–1356), Polish prince
- Bolesław I of Cieszyn (c. 1363–1431), Duke of Cieszyn
- Bolesław II of Cieszyn (c. 1425/28–1452), Duke of Cieszyn
- Bolesław I the Tall (1127–1201), Duke of Wrocław
- Bolesław II Rogatka (1220/5–1278), Duke of Silesia and portions of Poland
- Bolesław II of Niemodlin (1326/35–1368), Duke of Niemodlin
- Bolesław III the Generous (1291–1352), Duke of Legnica, Brzeg and Wrocław
- Bolesław III of Płock (c. 1325–1351), Duke of Płock
- Bolesław IV of Legnica (c. 1349–1394), Duke of Legnica
- Bolesław IV of Warsaw (1421–1454), Duke of Warsaw
- Bolesław V of Warsaw (1454–1488), Duke of Warsaw, Zakroczym, Nur, Płock, and Wizna
- Bolesław V the Chaste (1226–1279), Duke of Kraków, who rebuilt the city after its destruction in 1241
- Bolesław of Bytom (1330–1355), Duke of Koźle and Bytom
- Bolesław of Dobrzyń (1303/06–1327/29), Polish prince, Duke of Dobrzyń and Łęczyca
- Bolesław of Kuyavia (1159–1195), Duke of Kuyavia from c. 1186 to 1195
- Bolesław of Oleśnica (c. 1295–1321), Duke of Żagań and Ścinawa
- Bolesław of Toszek (1276/78–1328), Duke of Toszek
- Bolesław the Elder (1293–1365), Duke of Wielun, Niemodlin, who often goes by the name Bolko

=== Polish-Silesian rulers from the House of Piast known as Bolko ===
- Bolko I the Strict (1252/56–1301), Duke of Lwówek, Jawor, Świdnica and Ziębice/Münsterberg
- Bolko I of Opole (1258–1313), Duke of Opole, Niemodlin and Strzelce Opolskie
- Bolko II of Ziębice (1300–1341), Duke of Ziębice/Münsterberg
- Bolko II of Opole (1300–1356), Duke of Opole
- Bolko II the Small (1312–1368), Duke of Świdnica Jawor, Lwówek, Lusatia and Siewierz
- Bolko III of Strzelce (1337–1382), Duke of Opole and Strzelce
- Bolko III of Münsterberg (1348–1410), Duke of Ziębice/Münsterberg
- Bolko IV of Opole (1363/67–1437), Duke of Strzelce, Niemodlin and Opole
- Bolko V the Hussite (c. 1400–1460), Duke of Opole, Głogówek, Prudnik, Strzelce, Niemodlin and Olesno

=== Czech historical rulers ===
- Boleslaus I of Bohemia (915–972), known as 'the Cruel', ruling from 929 (or 935) to 972 (or 967)
- Boleslaus II of Bohemia (c. 920–999), known as 'the Pious', ruling from 972 to 999
- Boleslaus III of Bohemia (c. 965–1037), known as 'the Red' or 'the Blind', ruling from 999 to 1002

=== Other historical rulers ===
- Boleslaw of Sweden (died 1172/73), 12th-century Swedish king
- Bolesław the Forgotten (before 1016–1038/39), semi-legendary King of Poland
- Burislav, mythical Wendish or Polish king

=== Other people ===
==== Bolesław ====
- Bolesław Banaś (1912–1991), Polish fencer
- Bolesław Barbacki (1891–1941), Polish painter
- Boleslaw Barlog (1906–1999), German director
- Bolesław Biegas (1877–1954), Polish painter and sculptor
- Bolesław Bierut (1892–1956), former President of Poland
- Bolesław Błaszczyk (born 1964), Polish footballer
- Bolesław Borysiuk (born 1948), Polish politician
- Bolesław Chocha (1923–1987), Polish military commander, publicist, and military theorist
- Bolesław Cichecki (1905–1972), Polish footballer
- Bolesław Cybis (1895–1957), Polish painter, sculptor, and muralist
- Bolesław Czaiński (born 1949), Polish field hockey player
- Bolesław Jan Czedekowski (1885–1969), Polish artist
- Bolesław Dembiński (1833–1914), Polish composer and organist
- Bolesław Roman Dłuski (1826–1905), Polish-Lithuanian physician, painter and military officer
- Antoni Bolesław Dobrowolski (1872–1954), Polish geophysicist, meteorologist and explorer
- Bolesław Domański (1872–1939), Polish Catholic Priest
- Bolesław Drewek (1903–1972), Polish rower
- Bolesław Drobiński (1918–1995), Polish fighter pilot, flying ace of World War II
- Bolesław Drobner (1883–1968), Polish politician
- Bolesław Dubicki (1934–2004), Polish wrestler
- Bolesław Bronisław Duch (1896–1980), Polish army general and military official
- Bolesław Filipiak (1901–1978), Polish cardinal of the Roman Catholic Church
- Bolesław Fleszar (1933–2023), Polish chemist and politician
- Bolesław Formela (1903–1944), Polish army officer
- Grzegorz Bolesław Frąckowiak (1911–1943), Polish catholic friar and martyr
- Bolesław Gebert (1895–1986), Polish communist politician and diplomat
- Bolesław Gendera (1918–1997), Polish footballer
- Bolesław Michal Gładych (1918–2011), Polish fighter pilot, flying ace of World War II
- Boleslaw Goldman (born 1938), Polish-Israeli physician and professor
- Bolesław Gościewicz (1890–1973), Polish sports shooter
- Bolesław Habowski (1914–1979), Polish footballer
- Bolesław Januszowic (1385/86–1424), Polish prince
- Bolesław Kieniewicz (1907–1969), Polish general
- Bolesław Hieronim Kłopotowski (1848–1903), Roman Catholic archbishop
- Bolesław Kolasa (1920–2007), Polish ice hockey player
- Bolesław Kominek (1903–1974), Polish Roman Catholic archbishop and cardinal
- Bolesław Konorski (1892–1986), Polish engineer and electrotechnician
- Bolesław Kontrym (1898–1953), Polish Army officer and participant in the Warsaw Uprising
- Bolesław Kotula (1849–1898), Polish naturalist and teacher
- Bolesław Kwiatkowski (1942–2021), Polish basketball player
- Bolesław Leśmian (1877–1937), Polish poet and artist
- Bolesław Lewandowski (1935–2003), Polish footballer
- Bolesław Limanowski (1835–1935), Polish politician
- Bolesław Masłowski (1851–1928), Polish chemist
- Bolesław Matuszewski (1856–1943/44), Polish businessman, photographer and cameraman, pioneer of cinematography
- Bolesław Mołojec (1909–1942), Polish communist activist and politician
- Bolesław Napierała (1909–1976), Polish cyclist
- Bolesław Ocias (1929–2019), Polish conductor and composer
- Bolesław Orliński (1899–1992), Polish pilot
- Jan Bolesław Ożóg (1913–1991), Polish writer, poet and translator
- Bolesław Piasecki (1915–1979), Polish writer, politician and political theorist
- Bolesław Piecha (born 1954), Polish politician
- Bolesław Pietraszek, Polish farmer, Righteous among the Nations
- Bolesław Polnar (1952–2014), Polish visual artist
- Stefan Bolesław Poradowski (1902–1967), Polish composer
- Bolesław Proch (1952–2012), Polish motorcycle speedway rider
- Bolesław Prus (1847–1912), Polish journalist, novelist and leading figure in Polish literature and philosophy
- Bolesław Przybyszewski (1892–1937), Soviet teacher and musicologist
- Bolesław Pylak (1921–2019), Polish prelate
- Bolesław Płotnicki (1913–1988), Polish actor
- Bolesław Roja (1876–1940), Polish general and politician
- Bolesław Romanowski (1910–1968), Polish Navy submarine commander
- Bolesław Rusiecki (1824–1913), Polish-Lithuanian painter and art collector
- Peter Bolesław Schmeichel (born 1963), Danish footballer
- Bolesław Skarżyński (1901–1963), Polish biochemist
- Bolesław Smólski (1922–1979), Polish footballer
- Bolesław Strzelecki (1896–1941), Polish Roman Catholic priest
- Bolesław Surałło (1906–1939), Polish painter
- Bolesław Szabelski (1896–1979), Polish composer
- Bolesław Szadkowski (1945–2005), Polish footballer
- Bolesław Szymański (politician) (1877–1940), Polish politician, mayor of Białystok 1919–1928
- Bolesław Szymański (scientist) (born 1950), Polish computer scientist
- Bolesław Taborski (1927–2010), Polish poet, essayist and translator
- Bolesław Talago (1886–1960), Polish surveyor and publisher
- Bolesław Tejkowski (1933–2022), Polish sociologist, academic, and politician
- Bolesław Twardowski (1864–1944), Polish Roman Catholic prelate
- Bolesław Wallek-Walewski (1885–1944), Polish composer and conductor
- Bolesław Wieniawa-Długoszowski (1881–1942), Polish army general, politician and diplomat
- Bolesław Witczak (born 1966), Polish politician
- Bolesław Własnowolski (1916–1940), Polish fighter pilot, flying ace of World War II
- Bolesław Woytowicz (1899–1980), Polish pianist and composer
- Bolesław Wysłouch (1855–1937), Polish nobleman and socialist politician
- Boleslaw Wyslouch (professor), American physicist
- Bolesław Żytniak (1922–1999), Polish footballer
- Bill Sienkiewicz (born 1958), American comic book artist

==== Boleslaus ====
- Boleslaus (bishop of Vác) (died 1212/13), Hungarian prelate
- Boleslaus, son of Děpolt (c. 1190–1241), Czech nobleman
- Boleslaus Goral (1876–1960), Polish-American priest, professor, and newspaper editor
- Emmanuel Boleslaus Ledvina (1868–1952), American Roman Catholic prelate
- Boleslaus Joseph Monkiewicz (1898–1971), American politician

==== Boleslav ====
- Boleslav Jablonský (1813–1881), Czech poet and catholic priest
- Karel Boleslav Jirák (1891–1972), Czechoslovak composer and conductor
- Boleslav Kukel (1829–1869), Russian general and governor
- Boleslav Likhterman (1902–1967), Soviet medical researcher
- Boleslav Markevich (1822–1884), Russian writer and journalist
- Boleslav Mlodzeevskii, (1858–1923), Russian mathematician
- Boleslav Pachol (born 1948), Czech weightlifter
- Josef Boleslav Pecka (1849–1897), Czech journalist, poet and politician
- Boleslav Polívka (born 1949), Czech actor
- Stephen Boleslav Roman (1921–1988), Slovak-Canadian mining engineer
- Boleslav Skhirtladze (born 1987), Georgian long jumper
- Boleslav Yavorsky (1877–1942), Russian musicologist
- Boļeslavs Sloskāns (1893–1981), Latvian Roman Catholic bishop

== See also ==
- Bolesław (disambiguation)
- Mladá Boleslav, a city named after the Czech king
- Stará Boleslav, a town named after the Czech king
- Pulß, German surname derived from Bolesław
