= Pulse (disambiguation) =

A pulse, in physiology, is the throbbing of arteries resulting from heartbeat.

Pulse, The Pulse or Pulses may also refer to:

== Publications ==
- Pulse, a book by Robert Frenay
- The Pulse (comics), a Marvel Comics series
- Pulse (magazine), a medical professionals' magazine
- Pulse! (magazine), a music magazine
- Pulse (short story collection), a short story
- PULSE (webtoon), a lesbian webcomic collection by Julian Barnes
- The Pulse, the signal transmitted from cell phones that made people go crazy in Stephen King's novel Cell
- Pulse (Augustus), a character in the Marvel Comics universe

== Botany ==
- Pulse (legume), any agriculturally significant annual leguminous food crop, such as peas, beans, lentils, and chickpeas

== Electronics and physics ==
- Pulse (physics), a single disturbance through a transmission medium
- Pulse (signal processing), a brief change from a baseline value
  - Pulse dialing, of a telephone

== Film, television and games ==
=== Film ===
- Pulse (1988 film), a horror film starring Cliff De Young
- Pulse (1995 film), a video by the band Pink Floyd
- Pulse (2001 film) or Kairo, a Japanese horror film directed by Kiyoshi Kurosawa
- Octane (film), a 2002 thriller film released in the U.S. as Pulse
- Pulse: A Stomp Odyssey, a 2002 short documentary
- Pulse (2006 film), an American remake of the 2001 Japanese film
- Pulse, a 2010 British TV film directed by James Hawes
- Pulse (2017 film), an Australian film
- Pulse, a 2021 Ukrainian biographical sports film about the life of Oksana Boturchuk
- Pulse Films, a film company headquartered in London

=== Radio ===
- Pulse 1, an independent FM radio station in West Yorkshire, England
- Pulse 2, an independent AM radio station in West Yorkshire, England
- Pulse! Radio, a student-run radio station at the London School of Economics, England
- KVIT is a Mesa, Arizona-based, student-run radio station operated by the East Valley Institute of Technology that is branded The Pulse
- WKJO (FM), a radio station (102.3 FM) licensed to Smithfield, North Carolina, which was called Pulse 102 from 2010 to 2014
- WKXU (FM), a radio station (102.5 FM) licensed to Hillsborough, North Carolina, which was called Pulse FM from 2010 to 2022
- WPLW-FM, a radio station (96.9 FM) licensed to Goldsboro, North Carolina, which is called Pulse FM
- WTPL, a radio station (107.7 FM) licensed to Hillsboro, New Hampshire, which is called The Pulse of NH
  - WEMJ, a radio station (1490 AM) licensed to Laconia, New Hampshire, which simulcasts WTPL
  - WTSN (AM), a radio station (1270 AM) licensed to Dover, New Hampshire, which simulcasts WTPL
- 94.7 The Pulse, an Australian community radio station from Geelong, Victoria
- The Pulse (SiriusXM), a hot AC channel on Sirius XM Radio
  - The Pulse (Sirius), the original Sirius incarnation on Channel 9 until November 12, 2008
- Sounds of the Seasons: The Pulse, a Music Choice ambient music channel
- The Pulse (radio), a college basketball program that aired on ESPN Radio
- The Pulse, a health and science radio show on WHYY-FM
- RTÉ Pulse, an Irish radio station

=== Television ===
- Pulse (TV channel), a media stream based on video games and sports
- Pulse (American TV program), a video game news program aired on G4TV
- Pulse (Australian TV series), a 2017 drama lasting eight episodes
- The Pulse (TV programme), RTHK English-language current affairs programme
- Pulse (2025 TV series), a Netflix medical drama television series
- "Pulse" (Bugs), a 1995 television episode

=== Video games ===
- Pulse (video game), a 2011 music video game by Cipher Prime

== Music ==
- Pulse (music), a rhythmic succession of sounds

=== Groups ===
- Pulse (American band), an American dance/house project
- Pulse (UK band), a UK group, winners of the reality TV show Dance X
- Twist and Pulse, an English street dance band
- Pulse Percussion, a competitive indoor drumline that competes in WGI

=== Albums ===
- Pulse (Greg Phillinganes album), 1984
- Pulse (Megumi Hayashibara album), 1994
- Pulse (Pink Floyd album), 1995
- Pulse (Front 242 album), 2003
- Pulse (Toni Braxton album), 2010
- Pulse (Thomas Giles album), 2011
- Pulses (Karmin album), 2014
- Pulses (The Fast Feeling album), 2017

=== Songs ===
- "Pulse" (song), by Fluke
- "Pulse", a song by Erra from Augment
- "Pulse", a song by Loop from Fade Out
- "Pulse", a song by The Mad Capsule Markets from Osc-Dis
- "Pulse", a song by Mushroomhead from A Wonderful Life
- "Pulse", a song by Orchestral Manoeuvres in the Dark from History of Modern
- "Pulse", a song by The Psychedelic Furs from The Psychedelic Furs
- "Pulse", a song by Nebula from Heavy Psych
- "Pulse", a song by Skylar Grey from Don't Look Down

== Technology ==
- Pulse (ALM), a proprietary application lifecycle management technology
- Pulse (app), a news aggregator app for Android and the iPad, now owned by LinkedIn
- Pulse (interbank network), an electronic funds transfer network
- PULSE (P2PTV), a peer-to-peer software
- PULSE (Police Using Leading Systems Effectively), a computer system used by Irish police
- Pulse Smartpen, a ballpoint pen, computer, and audio recorder manufactured by Livescribe
- Novell Pulse, an enterprise collaboration software platform
- T-Mobile Pulse, an Android phone manufactured by Huawei

== Transportation ==
- Fiat Pulse, a subcompact crossover SUV
- GRTC Pulse, a bus rapid transit line in Richmond, Virginia
- Pace Pulse, a bus rapid transit system in the Chicago metropolitan area
- The Pulse, a three-wheeled electric vehicle prototype produced by Arcimoto
- Renault Pulse, an Indian version of the supermini car Nissan Micra
- UP Pulse, a German paraglider design
- Pulse Litestar, a motorbike with aircraft-esque cockpit and outrigger wheels

== Other uses ==
- Central Pulse, a New Zealand netball team based in Wellington
- Pulse (festival), an annual festival of the All India Institute of Medical Sciences in New Delhi, India
- The Pulse (shopping mall), a shopping arcade in Repulse Bay, Hong Kong
- PULSE (webtoon), a lesbian webcomic
- PULSE, a Ukrainian charity that supports the development of emergency and combat medicine, co-founded by Fedir Serdiuk
- PULSE, an interdisciplinary project at Boston College administered by the Lonergan Institute
- Pulse High School (Providing Urban Learners Success in Education), New York City, US
- Pulse nightclub, an Orlando, Florida gay bar, dance club, and nightclub where a mass shooting occurred in June 2016

== See also ==
- Journal-News Pulse, a defunct weekly broadsheet newspaper founded in Mason, Ohio, US
- Puls (disambiguation)
