= Puls =

Puls may refer to:

== Music ==
- Puls (album), by Swedish pop group Gyllene Tider
- Puls (band), a Danish music band specializing in club dance music

== Media ==
- Puls (content network), a German youth-oriented content network owned and operated by the Bayerischer Rundfunk (BR)
- TV Puls, a Polish television channel
- Puls Biznesu, a Polish-language daily newspaper
- Puls 4, an Austrian television channel

== Other uses ==
- Puls (surname)
- Puls (beer brand), a brand produced by Viru Brewery, Estonia
- Puls (company), a company provides on-demand tech services
- Puls (food), a typical farro-based food of the Roman legions
- Puls, Steinburg, a municipality in Schleswig-Holstein, Germany
- PULS, an Israeli multiple rocket launcher

== See also ==
- Pulse (disambiguation)
- Pulß
