= Boleslaus II =

Boleslaus II (Boleslav II, Boleslaw II, Bolesław II) may refer to:

- Boleslaus II, Duke of Bohemia (died 999)
- Bolesław II the Bold (c. 1041 or 1042–1081 or 1082) a.k.a. Boleslaw II the Generous, Duke of Poland 1058–1076 and King 1076–1079
- Bolesław II the Horned (c. 1220/5–1278) a.k.a. Bolesław II the Bald, Duke of Kraków in 1241, of Southern Greater Poland 1241–1247, and of all Silesia–Wrocław 1241–1248
- Bolesław II of Masovia (c. 1251–1313), a.k.a. Bolesław II of Plock
- Bolesław II, Duke of Cieszyn (c. 1425/28–1452)

== See also ==
- Boleslaus (disambiguation), other kings of this name
