= Military Geographical Institute Building =

Historic building in Warsaw, Poland

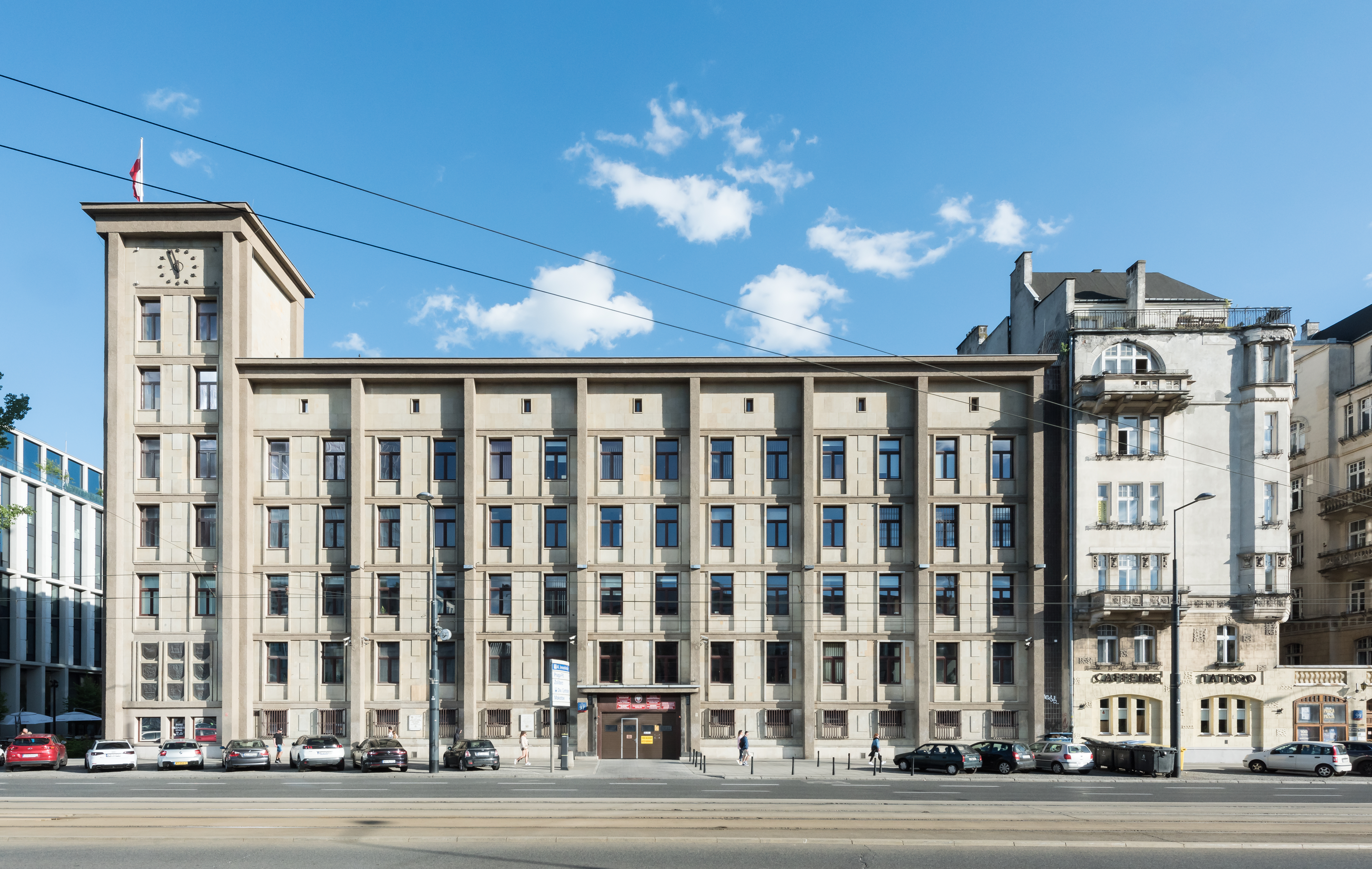
- The building as seen from Jerusalem Avenue.

General information
- Architectural style: Modernist; neoclassical
- Location: 97 Jerusalem Avenue, Ochota, Warsaw, Poland
- Coordinates: 52°13′35.33″N 20°59′53.33″E
- Construction started: 1933
- Completed: 1934

Technical details
- Floor count: 6 (building); 8 (clock tower)

Design and construction
- Architect: Antoni Dygat

The Military Geographical Institute Building (Polish: Gmach Wojskowego Instytutu Geograficznego) is a modernist and neoclassical building in Warsaw, Poland, located at 97 Jerusalem Avenue, in the neighbourhood of Filtry within the Ochota district. Opened in 1934, it has served as the headquarters of the Military Geographical Institute until 1949. The building is listed on the voivodeship heritage list.

== History ==
The building was designed by Antoni Dygat, and constructed between 1933 and 1934, as the headquarters of the Military Geographical Institute, which opearated until 1949. In 2000, commemorative plaque dedicated to the officers and employees of the institute who were killed during the Second World War, was installed on its façade. In 2007, the building was entered into the voivodeship heritage list.

== Architecture ==
The building has reinforced concrete structure, with 4 stories, and a 6-storey-tall clock tower, and bears elements of neoclassical and modern styles. It also has two inner courtyards. Its façade is lined with sandstone plates. It also features two cartouche depicting the sixteen coat of arms of the voivodeships of the Second Polish Republic. The originals were destroyed in the 1960s, and their replicas were installed in 2018.

Its main hall features the 1937 fresco by Boleslaw Cybis and Jan Zamoyski, titled Bolesław the Brave Drawing Borders of Poland on the Oder, as well as the 1938 sgraffito by Edward Manteuffel-Szoege, titled The Map of Poland.

== Gallery ==
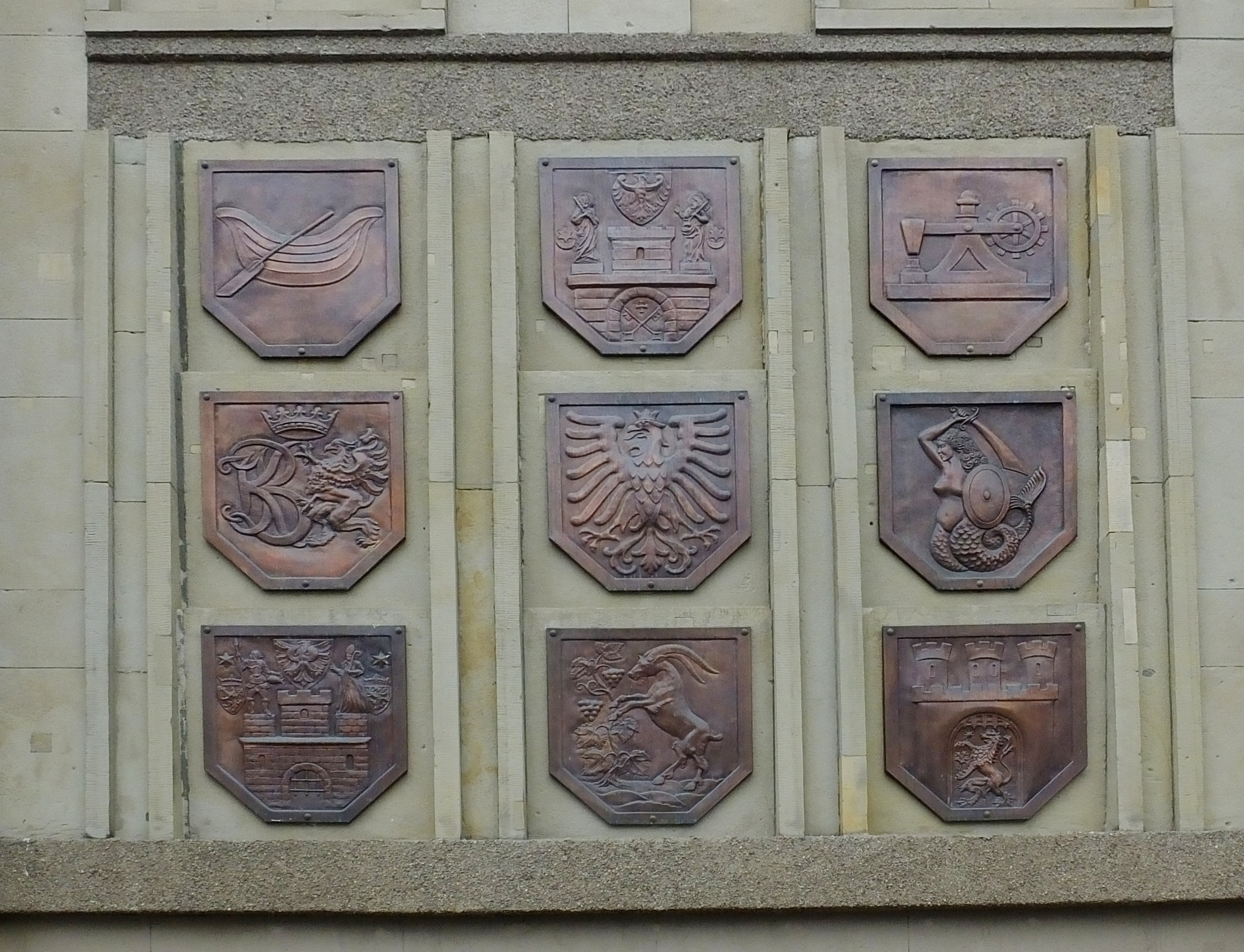
A cartouche with the voivodeship coat of arms on the north side of the building.

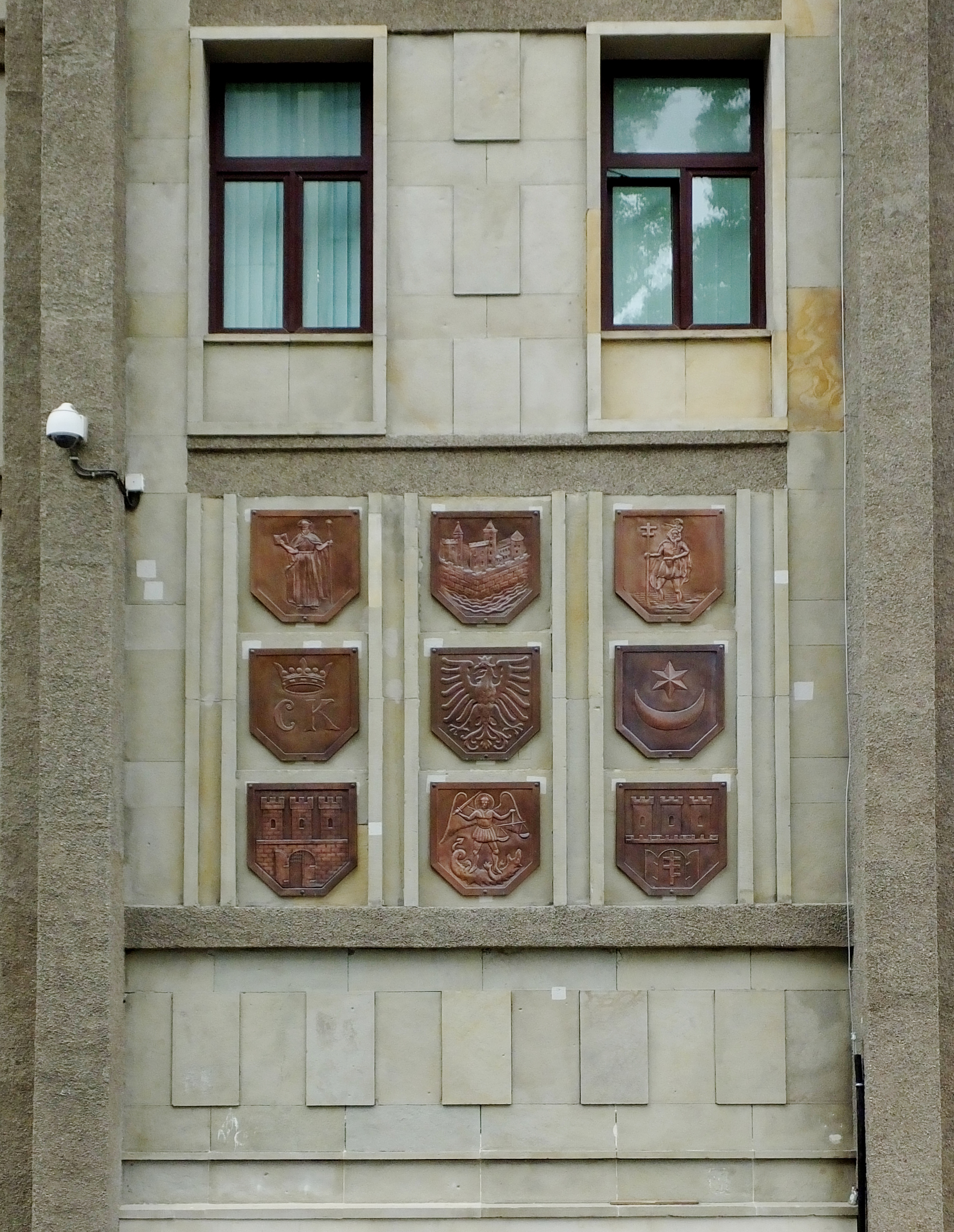
A cartouche with the voivodeship coat of arms on the east side of the building.

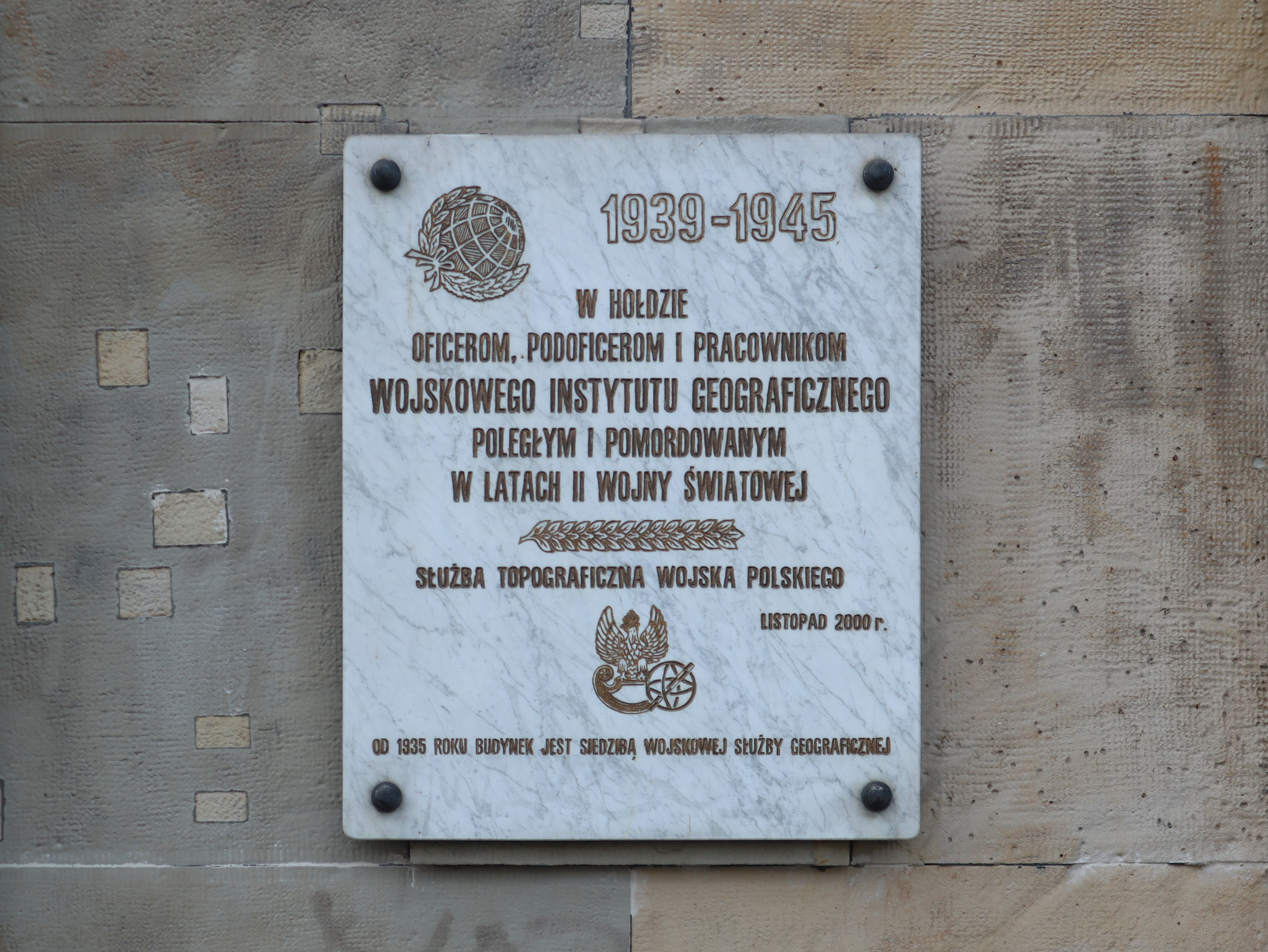
A commemorative plaque dedicated to the employees of the Military Geographical Institute killed during the Second World War.

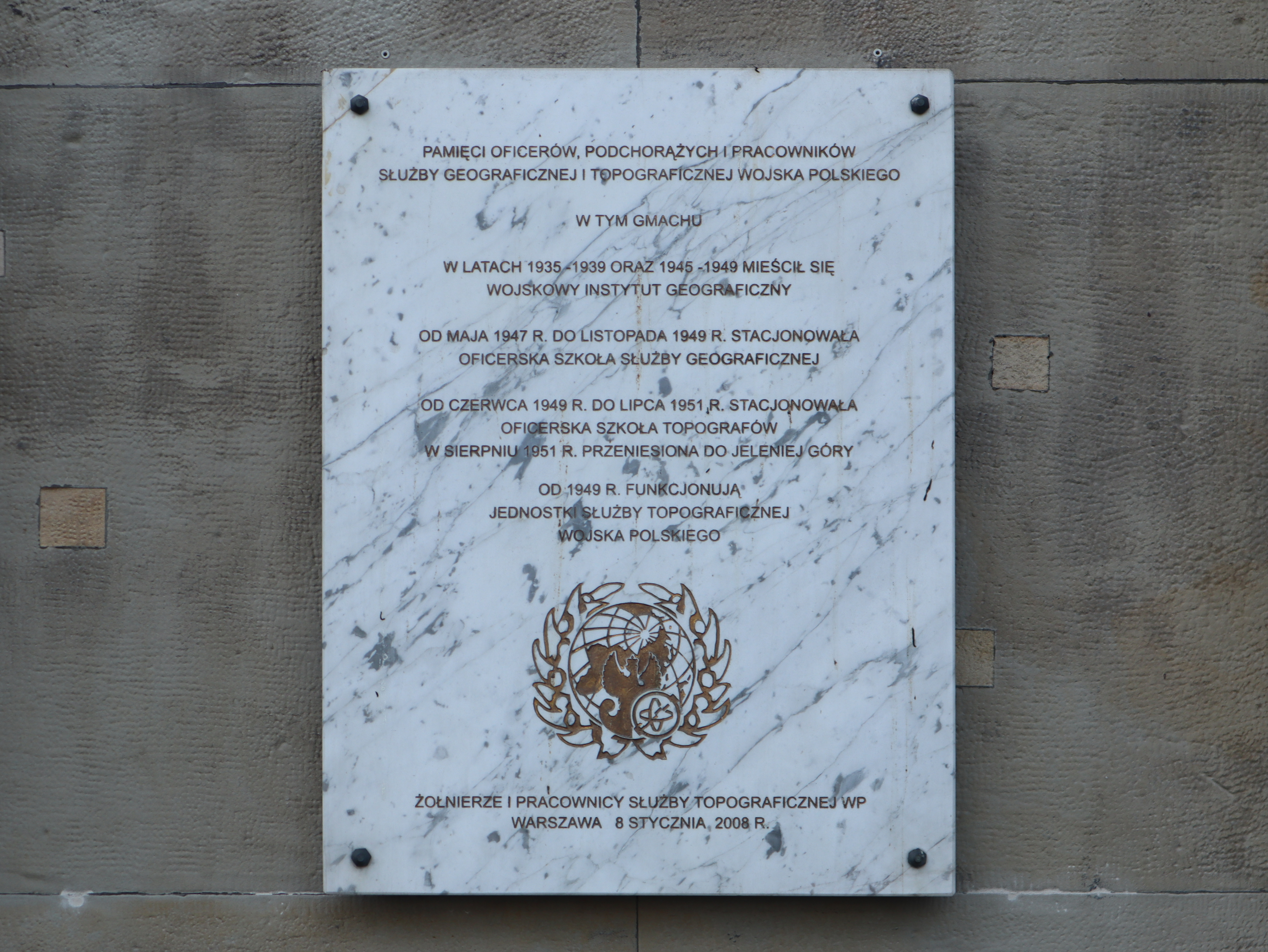
A commemorative plaque dedicated to the history of the building.
