= Puli =

Puli may refer to:

== Places ==
- Puli, Nantou, urban township in Nantou County, Taiwan
- Pulí, Cundinamarca, municipality and town in Colombia
- Puli Khumri, city in northern Afghanistan
- Puli, ancient name of Luzhi, town in Jiangsu, China
- Tashkurgan Town, Xinjiang, China, historically called Puli

== Films ==
- Puli (1985 film), 1985 Telugu film
- Puli (2010 film), 2010 Telugu film
  - Puli (soundtrack)
- Puli (2015 film), 2015 Tamil fantasy film

== Other uses ==
- Puli dog, breed of Hungarian herding and livestock guarding dog
- Puli (car), microcar made in Hungary
- The PuLi Hotel and Spa, in Shanghai, China
- Mr. Puli, pseudonym of Lu Guimeng, Tang dynasty poet
- HAT-P-12b, an exoplanet named Puli

== See also ==
- Pulis, a surname
