= Bolesław =

Bolesław or Boleslav may refer to:

== People ==
- Bolesław (given name) (also Boleslav or Boleslaus), including a list of people with this name

== Geography ==
- Bolesław, Dąbrowa County, Lesser Poland Voivodeship, Poland
- Bolesław, Olkusz County, Lesser Poland Voivodeship, Poland
- Bolesław, Silesian Voivodeship, Poland
- Brandýs nad Labem-Stará Boleslav, Czech Republic
- Mladá Boleslav, Czech Republic
- FK Mladá Boleslav, football club from Mladá Boleslav

== See also ==
- Pulß
- Václav
- Wenceslaus
