= Pulis =

Pulis is a surname. Notable people with the name include:

- Adrian Pulis (born 1979), Maltese football player
- Anthony Pulis (born 1984), English-born Welsh football player and coach
- Ray Pulis (born 1964), former football player
- Tony Pulis (born 1958), Welsh football manager and former player

== See also ==
- Puli, breed of dog
- Puls (disambiguation)
