= Military Geographical Institute =

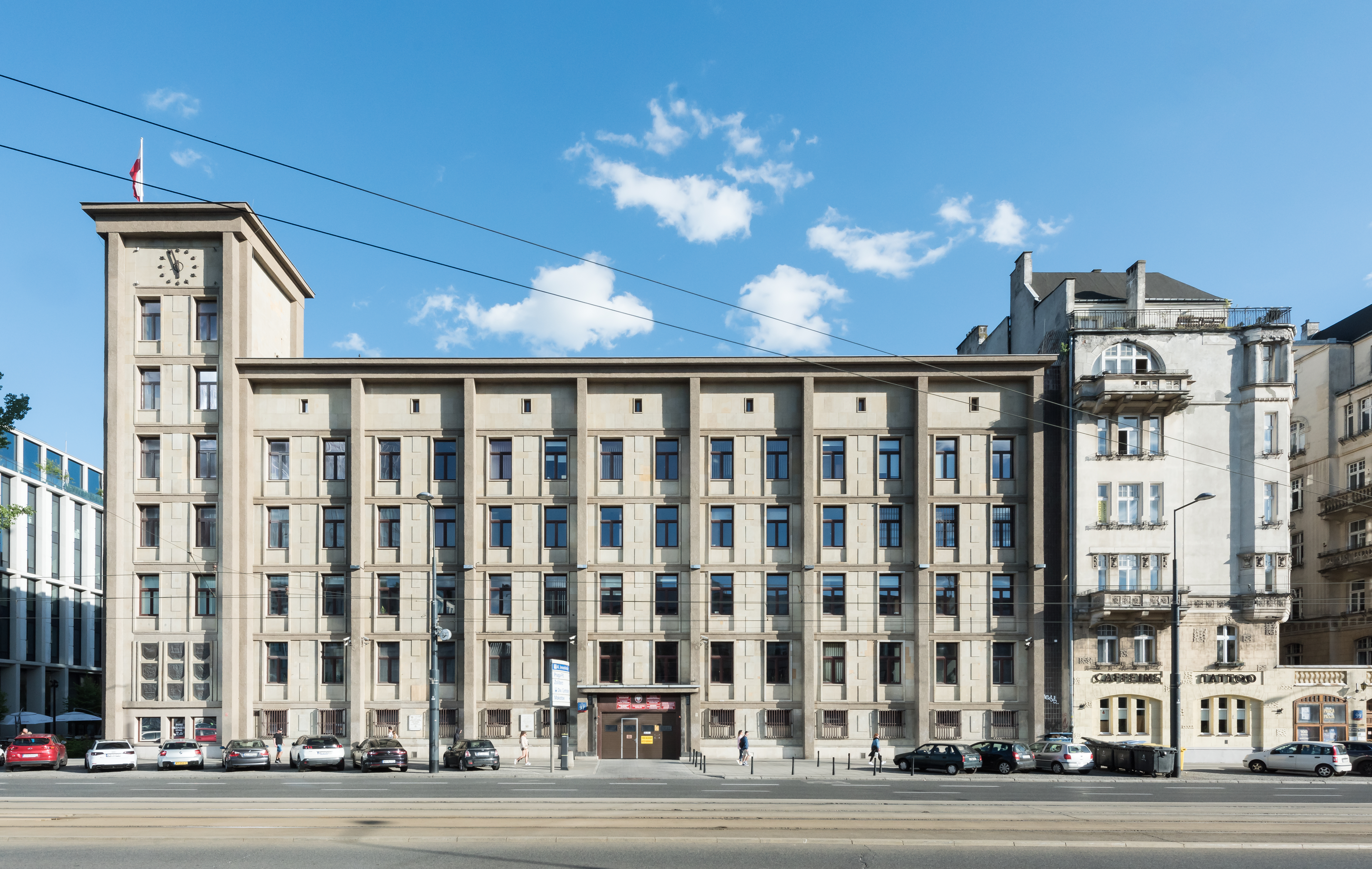
The headquarters building of the Military Geographical Institute in 2022.

The Military Geographical Institute (Polish: Wojskowy Instytut Geograficzny, WIG) was the cartographical institution of the Polish Armed Forces from 1919 until 1949. Colonel Józef Kreutzinger was the Head of the Institute from 1926.

== History of the institute ==
When Poland regained its independence in 1918 it faced a challenge of making a new set of maps for a new country. The invaders left behind nine triangulation systems with 8 reference points. The Wojskowy Instytut Geograficzny, originally called the Instytut Wojskowo-Geograficzny (the "Geographic-Military Institute") was set up in 1919 in Warsaw. Its first task was to form a coherent and updated system from the maps of Polish territory originally drawn by the partitioning powers (German, Russian and Austro-Hungarian Empires). The maps in various scales were the foundation of the 1:100,000 scale Polish maps.

By 1926 40% of the area of Poland was mapped. From 1927 onwards, WIG began to draw a uniform triangulation network and to print its own, original 1: 100,000 map, known as “type two”. These maps were two-coloured (black topographic elements, brown contour lines), some sheets contained two more colours added by overprinting. From 1929 onwards “type three”, i.e. two- and four-coloured maps were published. In 1931 a four-colour version became the standard type (known as “normal type” or referred to as the “tactical map of Poland”). By 1939 all 482 sheets for the area of pre-war Poland were published, together with around 280 additional sheets (wyłącznie do użytku służbowego or “for internal use only”) to cover the adjacent areas of neighbouring countries, i.e., USSR, Lithuania, Germany, Czechoslovakia and Romania.

== Other maps publications of the WIG ==
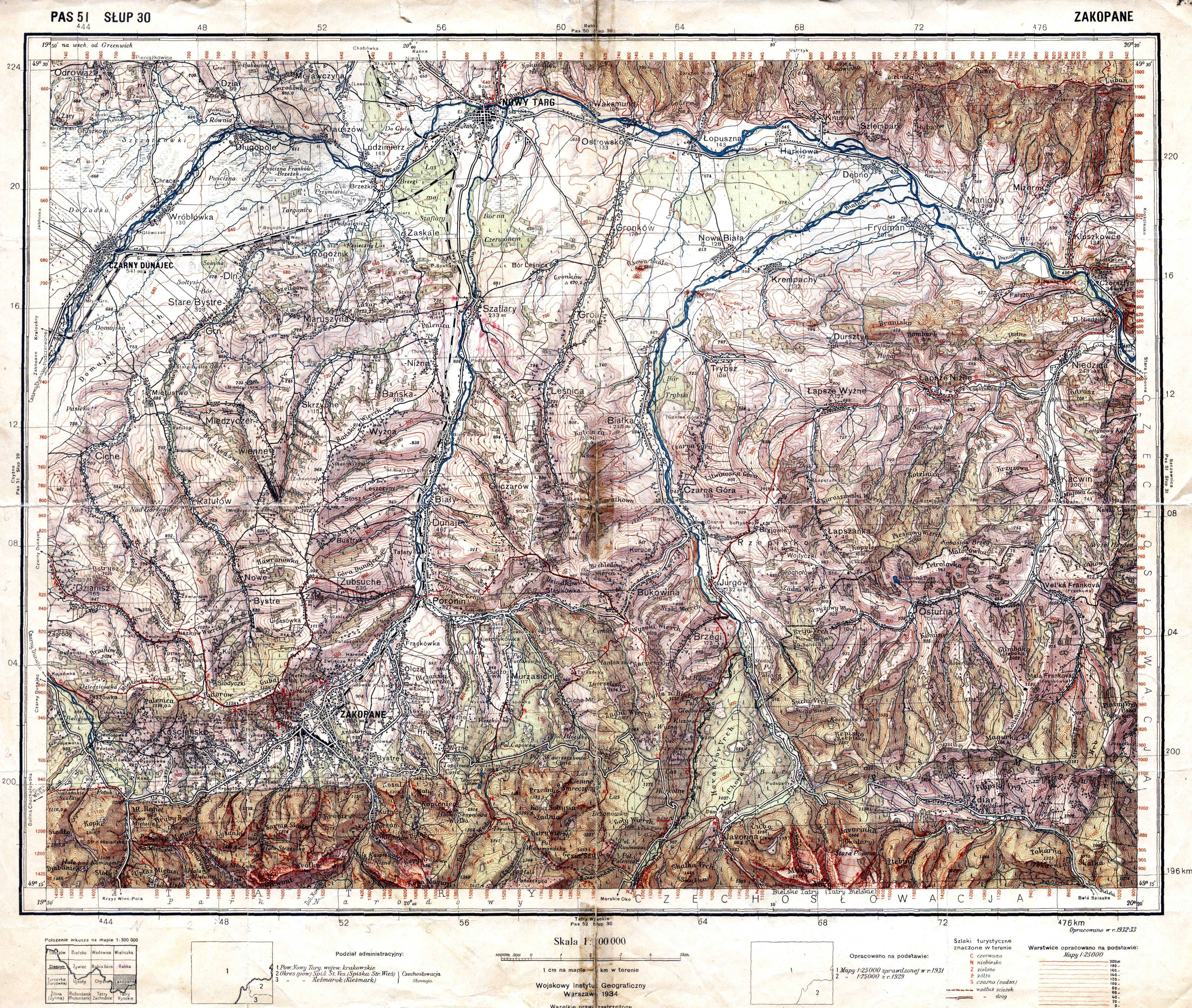
1:100,000 scale WIG map of Tatra mountains and Zakopane

- A detailed map of Poland (1:25,000). Up to the beginning of World War II 1,260 - 1600 (approx) of the planned 3915 sheets were published (32.2%). The exact number can not be verified due to lack of records.
- An operational map of Poland and neighbouring countries (1:300,000), 43 sheets (number unverified)
- A map of Poland and neighbouring countries (1:500,000),
- A map of Poland and neighbouring countries (1:750,000),
- An International World Map (1:1,000,000).

WIG also produced several detailed, multicolour maps of popular tourist destinations (e.g., the Tatra Mountains), for walkers and skiers, as well as 1:300,000 road map of Poland, city plans, etc.

Between 1927 and 1939 the Institute published, together with a section of Geograficzne Towarzystwo Wiedzy Wojskowej ("Geographic Society of Military Science"), the Wiadomości Służby Geograficznej (the Geographic Service News Quarterly). Around 50 volumes (up to 300 pages each) are known to have been published. They include valuable historical and geographical information on the land and peoples of pre-war Poland.

Polish topographic maps published by WIG were highly regarded in pre-war Europe and should have increased the combat effectiveness of the Polish armed forces. However, to help keep their wartime deployment locations secret most combat units were not issued the needed topographic maps in peacetime. Instead, the maps were to be delivered only after mobilization started, a few days before the outbreak of war. During the German invasion in September 1939 the wartime map distribution system broke down due to unexpectedly rapid German advance, and Polish units often lacked detailed topographic maps of the areas in which they were fighting.

After World War II broke out the Institute was evacuated, first to Lemberg (Lwów, Lviv) and via Romania to France, where it was re-activated. After the fall of France in 1940 WIG was evacuated again, to Great Britain, where it produced maps for the Polish army in the West, and copies of pre-war maps for the underground Polish resistance movement (a full set of 482 sheets). Quite separately, in 1941, British GSGS produced their own set of approx. 220 copies of WIG 1:100,000 maps (series number GSGS 4177), which covered (in colour) central Poland and (in black-and-white) an irregular section of a pre-WW2 eastern border of Poland with the Soviet Union. In the same manner, GSGS produced copies of all of the WIG 1:300,000 maps, which were by 1944 superseded by 1:250,000 maps of Central Europe (GSGS 4346).

Also, prior to the partition of Czechoslovakia, Czech army topographers copied some WIG 1:100 000. Although no written sources have been identified, several sheets of those maps are known which indicate a coverage of southern strip of Poland, up to the line of Katowice (and perhaps further north).

After the Soviet Union invaded Poland on 17 September 1939 several officers of the Institute were captured by the Red Army, some executed on the spot, others later murdered in the well-known Soviet Katyń massacre. Of those who survived, some joined the "Anders' Army" marching out of the Soviet Union to Iran in 1942, while others, later on, joined the Ludowe Wojsko Polskie (the "Polish People's Army" formed in the USSR in 1943). A few officers who returned to Warsaw by 1940, either voluntarily or under threat went back to work for the German-run Institute which became the biggest hub of German war-time map production in Nazi Germany (Kriegskarten und Vermessungsamt II). There are reports of some collaboration while, at the same time, a resistance cell was active in the institution, smuggling out maps to pass them on to the underground movement (the Armia Krajowa or "Home Army"). At the turn of 1943, probably due to the German counter-intelligence efforts, most of the members of the resistance inside the institution were arrested and executed.

From at least 1936 onwards, Germany incorporated WIG maps into their own Großblatt (1:100,000) mapping system, re-issuing WIG maps both in black and white and in colour, with some minor updates. 4-sheet reprints, mainly in colour, alongside 1:25,000 maps were also published. The latter were either copies of pre-1939 Polish 1:25,000 maps, or blown-up copies of 1:100,000 or (from 1944 onwards and in limited numbers) new sheets based on Polish cartographic materials captured in 1939, but with minor updates.

WIG maps were also a basis for the American AMS (Army Map Service) maps of Poland in the scale 1:100,000 produced from 1944 onwards, as well as for the British 1:250,000 and 1:500,000 air maps of Poland from the same period. After World War II, AMS also produced in 1952 a set of 1:25,000 maps of Poland (AMS 851 series), which was a melange of German (1:25,000, Messtischblatt), Polish (WIG 1:25,000) and Russian (1:42,000, 1:84,000) sources. Last noted use of WIG map is on an AMS 1:50,000 map of Czechoslovakia from Bieszczady area, dated mid-1955, which is based on a war-time German 1:50,000 map, which in turn, is a magnified WIG 1:100,000.

WIG was re-activated in Warsaw after the war (maps and machinery was returned from Scotland in 1945 - 1948). From 1945 onwards the Institute was active, copying both pre-war maps and producing new ones, particularly, from 1948 onwards, a new edition of 1:100,000 to cover the whole of Poland (known in Poland under the informal name of "Borowa Gora"), and was active until 1949. During the Stalinist purges of the 1940s and early 1950s, most of the senior staff were arrested and the Institute was disbanded. Its functions were taken over by the Oddział Topograficzny (IX) Sztabu Generalnego WP ("Topographic Section IX of the General Staff of the Polish Army") and Wojskowe Zakłady Kartograficzne (the "Military Cartographic Works").

Nowadays the maps by WIG are a valuable source of information not only for the historians, but also for tourists and people searching for their roots. In recent years mainly the maps of popular hiking areas have been reprinted by several Polish publishers. Currently there is an ongoing effort to collect and scan all the maps by WIG and make them available online.

== Bibliography (in Polish) ==
- Bogusław Krassowski, Polska kartografia wojskowa (1919–45), Warsaw 1974
- Bogusław Krassowski, Małgorzata Tomaszewska, Mapy topograficzne ziem polskich: 1971-1945. T.1 Polskie mapy topograficzne wydane w latach 1918-1945, Warsaw 1979
- oprac. Bogusław Krassowski, Jadwiga Madej, Dzieje polskiej kartografii wojskowej i myśli strategicznej: materiały z konferencji Białystok, 5 May & 6 May 1980 r., Warsaw 1982
- Eugeniusz Sobczyński, Historia Służby Geograficznej i Topograficznej Wojska Polskiego, Warsaw, 2000
