= Puls (surname) =

Puls is a German surname, derived from the Slavic forename Boleš, a short form of Bolesław, meaning "great glory."

Notable people with the surname include:

- Eric Puls (born 1971), American soccer player
- Hans-Joachim Puls, German rower
- Stan Puls, (1916–98), American double-bassist

== See also ==
- Pulß
