= Bolesław Skarżyński =

Polish biochemist

Bolesław Skarżyński (Polish pronunciation: [bɔˈlɛs.waf skarˈʐɨɲ.ski]; 31 March 1901 in Warsaw – 17 March 1963 in Kraków) was a renowned Polish biochemist.
