= Jan Bolesław Ożóg =

Polish writer, poet and translator

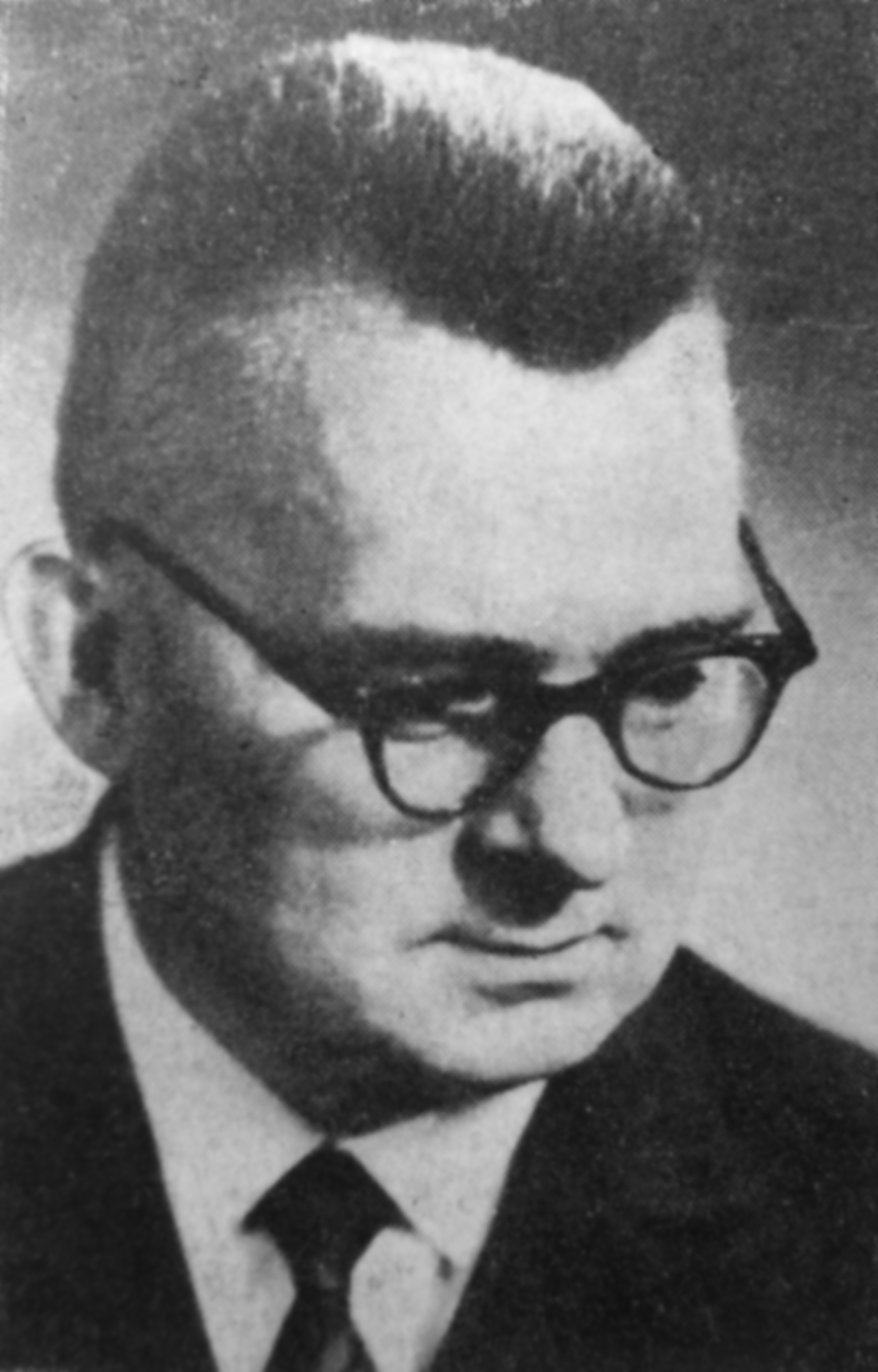
- Jan Bolesław Ożóg
- Born: March 1, 1913; Nienadówka
- Died: March 1, 1991 (aged 78); Kraków
- Resting place: Rakowicki Cemetery
- Education: Jagiellonian University
- Occupations: Writer, poet and translator
- Writing career
- Subject: Religious themes
- Notable work: Jemioła
- Movement: Autentyzm

Jan Bolesław Ożóg (1 March 1913 in Nienadówka – 1 March 1991 in Kraków) was a Polish writer, poet and translator. He was born into the family of a village church organist. His first university studies were in theology, but later he changed his mind and took a degree in Polish philology at the Jagiellonian University in Kraków. In spite of not finishing theological studies, Ożóg in his poetry was concerned with religious themes all his lifetime. Being a peasant, he was one of the main representatives of the Autentyzm poetic movement. Together with Stanisław Czernik he wrote its manifesto. He published his poems in the Okolica Poetów (The Neighbourhood of Poets) review. During World War II he organised secret schools and was soldier of the Home Army. After the war he was a teacher and worked in many places. He was one of the founders of the Barbarus poetic group. He is buried at Rakowicki Cemetery in Kraków. In his poetry Ożóg deals with themes of peasants' culture, Catholic religion, the conflict of faith and sexuality, sin and death. Sometimes he is regarded as a representative of Neo-Paganism as he often refers to Slavic myths. Oźóg's versification is notable for its frequent use of irregular amphibrachic metre.

== Bibliography ==
- Jan Bolesław Ożóg, Jemioła (Mistletoe) 1966.
