= Bolesław Czaiński =

Polish field hockey player

Personal information
- Nationality: Polish
- Born: 23 June 1949 (age 76) Gniezno, Poland

Sport
- Sport: Field hockey

Bolesław Czaiński (born 23 June 1949) is a Polish field hockey player. He competed in the men's tournament at the 1972 Summer Olympics.
