= Bolesław Żytniak =

Polish footballer

Personal information
- Full name: Bolesław Żytniak
- Date of birth: 29 October 1922
- Place of birth: Lviv, Poland
- Date of death: 23 May 1999 (aged 76)
- Place of death: Legnica, Poland
- Height: 1.76 m (5 ft 9 in)
- Position: Defender

Senior career*
Years	Team	Apps	(Gls)
1934–1939	CWKS Brody		
1939–1940	Spartak Brody		
1945–1950	Lechia Gdańsk	9	(0)
- Czarni Słupsk
1956–1958	Budowlane Gozdnica		
1958	Kolejarz Legnica		

Managerial career
- Gwardia Słupsk
- Czarni Słupsk
- Kabewiak Legnica
- 1969–1973: Dziewiarz Legnica
- 1973–1975: Hutnik Legnica
- Zawisza Lubin
- Miedź Legnica
- * Club domestic league appearances and goals

Bolesław Żytniak (29 October 1922 – 23 May 1999) was a Polish footballer who played as a defender.

== Biography ==
Born in Lviv, Żytniak started his career playing for teams in Brody, a town near the city of Lviv. He spent 5 years at the start of his career playing with CWKS Brody, playing a season with Spartak Brody before the leagues will have been cancelled as a result of the outbreak of World War Two. During his time playing in Brody, Żytniak worked as a builder for his profession, and graduated from a merchant high school. After the war many people from Lviv were moved to Gdańsk, with Żytniak being included in this population resettlement. Due to his move to Gdańsk, Żytniak started working at the Port Reconstruction Office, and joined the newly formed Lechia Gdańsk in 1945. He had to wait until the following year before making his debut for the club. His debut came on 21 September 1946, when he started against Ruch Chorzów in a 1–0 defeat. Żytniak continued to make sporadic appearances over the following years, never really becoming a starting player for the club. His career highlight came in 1949 when he played in the I liga, Poland's top division, featuring in Poland's first ever top division game, a 5–1 defeat against Cracovia. This turned out to be Żytniak's only I liga appearance of his career, as he failed to feature any more times for the club in the league that season. His last competitive appearance for the club came on 1 October 1950 in a win against Polonia Świdnica. This was Żytniak's last competitive appearance for the club as he was later banned from football by the WKKF, OZPN and the Budowlani sports club (who operated Lechia Gdańsk at the time) due to his "scandalous behaviour" in a friendly with Gedania Gdańsk on 1 November 1950.

The conditions of his ban were slowly eased, and Żytniak moved to Słupsk, joining Czarni. His move to Czarni was initially to play with the table tennis team, however after he was allowed to play again he started playing for the Czarni Słupsk football team. He later went on to play for Budowlane Gozdnica and Kolejarz Legnica. During his career Żytniak was said to be a strong and talented defender, having a relentless game. Comments also made by former teammates suggest that Żytniak could be quick to anger, such as instances of kicking a stand after giving away a penalty, and the incident that initially got him banned from football.

After his playing days Żytniak went into coaching, and later management. It is suggested that Gwardia Słupsk and Czarni Słupsk were his first roles as a trainer or in management, however it is most likely that these roles were held before he officially retired from playing football, and as they are not listed by one of the sources of clubs managed after his playing career. What is certain however is that Żytniak went on to manage Kabewiak Legnica, Dziewiarz Legnica, Hutnik Legnica, Zawisza Lubin and Miedź Legnica.
