= Boleslav Kukel =

Russian general, geologist and geographer (1829–1869)

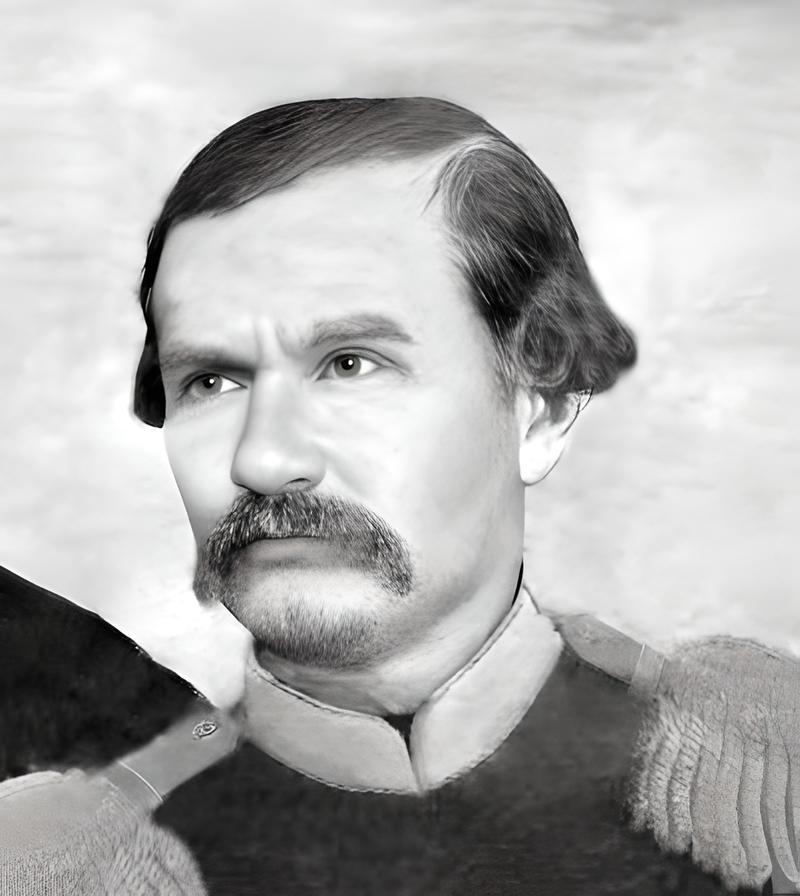

Boleslav Kazimirovich Kukel (Russian: Болеслав Казимирович Кукель; 1829–1869) was a Russian general, Governor of Transbaikalia, officially "the chief of General Staff of East Siberia," a geologist and geographer, and a Lithuanian strongly inspired with the modern ideas of the epoch, who maintained personal connections to various Russian radical political figures exiled to Siberia.

== History ==
=== As Officer ===
He was known to have kept personal copies of the works of Alexander Herzen, published in London, in his own officer's library.

=== With the Anarchists ===
Kukel's aide-de-camp was the famous Anarchist, a young Peter Kropotkin, with whom Kukel had shared an interest in geography. In this connection Kropotkin had applauded Kukel's efforts at reforming the prison system, while at the same time criticizing Kukel for not going far enough in the direction of progress, liberty, and human dignity. Kropotkin would eventually inspire Kukel with higher standards of living for Russian prisoners. Kukel would eventually be fondly remembered by the anarchist in his memoirs, Memoirs of a Revolutionist. Kropotkin would say that when Kukel, the reader of Alexander Herzen, was finally recalled from his post, he decided that it was time to become an explorer.

While on assignment in Siberia, Kukel introduced Alexander II to the poet, Mikhail Larionovitch Mikhailov, and he suggested to Peter Kropotkin that he should meet Pierre-Joseph Proudhon, the Mutualist-Anarchist from whom many more modern currents of Anarchism sprung.

Mikhail Bakunin's escape from Russian authority has been connected with the feud between Kukel and Governor-General Korsakov. Between his connections with Bakunin and with those of Kropotkin, Kukel is probably the most Anarchist-inspired of all Russian generals. There are some who suggest that his cooperation with anarchist Bakunin and poet Mikhail Larionovitch Mikhailov were responsible for his fate of being replaced.
