= Bolesław Cichecki =

Polish footballer

Personal information
- Date of birth: 23 April 1905
- Place of birth: Krepsztań, Russian Empire
- Date of death: 1 October 1972 (aged 67)
- Place of death: Warsaw, Poland
- Height: 1.68 m (5 ft 6 in)
- Position: Forward

Senior career*
| Years | Team | Apps | (Gls) |
| 1920–1927 | ŁKS Łódź | | |
| 1927–1928 | Gryf Toruń | | |
| 1928–1931 | Legia Warsaw | | |
| 1936 | Legia Warsaw | | |

International career
| 1926 | Poland | 1 | (0) |
- * Club domestic league appearances and goals

Bolesław Cichecki (23 April 1905 – 1 October 1972) was a Polish footballer who played as a forward.

He made one appearance for the Poland national team in 1926.
