= Bolesław Polnar =

Polish graphic artist, painter and teacher

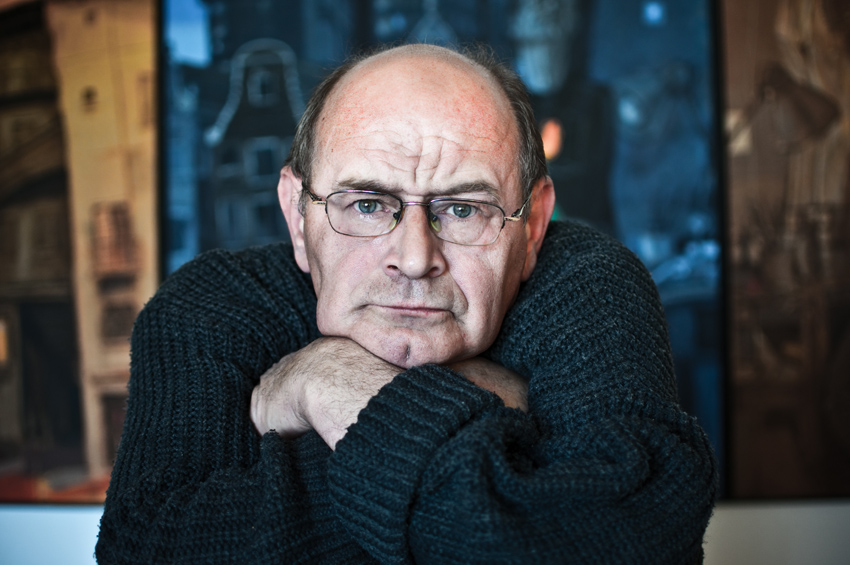
Bolesław Polnar

Bolesław Polnar (30 June 1952 – 10 February 2014) was a Polish visual artist, painter and teacher from Opole. He was considered one of the most influential designers of theatre posters in Poland. His works are held in many private collections.

== Works in collections of ==
- Opole
  - Muzeum śląska Opolskiego
  - J. Kochanowski Theater Gallery
- Kraków
  - Teatr Stary Museum
  - Poster Gallery
- S. Wyspiańskiego Theater Gallery (Katowice)
- Muzeum Plakatu Polskiego (Polish Poster Museum) (Wilanów)
- Private collections (France, Germany, England, United States)
- Pigasus – Polish Poster Gallery (Berlin)
