= Boleslav Likhterman =

Soviet scientist

- Born: Boleslav Vladimirovich Likhterman; October 14, 1902; Simferopol, Russian Empire
- Died: January 20, 1967 (aged 64); Yalta, Soviet Union
- Spouse: Sara Likhterman
- Children: 2

Boleslav Vladimirovich Likhterman (Russian: Болеслав Владимирович Лихтерман; October 14, 1902 – January 20, 1967) was a Soviet medical researcher. He is best remembered as a pioneer in the use of high frequency electrical currents in the treatment of physical ailments and as an editor of the academic journal Voprosi Kurortologii, Physiotherapii i Lechebnoi Physicheskoi Kultury (Problems of Balneology, Physiotherapy, and Therapeutic Physical Exercises).

== Biography ==
=== Early years ===
He was born of ethnic Jewish parents in Simferopol. His father, Vladimir (Vulf) Aaronovich Likhterman (Russian: Владимир (Вульф) Ааронович Лихтерман) was an attorney.

Likhterman attended gymnasium in Simferopol until his graduation, at which time he was awarded a gold medal for academic excellence. Following graduation, Likhterman enrolled in the Medical Department of Crimean (Tavrichesky) University, from which he graduated in 1925.

A 13-month stint in the military followed, with Likhterman serving in Sevastopol as part of the Red Fleet on the Black Sea (Russian: Черноморский флот).

In December 1926, Likhterman married Sara Yevseyevna Brusilovskaya, who later became a teacher of English.

=== Medical career ===
As 1926 came to a close, Likhterman received his first medical appointment, serving as head of a medical office in Belorezk, Bashkiria, part of the Bashkirian People's Commissariat for Health.

In June 1928, Likhterman moved to the Sevastopol city polyclinic, where he assumed a position as a neurologist and physiotherapist. He also worked as a consultant for the city's primary hospital. Likhterman remained in this position until the coming of World War II.

From 1929, Boleslav worked at the I.M. Sechenov State Research Institute of Physical Methods of Treatment, founded by Professor Alexander E. Scherbak in Sevastopol. There he was a member of the committee studying the use of short waves as a part of therapeutic practice. He was made head of the Clinical Department and Neurological Clinic at the Sechenov Institute in 1932, achieving the title of Docent (Associate Professor).

In 1939, Likhterman was awarded the “Excellence in Healthcare” prize by the USSR People's Commissariat of Health.

In September 1941, in light of the invasion of the Soviet Union by Nazi Germany, Likhterman and the rest of the Sechenov Institute was evacuated to Kazakhstan in Soviet Central Asia. There Likhterman worked as a chief of the Clinical Department in the hospital for the wounded and as a consultant at the Red Army Central Tuberculosis Sanatorium. His work with the ill took its toll and in 1942 Likhterman himself contracted pulmonary tuberculosis.

In July 1943, as the tide of the war began to turn, the Sechenov Institute was transferred west to Kislovodsk in Stavropol Krai, Russia. In the fall of 1944, the institute was moved back to the Crimea again, this time to the southern resort city of Yalta. For the next two decades, Likhterman would work as the head of the Neurological Clinic of the renamed I.M. Sechenov Institute of Physical Methods of Treatment and Climatotherapy in Yalta. He became a member of the editorial board of the academic journal “Voprosi Kurortologii, Physiotherapii i Lechebnoi Physicheskoi Kultury” (Problems of Balneology, Physiotherapy, and Therapeutic Physical Exercises) and editor of sections on physiotherapy and balneotherapy for the authoritative Great Soviet Encyclopedia as well as the Small Soviet Encyclopedia.

In 1948 upon the recommendation of the USSR Academy of Medical Sciences, Boleslav Likhterman was conferred the degree of the Doctor of Medical Sciences for his academic publications to date without a formal defense of a dissertation. He was granted the academic rank of the Professor in Nervous Diseases.

In 1952 for his outstanding service in the field of medical science, Likhterman was awarded the Order of the Red Banner of Labour by the Presidium of the Supreme Soviet.

In 1965, Likhterman was elected an honorary member of the All-Union Society of Physiotherapists and Balneologists.

=== Death and legacy ===
In 1966, Likhterman became ill with leukemia, dying of the disease on 20 January 1967 at Yalta.

Likhterman's remains were interred at the Yalta City Cemetery.

== Works ==
Likhterman was the author of 4 monographs on medical topics:

- О терапевтичском применении коротких волн (On the Therapeutic Use of Short Waves). With M.A. Borodina, V.M. Linchenko, and M.M. Orlov. Sevastopol: Sechenov Institute, 1936. This book was in fact the first fundamental guide on the use of short waves in medical diathermy and received very positive reviews in several academic journals.
- Лечение больных неврастенией в санаторных условиях Южного берега Крыма (Краткие методические указания) (Treatment of Patients with Neurasthenia in Sanatorium Conditions of the Southern Coast of the Crimea: Brief Guidelines). With B.F. Zimovskii. Simferopol: Krymizdat, 1955.
- Лечение больных неврастенией в санаторных условиях (Treatment of Patients with Neurasthenia in Sanatorium Conditions). With B.F. Zimovskii. Moscow: Medgiz, 1958.
- Лечение начального церебрального атеросклероза в санаторных условиях. (Treatment of Initial Cerebral Atherosclerosis in Sanatorium Conditions). Posthumous publication, with V.A. Ezhova, E.S. Volkov, and L.A. Kunitsina. Moscow: Meditsina, 1969.

Likhterman also wrote over 100 other scientific works on the role of the nervous system, with an emphasis on matters relating to balneotherapy and physiotherapy in the treatment and prevention of nervous and endocrine disorders. Another important topic of interest for Likhterman was the effects of high and ultrahigh frequency currents on healthy and diseased organisms, research which resulted in the development of various methods for the direct and indirect applications of such electrical energy for medical treatment. In particular, he developed a calcium collar electrode method and studied reflex effects of electrophoresis. He also studied the effect of energy treatment upon the brain, including the use of such therapies in conjunction with spa treatment, for treatment of neurasthenic syndromes, trauma and other disorders.
