= Bolesław Jan Czedekowski =

Polish artist

- Born: 22 February 1889; Wojniłów
- Died: 8 July 1969 (aged 80); Vienna

Bolesław Jan Czedekowski (22 February 1885 – 8 July 1969) was a Polish artist, who spent the vast majority of his life living abroad. Maintaining studios in Paris and Vienna, Czedekowski would spend a long career portraying high society on both sides of the Atlantic.

== Life ==
He was born on 22 February 1885, in Wojniłów, a town in Galicia, then part of the Austro-Hungarian Empire. He studied at the Academy of Fine Arts in Vienna, under Kazimierz Pochwalski and Heinrich von Angeli. During his time in the Austrian capital, he was bestowed with various prizes for academic merit, winning the prestigious 'Füger Medal' in his second year. He would graduate in 1907, but would remain a further four years at the academy. In 1913, he married Eugenie Nell, who gave birth to their first daughter, Helene, in 1914. A year later he would join the army as a soldier, only to become a military artist shortly after. He painted the Emperor Charles I in 1917 and exhibited at the War Exhibition of Austrian Painters and Sculptors in 1920.

The period after the First World War, saw Czedekowski gain prominence as a portrait painter. In 1920, he and his family would move to the US, where a short but successful spell, announced himself to fashionable society on that side of the Atlantic. Returning to Europe a few years later, he would continue portraying high society from his studios in Paris and Vienna. In 1923, he visited an independent Poland for the first time.

Towards the end of the 1920s Czedekowski's visits to Poland became increasingly frequent, by 1930 he was commissioned to paint the President Ignacy Moscicki. The portrait was well received and would encourage further commissions from the Polish elite: aristocrats, politicians, industrialists and clergymen all proved willing patrons for Czedekowski's paintbrush. Though constantly on the move, Czedekowski resided in Paris from 1923 to 1938; his rising reputation in that city, resulted in him being made a knight of the Légion d'honneur in 1934.

In Warsaw at the outbreak of the Second World War, Czedekowski fled to Vienna, where he observed the occupation of Poland from afar. He was stirred profoundly by the horrors of War and produced a series of paintings entitled "The War in Poland." His portrait of General George S. Patton Jr., painted at the end of the War, now hangs in the Smithsonian National Portrait Gallery in Washington D.C.

Czedekowski emigrated to the US in 1946, experiencing some of his most successful years. He would exhibit frequently across numerous states, becoming an American Citizen in 1952. After the sudden death of his wife in 1953, he returned to Europe, married Hertha Aujezedecky and lived out the remainder of his days in Vienna. Continuing to visit his homeland, now behind the Iron Curtain, he exhibited in Cracow in 1964 and received the 'Order of Polonia Restituta' at the Palace of Culture in Warsaw. Though overwhelmingly a painter of portraits, he painted a selection of landscapes whilst holidaying in Salzburg in his final years. He exhibited for a final time with the International Artist's Club at the Palais Palffy in Vienna at the beginning of 1965.

Bolesław Jan Czedekowski died in Vienna on 8 July 1969. He was buried next to his first wife at their holiday home in Lofer, Salzburg.

== Legacy ==
In 2002, his widow, Hertha, donated 11 oil paintings to the museum at Castle Łańcut. The museum later received two more paintings, as well as paperwork, sketches and photographs relating to the artist's life. The castle hopes to open a permanent exhibition, dedicated to Bolesław Jan Czedekowski.

== Bibliography ==
- Boleslaw Jan Czedekowski: The Artist and His Workby Karl Strobl, published by Verlag Kunst ins Volk, 1959
- Czedekowski Bogdan Jan, portrait of Otto Hartmann, 1913 ( pol. ) . In: Description of the work – H. Muszyńska-Hoffmannowa, A. Okońska, At six thousand miles. About the life and painting of Boleslaw Czedkowski, p. 16 [on-line]. Portal Artinfo.pl. [Access 2012-06-27].
- Bolesław Jan Czedekowski (1885–1969). Restore the memory of Czedekowski ( pol. ) . In: Antiques; Biography according to Pressmedia.com.pl [on-line]. www.pcgniezno.nazwa.pl. [Access 2012-06-27].
- H. Muszyńska-Hoffmannowa, A. Okońska, At six thousand miles. About the life and painting of Bolesław Czedekowski, Łódź 1978, p. 206.
- A. Rohrhofer: Boleslaw Jan Czedekowski – Liebe zu Lofer ( German ) . In Dorf Zeitung; Information on the opening of the exhibition [on-line]. dorfzeitung.com. [Access 2012-06-27].
