= Boleslaw Goldman =

Israeli physician

- בולסלב גולדמן
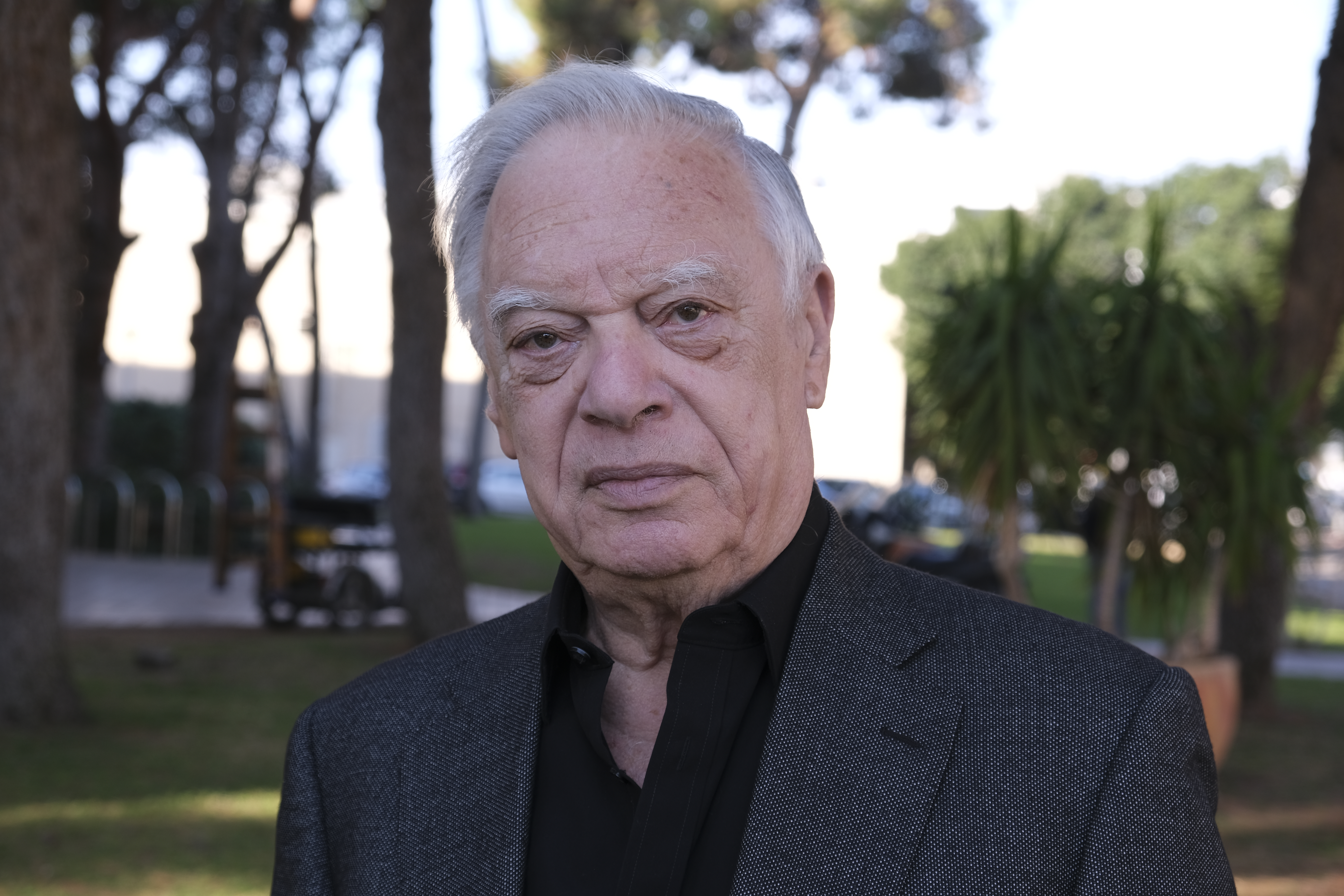
- Boleslaw Goldman
- Born: 1938 (age 87–88)
- Citizenship: Israeli
- Education: Hebrew University of Jerusalem

Boleslaw "Bolek" Goldman (Hebrew: בולסלב גולדמן; born 29 September 1938) is an Emeritus professor in the Sackler Faculty of Medicine in Tel Aviv University. He was born in Pulawy, Poland.

Goldman was the personal physician of the Prime Ministers of Israel David Ben-Gurion, Yitzhak Rabin and Ariel Sharon as well as Moshe Dayan and many others.

Goldman served for 14 years as the Director of the Sheba Medical Center. From 2009 to 2022, he served as chairman of the board of directors of the Gertner Institute for Epidemiology and Health Policy Research. From 2010–2016, he served as President of the Center for Academic Studies. From 1974–2004, Goldman was the director of the Institute of Human Genetics at the Chaim Sheba Medical Center.

Goldman founded the Supreme Helsinki Committee for Medical Experiments in Humans (Genetic Research) and served as its chairman from 1997 to 2010 on behalf of Ministry of Health.

In 2002, he received the David Ben-Gurion Award for Lifetime Achievement.

== Clinical experience ==
From 1968–1973, Goldman worked in Tel Hashomer Hospital, and in 1973, he was certified as a specialist in internal medicine. In 1987, he was certified as a medical management specialist, and in 1988, he was certified as a medical genetics specialist. From 1974 to 2004, he was the director of the Human Genetic Institute at Sheba Medical Center.

== Management ==
=== Public activity ===
In 1985, he was appointed chairman of the board and served in that capacity for three years.

Goldman founded the Supreme Helsinki Committee for Medical Experiments in Humans (Genetic Research) and was its first chair between the years 1997–2010.
