= T-Mobile Pulse =

Android phone manufactured by Huawei

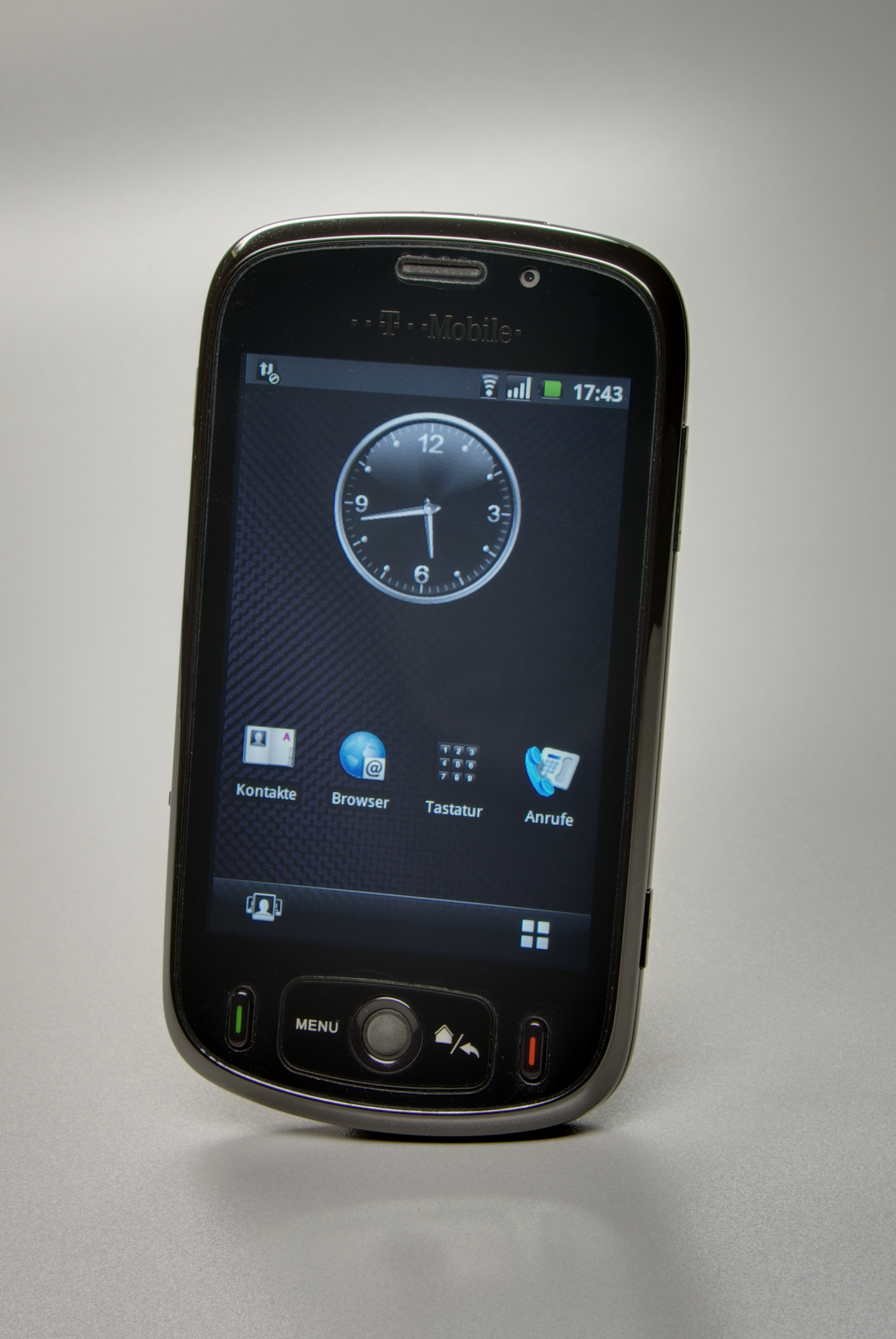
- Manufacturer: Huawei
- Type: Touchscreen smartphone
- Released: October 2009
- Operating system: Android, officially 1.5, can be upgraded to custom 2.2 ROMS.
- CPU: 768 MHz ARMv6-capable processor, Underclocked to 528 MHz
- Memory: 192 MB DDR SDRAM (Some models have 256 MB)
- Storage: Flash memory: [256] MB microSD slot: supports up to 16 GB
- Display: 320 x 480 px, 3.5 in (89 mm), HVGA, transflective TFT
- Input: Capacitive touchscreen display, on-screen QWERTY keyboard, volume controls, 3-axis accelerometer, 4 front-facing physical buttons
- Camera: 3.2 megapixel CMOS Sensor with auto focus (Rear-Facing Camera)
- Connectivity: WCDMA (3G) or GSM (2G) telephony network, Wi-Fi (802.11b/g), Bluetooth 2.0+EDR, USB Micro-B, A-GPS
- Power: 4.2 V 1150 mAh (4.3 Wh); Internal rechargeable removable lithium-ion battery
- Dimensions: 116 mm (4.6 in) (h); 62.5 mm (2.46 in) (w); 13.6 mm (0.54 in) (d)
- Weight: 135 g (4.8 oz)

The T-Mobile Pulse (Huawei U8220)(sold as the CHT8000 in Taiwan) is an Android-powered phone manufactured by Huawei and rebranded by T-Mobile. It is available in many markets including the UK and The Netherlands. Compared to many Android phones released at the time it was relatively low cost - originally selling for £185 in the UK, the Pulse achieved a minimum price of £19.99 + £10 top up on PAYG before being discontinued in April 2011. This made it one of the cheapest Android powered smartphones available at the time. The Pulse was also marketed as being the first Pay As You Go phone running the Android OS.

== Technical specifications ==
- Operating system Android, officially 1.5, can be upgraded to 2.2 via Custom ROMS
- Power 4.2 V 1150 mAh (4.3 Wh) Internal rechargeable removable lithium-ion battery
- CPU 768 MHz ARMv6-capable processor, Underclocked to 528 MHz
- Storage capacity Flash memory: 256MB with microSD slot supporting up to 16 GB
- Memory 192 MB DDR SDRAM (Some models have 256 MB)
- Display 320 x 480 px, 3.5 in (89 mm), HVGA, transflective TFT
- Input "Capacitive" touchscreen display without multi-touch feature, on-screen QWERTY keyboard, volume controls, 3-axis accelerometer, 4 front-facing physical buttons
- Camera 3.2 megapixel CMOS Sensor with auto focus (Rear-Facing Camera).
- Sensors A-GPS, 3-axis Accelerometer, Magnetometer (Compass), Battery Temperature Sensor
- Connectivity WCDMA (3G) or GSM (2G) telephony network, Wi-Fi (802.11b/g), Bluetooth 2.0+EDR, Micro USB, A-GPS
- Dimensions 116 mm (4.6 in) (h); 62.5 mm (2.46 in) (w); 13.6 mm (0.54 in) (d)
- Weight 135 g (4.8 oz)

== Firmware / ROMs ==
The Pulse was originally released with Android 1.5 heavily customized and branded by T-Mobile. It came with its own Home screen app, as well as various non-stock applications, including Documents To Go and RoadSync from DataViz.

=== Official firmware ===
Official firmware from the manufacturer, have been independently released by

- T-Mobile Hungary
- T-Mobile Sweden
- T-Mobile UK

As of June 2010, T-Mobile has provided some firmware releases for the Pulse:

- November 2009 Open Source Code released
- November 2009 Pulse firmware download
- December 2009 Increased stability; Improved audio
- May 2010 2.1 available in Hungary as an update
- August 2010 2.1 available in the UK as an update (T-Mobile has since removed this update from their site for further bug testing due to a SMS issue.)
- September 2010 2.1 Source Code released
- February 2011 2.1 available in the UK as an update (...B836... compared to ...B826... in Aug 2010, including the SMS fix)

=== Unofficial firmware ===
It is possible to root the Pulse, using software developed by the Android community. A custom recovery image is also installable.

Several custom ROMs have been created adding various features, including EXT2/3/4 file system support and Busybox pre-installation. The firmware from the Huawei u8230 has been ported to the Pulse to remove the T-Mobile branding, as well as other changes.

On 12 May, 2.1 was released on the Modaco Forums.

On 8 October, Tom G from the Modaco Forums ported a 2.2 beta of CyanogenMod 6. Latest available version is CM6.1RC2 0.40 Beta.

The highest supported CyanogenMod version is 7; it is based on Android 2.3.7.

== See also ==
- List of Android devices
