= PULSE (webtoon) =

Thai webtoon

- English cover for Volume 1
- Author: Ratana Satis
- Website: Lezhin Comics
- Current status/schedule: Complete
- Launch date: May 2016
- Publishers: Lezhin Comics; Seven Seas Entertainment
- Genre(s): Drama, Romance, Girls' love

PULSE is a drama romance webtoon created by Thai artist Ratana Satis. The series follows the relationship between a renowned heart surgeon, Mel, and Lynn, a cardiac patient who refuses to get a heart transplant. It began publishing weekly on Lezhin Comics between May 2016 and November 2017 after winning Lezhin Comics' second World Comic Contest.

== Plot ==
Mel, a well-known heart surgeon, enjoys life to the fullest and views sex more as a tool for delight than as a sign of affection. However once she meets Lynn, a cardiac patient who refuses to get a heart transplant, the way she views love and life is completely altered.

== Publication ==
Written and illustrated by Ratana Satis, PULSE was published weekly on Lezhin Comics from May 2016 to November 2017. It was one of the series to win Lezhin Comics' second World Comic Contest.

The series was first collected into seven self-published paperback volumes between 2016 and 2020, before Seven Seas Entertainment licensed the series in North America in 2022.

No.	Release date	ISBN
1	August 30, 2022	978-1-63858-564-0
2	January 3, 2023	978-1-63858-687-6
3	March 21, 2023	978-1-63858-926-6
4	August 15, 2023	978-1-68579-586-3
5	October 3, 2023	978-1-68579-769-0
6	February 6, 2024	978-1-68579-779-9
7	June 11, 2024	979-8-88843-470-3

== Reception ==
Erica Friedman of Yuricon praised the story and Satis' art in her volume 1 review and thought it noteworthy that the series included realistic elements not always seen in yuri titles, saying that "The last thing that really made the story stand out was that men exist in this world, as relatives and colleagues. It's not one of the all-women-all-the-time worlds. This world is the world." She went on to include it in her Top Ten Yuri of 2016.
