= Bolesław Barbacki =

Polish painter

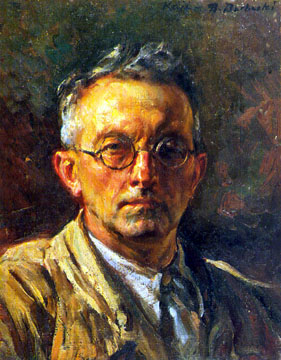
Autoportrait (1940)

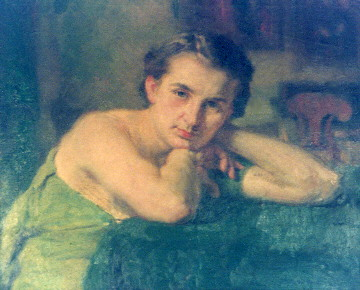
Stefania Kulkowa

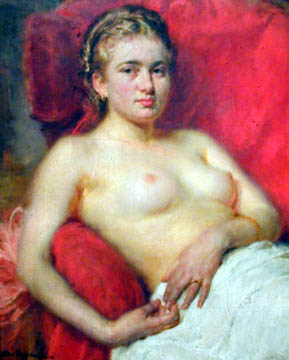
Her Majesty Youth

Bolesław Barbacki (10 October 1891 – 21 August 1941) was a Polish painter.

In World War II he was arrested by the Gestapo and shot.
