= Bolesław Ocias =

Polish conductor, composer, and educator

Bolesław Ocias (30 May 1929 – 16 June 2019) was a Polish conductor, composer and pedagog. His most important works include, among others: Concertino for piano and orchestra and Missa solemnis for choir and orchestra.

== Biography ==
Bolesław Ocias was born in Częstochowa on 30 May 1929. He entered the novitiate of the Salesians Fathers meeting in Kraków in 1945. There, as a student in the seminary, he studied philosophy for two years. In 1948 he began to teach in the School of the Salesian Society in Przemysl. He was educated playing the harmonium, trumpet, and cello, as well as in theoretical subjects. His teachers at the time were, among others, Feliks Rączkowski and Vladislav Oćwieja. Ocias died on 16 June 2019, at the age of 90.
