= Puls (company) =

American tech services company

- Type: Private
- Industry: On-demand tech services
- Founded: 2015
- Founders: Eyal Ronen; Itai Hirsch
- Headquarters: San Francisco, United States
- Area served: United States
- Number of employees: 100
- Website: https://puls.com/

Puls (stylized in all lowercase) is a San Francisco–based startup founded by Eyal Ronen and Itai Hirsch in 2015. The company provides in-home services such as repairs to all household appliances. The user books an appointment for a technician to visit the user's location to fix said problem.

== History ==
In 2015, the company was launched as CellSavers and was focused on repairing mobile phones and tablets. In 2017, the company was renamed Puls and started to offer broader solutions. In 2018, Puls announced a new HDTV antenna installation service.

In August 2018, following a $50 million C round investment, Puls announced expansion to additional home services or supporting "Everything with an 'ON' Switch". In September 2018, Puls was selected by LinkedIn as one of the top 25 US startups, at the 11th place. In 2019, TV-maker TCL announced it had partnered with Puls to provide a 5,000-person installation support team.

In February 2023, Puls announced the launch of their Generative AI assistant, an AI tool using natural language processing to understand and respond to users home care questions in order to provide real time support time and price estimates.

== Offered Services ==
Year	Service
2015	Phone repair
2017	Smart home installation and set up
2017	TV installation and calibration
2018	Antenna installation
2018	Security cameras and security systems installation
2018	Garage door repair

== Partners ==
Apple partnered with Puls to provide home-based Genius Bar–type repairs and demonstrations to the customers.

In January 2018, Antop announced a partnership with Puls for HDTV antenna installation service.

Puls attracts great to satisfactory feedback, with Facebook showing an average feedback score of 4.1/5 stars, with 5,5443 reviews, as of January 2023. Many reviewers speak highly of the fast booking to appointment time, prompt, courteous and knowledgeable technicians and speedy repair times. Similar sentiments are on Better Business Bureau, which gives 3.88/5 stars with 480 reviews.

== Finance ==
Announced in August 2018, the company raised $50 million from Temasek Holdings as the lead investor. In August 2017, the startup raised about $25 million series B round led by Red Dot Capital Partners along with Samsung Next, Maverick Ventures and Kreos Capital, as well as existing investors Sequoia Capital and Carmel Ventures, who previously invested $15 million Series A round in August 2016. Prior to that, it had raised $3 million in a seed round from Sequoia Capital in December 2015.
