= Bolesław Szadkowski =

Polish footballer

Personal information
- Date of birth: 2 October 1945
- Place of birth: Łódź, Poland
- Date of death: 3 October 2005 (aged 60)
- Place of death: Łódź, Poland
- Height: 1.80 m (5 ft 11 in)
- Position: Defender

Senior career*
Years	Team	Apps	(Gls)
1959–1965	ŁKS Łódź		
1965–1966	Zawisza Bydgoszcz	24	(0)
1966–1974	ŁKS Łódź		

International career
1968–1969	Poland	7	(0)
- * Club domestic league appearances and goals

Bolesław Szadkowski (2 October 1945 – 3 October 2005) was a Polish footballer who played as a defender.

He earned seven caps for the Poland national team from 1968 to 1969.
