= Bolesław Fleszar =

Polish politician (1933–2023)

Member of the Senate of Poland
- In office 18 June 1989 – 25 November 1991

Personal details
- Born: Bolesław Józef Fleszar; 17 December 1933 Wólka Pełkińska, Poland
- Died: 30 November 2023 (aged 89)
- Party: KO "S"
- Education: University of Łódź
- Occupation: Chemist

Bolesław Józef Fleszar (17 December 1933 – 30 November 2023) was a Polish chemist and politician. A member of the Solidarity Citizens' Committee, he served in the Senate from 1989 to 1991.

Fleszar died on 30 November 2023, at the age of 89.
