= Robert Frenay =

- Born: 1946
- Occupations: Philosopher, Author, Public Speaker

Robert Frenay (1946-January 27, 2007) was an American author and lecturer who described and advocated a green or ecologically conscious approach to technological development and development of human civilization. Frenay lived in the state of New York dividing his time between New York City and Bridgeport in upstate New York.

== Early life ==
Frenay began his professional life as an artist and photographer, an architectural draftsman and graphic designer. After spending some time as a jazz critic, jazz magazine publisher and jazz event coordinator, Frenay went to work for various periodicals doing article research. He ended up as a feature writer and contributing editor at Audubon Magazine after heading up an effort to raise money and acquire property for a green community plan in upstate New York. He covered developments in nature and technology for the magazine.

== Pulse ==
Frenay left his editing position at Audubon to work on his first book, Pulse: The Coming Age of Systems and Machines Inspired by Living Things (also published with the title Pulse: How Nature is inspiring the technology of the 21st century). The book was published in 2006. Frenay also maintained a website where the entire text of his book was available for free online along with links to the original sources in the text, relevant websites and frequent posts from the author and others regarding the various subjects of the book: environmentalism, anti-corporatism, green machine mentality, ecology, environmental thinking, etc. The book covered a number of distinct topics, leading reviewer Aparna Sreenivasan from the San Francisco Chronicle to write that "there is no question that a lot of solid research went into compiling these fascinating stories. The main criticism is that the many ideas that Frenay describes sometime seem to lack a common thread."

== Philosophical and/or political views ==
Frenay sought to convey a history of technological development through a machine age into a period that is just beginning which he regarded as a new biological age of technology in which computer memory will be based on DNA, computer software will work according to the logic of human emotions, human systems and human inventions will meld into a new biology based relationship. His book advocated recycling of all waste, greater control of corporations to prevent pollution and waste, government support of environment-based technology development. His view was a positive vision of future industrial, military, agricultural and commercial technological developments. While the basis of his book was a single idea, he reflected that idea throughout history, cultural philosophy, technological change and invention as he "charted the shift from machines to biology bolstered by computers: a type of 'new biology' in which human systems and machines meld to form new possibilities".

On his website, Frenay wrote "PULSE is a book of ideas, a philosophy disguised as pop science. While it offers gee-whiz stories about cutting-edge technology, these stories are also meant as parables. Like Aesop's fables, they aim to illustrate something more—in this case the core dynamics of how living systems work".

Frenay also sought to describe a mode of invention, a mentality of human development based in discovery of humanity's natural, evolutionary direction and modality rather than purely atavistic or profit-motivated industrial development. He didn't describe this mode of development as a vision of a possible way of becoming a future human civilization but rather sought to demonstrate that this was the inevitable refined direction of human development. "According to Frenay, humanity is on the cusp of a new evolutionary change, where we are likely to see emotional computers, ships that move like swimming fish, and accelerated evolution."

Shortly after the publication of Pulse in April, 2006, Frenay was diagnosed with pancreatic cancer, and succumbed to the disease, dying on January 26, 2007.

== Bibliography ==
- Pulse: The Coming Age of Systems and Machines Inspired by Living Things. New York : Farrar, Straus and Giroux, 2006. 978-0374113278
- Pulse: How Nature is inspiring the technology of the 21st century. London : Little, Brown, 2006. 978-0-316-64051-0

== See also ==
- autobiography
- biography
