= Bolesław Cybis =

Polish painter, sculptor, and muralist

- Born: 6 June 1895; Massandra, Russian Empire
- Died: May 30, 1957 (aged 61); Trenton, New Jersey, United States
- Known for: Sculpture
- Movement: Figurative art, Realism

Bolesław Cybis (1895–1957) was a Polish painter, sculptor, and muralist.

== Early life ==
Bolesław Cybis was born on July 23, 1895, in Vilnius, a part of the Russian Empire at that time. He received various athletic awards for gymnastic excellence during his school days in Warsaw. In 1915, he attended St. Petersburg Academy of Fine Arts while his father, a noted architect and engineer (said to have designed Peterhoff, the summer palace of the mother of Czarina Maria Feodorovna) was designing and building in Russia.

In 1921, the White Russian cause collapsed and Cybis took refuge in Constantinople where he lived and worked with artists Constantin Alajalov and Pavel Tchelitchev. He supported himself by sketching portraits in cafes, painting sidewalk advertisements for theatres, painting murals in nightclubs and cafes, painting and designing stage backdrops for the ballet, and fashioning clay pipes in ornate designs from native clays. One of his first "paid jobs" was a gigantic billboard advertising Nestle's chocolate.

By 1923 he had saved enough money for transportation home to Warsaw, where he entered the Warsaw School of Fine Arts. Upon graduation, he was appointed a professor at the academy and traveled extensively throughout Europe recording his experiences in his art while studying the Old Masters and emulating their techniques. In 1926 he married Marja Tym, a fellow artist and student at the academy.

== Painting career ==
Cybis' paintings, sculptures, and murals won him recognition in Paris, Geneva, Munich, Frankfurt, Moscow, St. Petersburg, Bucharest and Vienna. From 1926 to 1930 he was fascinated by the peasants of the country side whom he likened to 15th century medieval portraits of the masters. Over the next four years he painted a series of peasant portraits now in various museum collections. During the 1930s his work first appeared by invitation in fine art exhibits and museums in the United States, where Studio Magazine (Contemporary... Masters," April 1934) found his paintings "a striking example... reminiscent of Leonardo da Vinci." In 1932 he lived in Tripoli, where some of his finest canvases were painted, and where he painted experimentally with cement. Over the next few years he exhibited paintings at the Brooklyn Museum of Art and at museums in Chicago and Dayton, Ohio, as well as in the International Exhibition of Paintings at the Carnegie Institute, Pittsburgh and the Albright-Knox Art Gallery in Buffalo, NY. His ceiling mural was awarded the Grand Prix at the International "Art and Technique" in Paris.

In 1939 Cybis and his wife, Marja, an accomplished artist in her own right came to the United States to paint a series of murals commissioned by their government in the "Hall of Honor" at the 1939 New York World's Fair. Here he completed two frescos: "Poles Fighting for American Independence" and "Central Industrial District and Gdynia." Also shown at the fair was a textured tapestry rug, "Walking through a Park", designed by Cybis and his wife. He then toured the U.S., sketching and painting Native American Indians.

== Sculpture career ==
Unable to return to their homeland after the outbreak of World War II, the Cybises chose to become citizens of the United States. Although he had spent many years as a painter, Cybis was also fascinated with three-dimensional porcelain art, and the couple soon established Cybis Studio at the Steinway Mansion in Astoria, New York, in 1940. Here they created cold cast chalk ware sculptures known as Papka in the fashion of the great European Studios they had known during their youth.

After relocating to Trenton, New Jersey, Cybis turned his attention fully to china and porcelain sculpture using techniques derived from his study of the Old Masters in Europe. "Concept,...training, direction and execution -- Cybis knew that not one of these elements can be neglected in the complex process which ends as fine porcelain sculpture: for he was not a man to be tolerant of less than perfection. That his instincts were correct was quickly proven: in less than two years, Cybis achieved recognition as a leader in the field of porcelain art." In 1942 Cybis along with two investors, Harry Wilson and Harvey Greenburg, founded the Cordey China Company and in 1953 Cybis founded the Cybis Studio. The studio produced porcelain works at 65 Norman Avenue in Trenton until closing it doors to the public in the early 2000s. A website was online for several years advertising items for sale by special order but that was removed mid 2019. The company is now closed.
