= Pulß =

Pulß is a German surname, derived from the Slavic forename Boleš, a short form of Bolesław, meaning "great glory."

Notable people with the surname include:

- Irmgard Neumann, née Pulß, East German politician
- Henning Pulß, writer and director

== See also ==
- Puls (surname)
