= List of Mardi Gras Krewes in Louisiana =

Louisiana Mardi Gras organizations

List of Mardi Gras Krewes in Louisiana is a list of Krewes in the U.S. state of Louisiana. There are over 100 active Mardi Gras krewes in the state. There are over 150 smaller walking and sub-krewes.

== New Orleans ==
=== Parade Krewes ===
There are more than 8o Krewes in the area, with 40 considered major Krewes. 2026 saw 68 authorized Krewe processions in the shorter 43-day season with over 34,000 riders. The number of floats in 2026 for major parades was 382. Orleans Parish had 40 parades, Jefferson Parish (East and west bank) had 11, Lafourche Parish had 15, Lake Charles (SWLA) had over 10, Baton Rouge Area had over 10, and Northshore (Slidell/Covington) had over 20.

- 610 Stompers: Adult dance group
- Feijão & Green Beans Parade: sub-Krewe of the Red Beans Krewe.
- Funky Uptown Krewe (Streetcar)
- Intergalactic Krewe of Chewbacchus (Marigny): Walking micro-krewe with Star Wars themes. 3,000 members and 100 subkrewes.
- Knights of Babylon
- Knights of Chaos
- Knights of Sparta
- KOE (formally Krewe of Elvis)
- Krewe Bohème
- Krewe de Jeanne d'Arc`
- Krewe du Vieux Carré
- Krewe of Alla
- Krewe of Antheia (St. Tammany): All-female 200-member Krewe.
- Krewe of Bacchus (Super Krewe)
- Krewe of Bosom Buddies (French Quarter)
- Krewe of Carrollton
- Krewe of Choctaw
- Krewe of Cleopatra: Named floats; Cleopatra's Nile – The River of Life, a quad-float, Queen Tutt, a quad-float, Cleopatra’s Royal Barge, built in Spain and in every float since 1974. There were 250 members in the inaugural run, 3,200 riders, and 57 floats in 2026.
- Krewe of Cork (French Quarters): Wine-themed costumes with Wine Police in golf carts.
- Krewe of Crescent City
- Krewe of Druids (1932) Rolls with Krewe of Alla, which has floats and marching groups.
- Krewe of Endymion (Super crew)
- Krewe of Freret
- Krewe of Iris
- Krewe of Joan of Arc: (French Quarter)
- Krewe of King Arthur
- Krewe of Little Rascals: 10 floats with 200 riders.
- Krewe of Mid-City
- Krewe of Mona Lisa and MoonPie
- Krewe of Morpheus
- Krewe Mosaïque (French Quarter): Walking Art Installation. Throwes are rare hand-decorated mosaic tiles.
- Krewe of Muses
- Krewe of Nefertiti: 14-float parade.
- Krewe of OAK
- Krewe of Okeanos
- Krewe of Orleanians Orpheus
- Krewe of Orpheus (1993 Super Krewe) co-founded by Harry Connick Jr. with Harry Connick Sr., and Sonny Borey.
- Krewe of Pontchartrain
- Krewe of Proteus
- Krewe of Pygmalion
- Krewe of Thoth
- Krewe of Titans:
- Krewe of Tucks
- Krewe of Zulu Throws the prized Zulu Coconuts.
- Le Krewe d'Etat
- Merry Antoinettes,
- Mistick Krewe of Comus
- Muff-A-Lottas,
- Mystic Krewe of Druids
- Mystic Krewe of Femme Fatale
- Mystic Krewe of Hermes
- Mystic Krewe of Nyx
- NOMTOC Krewe (New Orleans Most Talked Of Club)
- Phunny Phorty Fellows Krewe (Streetcar)
- Pussyfooters,
- Red Beans Krewe
- Rex (krewe)
- Roux La La
- Royal Krewes:
- Society of Champs Elysée: (French Quarter)
- Storyville Baby Dolls: Walking dance Krewe. Creole and African American culture exhibits cultural resistance.
- 'tit Rex: shoebox-themed microKrewe and mini parade.

== St. Bernard Parish ==
- Knights of Nemesis: The only one Krewe left in the Parish. 15 floats with 330 riders.
- Former Krewes
  - Krewes of Amor,
  - Krewe of Arabi (1932–1985):
  - Krewe of Gladiators (1974–2005):
  - Krewe of Juno,
  - Krewe of Jupiter,
  - Krewe of Oz (1981–1984),
  - Krewe of Pan (1971–1978),
  - Krewe of Shangri-La (1973–2010): Formerly the largest all-female krewe in Carnival in Chalmette for 18 years. It moved its route to New Orleans and eventually disbanded. There were three children's parades in the Parish.
  - Krewe of Sinbad,
  - Sprites (1968–1978), and
  - Vikings of Tyr

== Metairie ==
- Krewe of Excalibur (250-member co-ed):

== Baton Rouge area ==
- Addis Mardi Gras (Addis)
- Krewe of Artemis (Downtown Baton Rouge): Only all-female krewe with a nighttime downtown parade.
- Krewe of Ascension Mardi Gras Mambo (Gonzales
- Krewe of Canines (West Feliciana Parish, St. Francisville)
- Krewe of Comogo (Plaquemine)
- Krewe of Denham Springs (Denham Springs)
- Krewe of Chemin Neuf (New Roads)
- Krewe of Omega (Hammond)
- Krewe of Orion (Scotlandville): A nighttime parade with colorful floats and masked riders.
- Krewe of Oshun (Scotlandville): 500-members.
- Krewe of Royalty (Plaquemine
- Krewe of Shenandoah (Shenandoah – Baton Rouge)
- Krewe of Southdowns (Southdowns – Baton Rouge)
- Krewe of Tickfaw River (Springfield)
- Le Krewe Mystique de la Capitale (Downtown Baton Rouge)
- Mid City Gras: (Mid City – Baton Rouge): Inclusive community with a lawnmower brigade.
- Mystic Krewe of Mutts Parade (Downtown Baton Rouge): Annual CAAWS Fundraiser.
- New Roads Lions Club Mardi Gras (New Roads)
- Spanish Town Mardi Gras (Downtown Baton Rouge): The largest parade with pink flamingos and satirical themes.
- Zachary Mardi Gras (Zachary.

== Lake Charles ==
The Lake Charles area has more than 60 krewes.

- Krewe of Omega (1970)
- Krewe de la Noblesse (1985)
- Krewe du Sauvage (2003)
- Krewe de la Famille (1979)
- Krewe of Illusions (1989)

== Lafayette ==
Over two dozen Krewes operate under the umbrella of the Greater Southwest Louisiana Mardi Gras Association, with 19 krewes. The organization organizes “Le Festival de Mardi Gras a’ Lafayette” at Cajun Field. The 2026 season saw the Culinary Queens, Krewe of Jefferson, and Krewe of Symphony cut for various reasons.

- Children’s Carnival Krewe of Versailles
- Krewe of Allons University of Louisiana (UL) Ragin' Cajuns Krewe's Kickoff Parade.
- Krewe d’Argent
- Krewe de St. Martin
- Krewe Des Bon Amis
- Krewe of Atlantis
- Krewe of Attakapas
- Krewe of Bonaparte
- Krewe of Camelot
- Krewe of des Jeunes Amis
- Krewe of Gabriel
- Krewe of Karencro
- Krewe of Oberon
- Krewe of Olympus
- Krewe of Triton
- Krewe of Troubadours
- Krewe of Victoria
- Krewe of Xanadu
- Mystic Krewe of Apollo de Lafayette
- Mystic Krewe of Majesty

== Central Louisiana ==
Central Louisiana (Alexandria); has twenty-two Krewes organized through the Alexandria Mardi Gras Association.

- AMGA Krewes Parade: final parade of the season.
- Krewe Bayou Le Roux
- Krewe of Alexandra
- Krewe of Anastasia
- Krewe of Apollo
- Krewe of Boogaloo
- Krewe of Calliope
- Krewe of Camelot
- Krewe of Chaos
- Krewe Fleur de Lis
- Krewe of Gratiae
- Krewe of Hera
- Krewe of Kouchon
- Krewe of Medea
- Krewe of Montgomery Animal Hospital
- Krewe of Paragon Casino
- Krewe of Parlangua
- Krewe of Rapides
- Krewe of Revelry
- Krewe of Sirena
- Krewe of S’iriser
- Krewe of Sophia
- Krewe of Twelfth Night

== St. Tammany Parish (Northshore) ==
- Golden Sioux Mardi Gras Indians
- Honey Island Clydesdales (24 floats): Only six- hitch Clydesdale team in the South.
- Kids Krewe (Mandeville): The sponsor is the Children's Museum of St. Tammany.
- Krewe du Pooch (Mandeville: A dog-themed walking parade.
- Krewe of Bilge (1978): A boat parade in Slidell/Eden Isles)
- Krewe of Eve (Mandeville): The town's first all-female krewe. Six members in 1987, and now over 400 with 33 floats.
- Krewe of Paws (Slidell)
- Krewe of Poseidon (Slidell), which was active in Baton Rouge, is the largest carnival krewe on the North Shore.
- Krewe of Push Mow (Abita Springs): A satirical parade with decorated lawnmowers being pushed.
- Krewe of Selene (1998, Slidell): An all-female krewe known for nighttime parades featuring 17 floats.
- Krewe of Tchefuncte (Madisonville): Maritime history boat parade.
- Mande Milkshakers' (all-female walking/dance krewe): Kicks off the Mande Kings Day Parade and Festival Walking Parade & Festival
- The Fools of Misrule (2011, Covington): Kicks off the Northshore parade.

== Suspect arrested ==
The Okaloosa County Sheriff’s Office apprehended a suspect for allegedly planning a mass shooting at a Louisiana Mardi Gras venue. He was in a hotel and taken without incident.
