= Krewe of Orpheus =

New Orleans Mardi Gras organization

- Named after: Orpheus
- Formation: 1993; 33 years ago
- Founders: Harry Connick Sr., Harry Connick Jr., Sonny Borey
- Founded at: New Orleans, LA.
- Type: Carnival Krewe
- Location: New Orleans, LA.
- Website: kreweoforpheus.com

The Krewe of Orpheus is a New Orleans Mardi Gras super krewe and social organization.

== History and Formation ==
Orpheus is a musically themed krewe taking its name from Orpheus of Classical mythology. The Krewe of Orpheus was founded by Harry Connick Jr., his father Harry Connick Sr., Sonny Borey, and others. When the krewe had their first parade on February 14, 1994, there was a record high 700 riders on their parade, and they had then already established themselves as a super krewe.

== Membership ==
The Krewe accepts members of either gender and any race or ethnicity, and quickly became one of New Orleans' largest, after it was founded in 1993. Ridership is open to dues paid members. Krewe of Orpheus was the first super krewe to include both men and women.

== Parade ==
The Krewe of Orpheus parades on the Uptown Route, including Napoleon Avenue, St. Charles Avenue and Canal Street on Lundi Gras (Fat Monday) - the day before Mardi Gras (Fat Tuesday). The parade ends inside the Ernest N. Morial Convention Center where Orpheuscapade begins.

Krewe of Orpheus utilize flambeaux to light the parade route.

=== Parade Themes ===
- 2027 Mystical and Marvelous… Madness and Merriment
- 2026 All The World’s A Stage
- 2025 As Above So Below
- 2024 Music of the Spheres
- 2023 Dark Dictums of Childhood
- 2022 Glacial Tomes and Conflagrations
- 2021 No Parade Due to COVID-19
- 2020 Beastly Kingdoms
- 2019 The Orpheus Imaginarium
- 2018 The Folly of Astoroth
- 2017 On the Wave of a Dream
- 2016 The Wizard's Bestiary
- 2015 The Magic of an Ordinary Day
- 2014 The Enchanted World
- 2013 Orpheus, 20 Years of Rhythm, Rhyme and Revelry
- 2012 Nonsense and Tomfoolery
- 2011 Visions of Other Worlds
- 2010 Delectable Delights
- 2009 The Whimsical World of How and Why
- 2008 Cocktail Concoctions
- 2007 Tales of Transformation
- 2006 Signs and Superstitions
- 2005 Dance of the Hours
- 2004 Serenades of the Seasons - a tribute to the sights, colors and sounds that mark the changing tides of the year.
- 2003 A Flourish of Fetes and Feasts
- 2002 Fiendish Fanfares of Fantasy
- 2001 Crescendos of Creation
- 2000 Musical Metamorphosis
- 1999 New Orleans Premieres at the French Opera House
- 1998 Troubador Tales
- 1997 Tuneful Tales of the Brothers Grimm
- 1996 Music of Mythology
- 1995 Lyrical Legend of Orpheus
- 1994 Rhythm, Rhyme & Revelry

=== Celebrity Monarchs ===
- 2027 Sharon Osbourne
- 2026 Noah Wyle, Jonathan Silverman, Jennifer Finnigan, Jimmi Simpson, Will Forte, Joey Fatone
- 2025 Bianca Del Rio
- 2024 Neil Patrick Harris, David Burtka; Taylor Dayne
- 2023 Joey Fatone, Darren Criss
- 2022 Finn Jones, Nicole Scherzinger, and Tyrus
- 2020 Bryan Cranston, Charlie Day
- 2019 Mario Lopez
- 2018 Keegan-Michael Key, Jaime Alexander
- 2017 Will Forte
- 2016 Nathan Fillion
- 2015 Dierks Bentley
- 2014 Quentin Tarantino
- 2013 Gary Sinise, Trombone Shorty
- 2012 Bret Michaels, Cyndi Lauper
- 2010 Steve Zahn, Sean Payton, Imagination Movers, Paul Mainieri
- 2009 Joan Rivers, James Belushi, Reno 911!
- 2008 Hélio Castroneves, Sidney Torres, Lance Bass, Kevin Meaney, Salt-n-Pepa, Christian LeBlanc, Ricky Paull Goldin, Sean Payton, Josh Gracin
- 2007 Patricia Clarkson, Sean Payton, Harry Connick Jr.
- 2006 Steven Seagal, Josh Hartnett
- 2005 Sawyer Brown, Toby Keith
- 2004 Dominic Monaghan, Brad Paisley, Nicole Miller, Harry Connick Jr.
- 2003 Travis Tritt, Harry Connick Jr.
- 2002
- 2001 Glenn Close (grand marshal), Whoopi Goldberg, Hoda Kotb, Harry Connick Jr.
- 2000 Whoopi Goldberg (grand marshal),
- 1999 Debbie Allen, Sandra Bullock, Forest Whitaker,
- 1998
- 1997 Stevie Wonder, Quincy Jones, Anne Rice, Harry Connick Jr.
- 1996 The Road Rules gang from MTV, Laurence Fishburne, Jay Thomas ('96 King of Orpheus), Anne Rice ('96 muse of Orpheus), Harry Connick Jr.
- 1995 Anne Rice
- 1994 Little Richard, Branford Marsalis, Vanessa R. Williams, Dan Aykroyd, Harry Connick Jr.
Other celebrity monarchs for the Krewe of Orpheus include Camryn Manheim, Debbie Allen, Tommy Tune, James Brown, David Copperfield, Delta Burke, Gerald McRaney, Josh Gracin and Christian LeBlanc.

=== Musical Tributes ===
In 2013, Harry Connick Jr. released the album Smokey Mary in celebration of the 20th anniversary of the Krewe. He also wrote and recorded a song for his 1994 album She, called "Here Comes the Big Parade". The song's music video shows clips from floats in the parade. The floats have a large amount of flowers, gilding and gold leaf. The flowers are made out of cardboard, wire, paint, gold leafing, some of paper-mâché, etc.

=== Floats ===
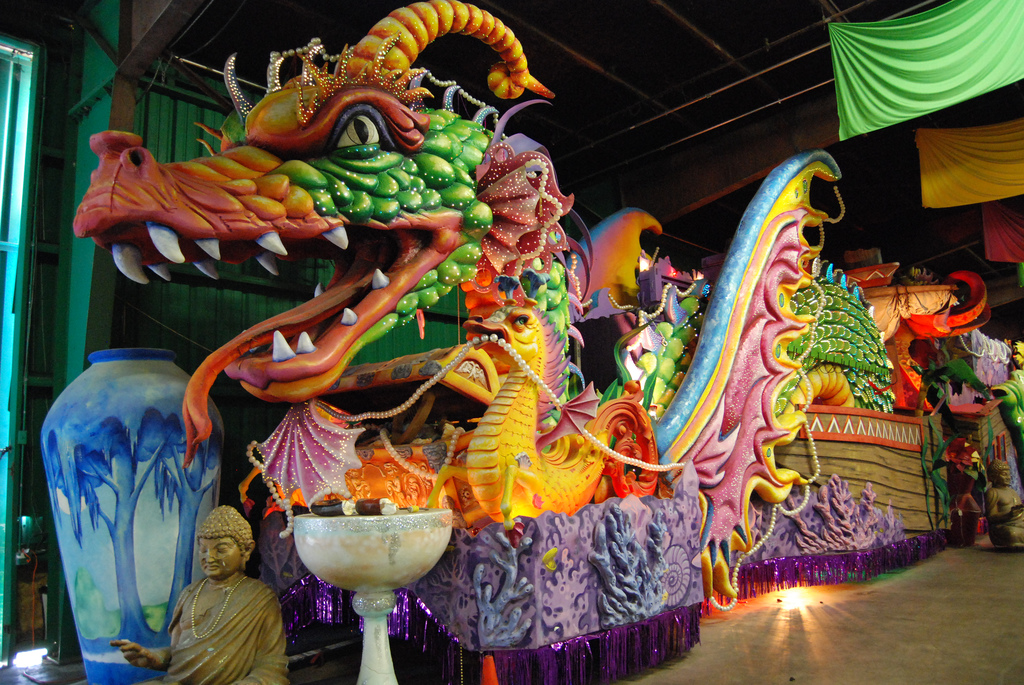
The Leviathan stored at Mardi Gras World, New Orleans

Most years, the krewe rolls with 38 floats. However, some years the Krewe may roll with as many as 43 floats. Iconic floats include:

- In 2004, the Krewe of Orpheus bought the Dolly Trolley, the original horse-dawn bus that was used in the opening of Hello Dolly with Barbra Streisand.
- The Smokey Mary (Smokey Mary) started as an 6 section float and then 2 more sections was later (2013) to be an eight unit float that looks like a [steam locomotive] and is driven by one person Barry Daigle.
- The Orpheus Leviathan Float has been part of the parade since 1998. It's a three unit, 139-foot (42 m), float, and the first Carnival float to use extensive fiber optic lighting.
- Trojan Horse

=== Throws ===
Trinkets, collectables, masks, and beads tossed by hand from riders of the floats are called throws. Collectible throws from Orpheus include the Orpheus emblem beads, stuffed animals, signature beads, light-up Orpheus medallion beads, custom print go-cups, three different types of doubloons, masks, and 4-foot-long stuffed dragons. The Krewe's signature throws are hand-decorated tambourines made by members for the parade.

== Orpheuscapade ==
The Orpheus parade ends inside the Ernest N. Morial Convention Center where Orpheuscapade begins. Orpheuscapade is a post-parade black-tie party that includes live music, food, and dancing. It is open to the public by paid admission. It is estimated Orpheuscapade draws a crowd of over 5000 people each year.

== Additional notes ==
- This krewe does not have any connection to:
  - the first Krewe of Orpheus: a ball krewe in Orleans Parish (1940s, 1950s)
  - The Original Krewe of Orpheus: a parade krewe in Mandeville, Louisiana (founded 1987)
