= Krewe of Mid-City =

New Orleans Mardi Gras krewe

- Abbreviation: KMC
- Formation: 1933; 93 years ago
- Type: Male and Female Carnival Krewe
- Location: Mid-City, New Orleans, LA.
- Members: 350 (250 Riders)
- Website: krewemidcity.com

Krewe of Mid-City is the 5th oldest continually-parading New Orleans Mardi Gras krewe.

== History and formation ==
Founded in 1933 by Charles A. Bourgeois, the original members were men from the Mid-City Civic Association. The first parade comprised six small floats drawn by mules, a handful of marching bands and riders on horseback.

Since The death of Float designer Betty Ray Kern Sister of Blaine Kern, 1999 the parade floats were designed and decorated by New Orleans Artist and float designer Ricardo Pustanio. Pustanio designed the parade from 1999-2020.

== Membership ==
Krewe of Mid-City membership is limited to 350 members. Joining involves receiving an invitation from an existing member, completing an application process, approval of the application by the board of directors, and timely payment of dues.

== Parade ==
Krewe of Mid-City parades on Dimanche Gras, the Sunday prior to Fat Tuesday, on the uptown route. The parade follows the uptown route for parades starting at Napoleon Avenue and Magazine Street; proceed north to St. Charles; proceed east on St. Charles to Lee Circle continuing on St. Charles to Canal Street.

The parade is unique for its one-of-a-kind foil-covered floats. Originally designed and decorated by Betty Ray Kern until her death in 1992. And by Ricardo Pustanio from 1999-2020.

=== Parade themes ===
- 1934 Romance of 1934
- 1935 Familiar Themes of Fairyland
- 1936 Passion for Music
- 1937 Dreams of Youth
- 1938 The Life of King Tutankhamen
- 1939 Familiar Airs
- 1940 Playtime, Pastime, Sports
- 1941 Academy Awards
- 1942 No Parade
- 1943 No Parade
- 1944 No Parade
- 1945 No Parade
- 1946 Rio in the Times of the Viceroys
- 1947 Toyland
- 1948 Uncle Remus Says
- 1949 Characters We Love
- 1950 The Comics
- 1951 Radio and Television Programs
- 1952 The Circus
- 1953 Once Upon a Time
- 1954 Peter Pan
- 1955 Candy
- 1956 Magic
- 1957 Songs Children Sing
- 1958 Memories
- 1959 A Day in the Park
- 1960 Children's Hobbies
- 1961 See the U.S.A.
- 1962 Let's Go to the Beach
- 1963 Everything from A to Z
- 1964 Pages from a Coloring Book
- 1965 Happiness is Everything
- 1966 Stories that Live Forever
- 1967 Music for Everyone
- 1968 A Tribute to Folklore
- 1969 Did You Ever Say...
- 1970 Chitty Chitty Bang Bang
- 1971 Charlie My Boy
- 1972 Games Children Play
- 1973 One Man's World
- 1974 Costumes of Many Lands
- 1975 Louisiana; Cajuns, Creoles, & Conga
- 1976 The Colonies; Their Birds & Flowers
- 1977 Fairy Tales from Around the World
- 1978 Songs & Stories of the Sea & Sailing
- 1979 Bible Stories
- 1980 Happiness Is...
- 1981 Lanauaae of the Flowers
- 1982 Mid-City's Merry Menagerie
- 1983 Our Golden 50's
- 1984 A Lot of Spinning Going On
- 1985 Don't Rain on My Parade
- 1986 Space Fantasies
- 1987 Flight to Fairy Land
- 1988 Mid-City Sings Love Songs
- 1989 Traveling Along Singing a Song
- 1990 All That's Gold
- 1991 Mid-City Comic Rainbow
- 1992 Might Mite Menu
- 1993 Thanks, Betty Rae Kern
- 1994 Les Bon Temps Roule
- 1995 Check It Out at the Library
- 1996 Kaleidoscope of Kings
- 1997 Hold on to Your Hat
- 1998 Forever Young at 65
- 1999 Love is in the Air
- 2000 Magical Moments of the 20th Century
- 2001 History of Mystery
- 2002 Palindromes
- 2003 Foiled Again
- 2004 The Things We Do for Love
- 2005 Just Another Super Sunday
- 2006 Rode Hard and Put Up Wet
- 2007 Foilicious
- 2008 75 Years Written in Foil
- 2009 Parrotheads in Paradise
- 2010 Mid-City Gets Lucky
- 2011 Mid City Marches On
- 2012 Apocalypso: Party at the End of the World
- 2013 It's About Time
- 2014 50 Shades of Green
- 2015 Dey' All Axed For You!
- 2016 Champagne Kisses and Foil Wrapped Wishes
- 2017 In Vino Veritas
- 2018 Mid City Touring Company
- 2019 Mid-City Thinks Outside the Box
- 2020 Heart Breakers and Head Bangers
- 2021 All parades canceled due to Covid-19 Pandemic
- 2022 Enchantment Under the Sea
- 2023 Louisiana's Bounty
- 2024 Cheers to Ninety Years
- 2025 If Ever A Spring Day So Perfect
- 2026 Lands Far and Beyond

=== Royal court ===
Krewe of Mid-City present a King and Queen annually. Fitting with the Krewe's double-heart logo, the King and Queen of Mid-City are traditionally a married or engaged couple.

=== Throws ===
Trinkets, collectables, masks, and beads tossed by hand from riders of the floats are called throws. Collectible throws from Krewe of Mid-City include heart-shaped mascot dolls, the Captain's pewter anodized doubloons, and krewe-emblem potato chips.
