= Krewe of Tucks =

New Orleans Mardi Gras krewe

- Abbreviation: KoT
- Named after: Friar Tuck
- Formation: 1969; 57 years ago
- Type: Carnival Krewe
- Location: New Orleans, LA.
- Website: kreweoftucks.com

Krewe of Tucks is a New Orleans Mardi Gras krewe.

== History and formation ==
Tucks began in 1969 as a group of Loyola University students applied for a parade permit. The club takes its name from Friar Tuck's, an Uptown New Orleans local gathering hole and pub, where two college students decided to create their own Carnival krewe after unsuccessfully trying to become white flambeau carriers. The parade has grown from a small nighttime parade of pick-up trucks and boats pulled on trailers, into a procession of major proportions. In 1983 the parade became a daytime event and in 1986 the parade route finally stretched to downtown. Past Grand Marshals include a person sporting a Bart Simpson costume, film-maker Spike Lee and members of the New Orleans Saints. Past Kings include John Candy and Eugene Levy. Notable riders have included The Blues Brothers, WWF Wrestlers, MTV's: The Real World New Orleans Cast and Rob Dyrdek, from MTV's fantasy factory.

== Membership ==
Krewe of Tucks admits both men and women stating the only requirement for membership is a desire to put on a magnificent show for the crowds. Even though the club has grown in size and stature with 1800+ riders, Tucks has not lost its sense of humor and maintains an "Animal House" reputation.

== Parade ==
The Krewe of Tucks parades during New Orleans Mardi Gras, on the Saturday before Mardi Gras. The parade begins on Napoleon Avenue parading down St. Charles Avenue and ends on Canal Street where the post-parade blowout, the Tucks Extravaganza, kicks into high gear.

=== Parade themes ===
Krewe of Tucks parade themes are known for irreverence and satire. Floats, including the King's Throne, a giant toilet, as well as the Queen of Tucks, surrounded by her maids dressed in "French Maid" fashion attire.

- 2026 Tucks Finally Cracks
- 2025 Tucks Loves A Great Pair
- 2024 Tucks Faces the Music
- 2023 Tucks Can’t Drive 55
- 2022 Tucks Razes the Bar
- 2020 Tucks Hits the Sweet Spot
- 2019 Tucks Gets Sick
- 2018 50 Shades of Gold (50th Anniversary)
- 2017 Tucks Happens
- 2016 Tucks in the Hood
- 2015 Krewe of Tucks Saves the Day
- 2014 Livin’ the Sportin' Life
- 2013 Tucks Uncovers History
- 2012 Tucks Gets Culture
- 2011 iTucks: What's APPening
- 2010 Tucks Faces Reality
- 2009 Cone of Horrors - Tucks, The Mother of all Parades
- 2008 Tucks Tops Faughty and Still Naughty (40th Anniversary)
- 2007 Tucks Knows What It Means To Miss New Orleans
- 2006 Tucks Characters, No Rhyme or Reason
- 2005 Tucks Premieres THE BIG EASY SINerama
- 2004 New Orleans Politics, A Mardi Gras Fairy Tale
- 2003 Tucks Smells Something Fishy In New Orleans
- 2002 Tucks Does The Wild Thing
- 2001 Toys For Tucks
- 2000 Tucks Official Book of Mardi Gras
- 1999 Tuck's New Orleans Style
- 1998 Tuck’s 30 ‘Note’torious Off-Key Years
- 1997 Tucks Rolls the House
- 1996 Lose-iana Down the Tube
- 1995 Little City Hall of Horrors
- 1994 It's A Tucks World After All (A Dizzy Animation)
- 1993 Tucks on a Silver Platter
- 1992 The World Is Our Playground
- 1991 Only in New Orleans
- 1990 No Pun Intended
- 1989 Ghost of a Chance
- 1988 Tucks Time Machine (Boats to Floats)
- 1987 Tucks On Vacation
- 1986 Mardi Gras' Biggest Party
- 1985 Louisiana Lifestyles and Legends
- 1984 Cajun Creatures With All That Jazz
- 1983 The Greatest Show on Earth
- 1982 Tucks in Reverse
- 1979 Tucks Goes to the Movies
- 1978 Tucks Discovers Winter Wonderland
- 1977 Tucks in Outer Space
- 1976 A Salute to the Zoo (The Zoo Revue)
- 1975 Bayou Boogie
- 1974 American Graffiti
- 1973 My Ding-A-Ling
- 1972 Phi Kappa Theta Presents the Krewe of Tucks
- 1971 Acid Rock!
- 1970 Rock Bottom (Top of Nothing, Bottom of Everything)
- 1969

=== Iconic floats ===
- Ye Royal Out House
- Ye Royal Bath is the only float in Mardi Gras with a giant functioning slide into a giant hot-tub
- The Funky Tucks is a 3-Float tandem which boasts cages flocking each corner of the float with Cage Dancers inside.
- The S.S. Tucks Booze Cruise is a crew ship themed float to honor the Krewe of Tucks going from "Boats to Floats."
- The Tucksedeauxs is an art deco float designed as a giant champagne bottle pouring bubbles into a Krewe of Tucks goblet with dancing ladies.

=== Throws ===
Trinkets, collectables, masks, and beads tossed by hand from riders of the floats are called throws. Collectible throws include the Tucks emblem beads, stuffed animals, signature beads, light-up medallion beads, custom print go-cups, three different types of doubloons, stuffed toilet paper doll, toilet sunglasses, and hand decorated toilet bowl brushes.

Leading up to parade day Krewe of Tucks hosts several events, fundraisers, and community service projects throughout the city for members to attend. Most notably, the Tucks has partnered with Magnolia Community Services, an organization and school dedicated to helping special needs students work with Tucks in designing Signature Throw Items. In 2017, the students from Magnolia created over 10,000 hand decorated Plungers which went into the hands of all Mardi Gras Revilers on parade day.

== Tucks Extravaganza ==
Tucks Extravaganza is a post-parade party inside the Marriott Grand Ball Room on Canal street that includes live music, food, drink, and dancing. It is open to the public by paid admission and attire is costumed (preferred) or casual.

== Tucks Coronation ==
Tucks Coronation Ball is a Carnival ball to crown the new king and queen for the upcoming parade. The court is composed of maids from each float, who costume as French Maids. This ball has taken place at several downtown hotels over the years, such as the Marriott, Sheraton and Hyatt Regency, and includes live music, food, drink, and dancing. Some unique features of the Coronation Ball include Al ‘Carnival Time’ Johnson singing several of his hits with the live band and having a high school marching band leading the Coronation parade, which includes hand-pulled floats, around the ballroom.

== Depictions in media ==
The Krewe of Tucks Parade was depicted in "Confused & Abused", the fifth episode of the MTV reality television series The Real World: New Orleans, which aired in 2010. In the episode, the cast rode a float in the Tucks Parade.

== Other ==
In 2018 the Krewe of Tucks celebrated its 50th anniversary. Included in the celebration was the creation of 4 new floats as well as an animated TUCKS 50th anniversary signature float.
