= Krewe of Thoth =

Mardi gras krewe

- Abbreviation: KoT
- Named after: Thoth
- Formation: 1947; 79 years ago
- Type: Carnival Krewe
- Location: New Orleans, Louisiana, United States.
- Website: thothkrewe.com

Krewe of Thoth is a New Orleans Mardi Gras krewe.

== History and formation ==
The Krewe of Thoth was organized in 1947 in the uptown neighborhood of New Orleans. It presented its first ball and 10 float parade with 50 members in 1948.

The route has traditionally gone into areas not covered by larger krewes. It typically passed a large numbers of hospitals and other care facilities with patients or residents who would not normally get a chance to see a parade.

== Route ==
"The parade of shut-ins", as it has been known, Thoth begins at the corner of Tchoupitoulas and State Streets along the Mississippi River, proceeding westbound on Tchoupitoulas past Children's Hospital of New Orleans before turning north onto Henry Clay Avenue. It proceeds along Henry Clay until reaching Magazine Street, where it turns east. Thoth remains on Magazine until Napoleon Avenue, where it then turns north and follows the route of every other New Orleans parade except Endymion. The parade returns to Tchoupitoulas for its final leg from Canal to Poydras Streets.

Previously, the parade began at Henry Clay and Magazine and proceeded south to Tchoupitoulas, east on Tchoupitoulas to State, then north on State to Magazine; the rest of the route was the same as it is now.

The route was originally created to pass by the Lighthouse for the Blind, Children's Hospital of New Orleans, the John J. Hainkel Home and Rehabilitation Center (formerly called the Home for the Incurables, founded in 1891 to house the terminally ill), the former U.S. Marine Hospital, the Poydras Home and many other locations with people who cannot physically participate in Mardi Gras.

== Parade ==
=== Parade themes ===
- 2026 Thoth Toons
- 2025 Thoth's Bucket List
- 2024 Thoth Goes Festin'
- 2023 Thoth's Diamond Jubilee
- 2022 A Gift For You
- 2021 No parade due to COVID
- 2020 As the World Turns
- 2019 Thoth Salutes the Greats
- 2018 That's the Way We Roll
- 2017 Thoth's Cooking
- 2016 Things with Wings
- 2015 Thoth Says, Express Yourself
- 2014 Thoth Rolls Out the Red Carpet
- 2013 Thoth Salutes the Kings
- 2012 Streets of New Orleans
- 2011 Thoth Goes to College
- 2010 Thoth's All Mixed Up
- 2009 Thoth's Aquatic Adventures
- 2008 Thoth Traditions
- 2007 We the People
- 2006 Thoth on Parade
- 2005 Thoth Travels Below the Equator
- 2004 Animators and Illustrators
- 2003 Thoth's Wonderful World of Color
- 2002 Broadway and the Silver Screen
- 2001 Legends, Lore, and Literature
- 2000 The Peasants are Revolting!
- 1999 In the Beginning
- 1998 Strike Up the Band
- 1997 Thoth's Golden Dynasty
- 1996 That's the Way the Cookie Crumbles
- 1995 Things that Go Bump in the Night
- 1994 Thoth's Wild Weekend
- 1993 Thoth Tells Tales
- 1992 Backwater Buccaneers
- 1991 Which Witch is Which
- 1990 Of Kings' Gold and Greed
- 1989 Dilemmas of the Rich and Famous
- 1988 Feline Fantasies
- 1987 Thoth Remembers
- 1986 In the Days of Camelot
- 1985 Classic Tales... of Fact and Fiction
- 1984 If Only I Could...
- 1983 A Song of the South
- 1982 Music - The Heart of America
- 1981 Mexican Mosaic
- 1980 Pages from Louisiana History
- 1979 All Things Beautiful
- 1978 From the Master's Pen
- 1977 Stories Children Love
- 1976 From the Pages of Our History
- 1975 Movies are Better than Ever
- 1974 The Magic of Music
- 1973 Man's Quest for Knowledge
- 1972 Famous Tales of Fact and Fiction
- 1971 The Imperial Legacy of Italy
- 1970 Age of Myths, Their Gods & Heroes
- 1969 Legends and Lore of the Sea
- 1968 A Legacy of Names
- 1967 Leif the Lucky
- 1966 Tales of Scheherazade
- 1965 Ole King Cole
- 1964 Gifts from the Mysterious East
- 1963 The Age of Chivalry
- 1962 Imagination and Fantasy
- 1961 Evils and Superstitions
- 1960 The Age of Exploration
- 1959 Ancient Arabia
- 1958 Fairy Tales
- 1957 Ancient China
- 1956 Folks from Storybook Land
- 1955 The Age of Chivalry
- 1954 Tales from Fairy Land
- 1953 Gamblers Paradise
- 1952 Lovers of Foreign Lands
- 1951 Childhood Visions
- 1950 Historic Europe
- 1949 The Fantasy of the Storybook
- 1948 Mythological Divinities & Demigods

=== Iconic floats ===
- Thoth Tomb
- Egyptian Jesters
- High Priest of Thoth
- The Royal Barge
- His Majesty's Entourage
- The Valley Of Kings
