= Krewe of Alla =

New Orleans carnival krewe (e. 1932)

Krewe of ALLA
- Named after: Algiers, Louisiana
- Formation: 1932; 94 years ago
- Type: Coed Carnival Krewe
- Location: Uptown, New Orleans, LA.
- Website: kreweofalla.net

The Krewe of ALLA is a coed krewe and social organization.

== History and formation ==
The Krewe of ALLA was formed November 1932, and was originally sponsored by the West Side Carnival and Social Club, Inc. In 1978 the Krewe reorganized as the Golden Gryphon Society, Inc. The name ALLA is taken from ALgiers, LA., where the organization was originally formed.

Originally an all-male Krewe, Alla became co-ed in 2014. The Krewe of Alla celebrated their 90th anniversary with 2022's parade.

== Membership ==
Krewe of ALLA accepts membership from all men and women age 16 and older.

== Parade ==
=== Parade themes ===
- 1966 The Land of Oz
- 1967 The Time Machine
- 1968 Monster Mania
- 1969 History of the Dance
- 1970 Dr. Doolittle
- 1971 Times ● People ● Places
- 1972 Alphabet Soup
- 1973 Little Nemo in Slumberland
- 1974 Childhood Adventures
- 1975 Festivals of Louisiana
- 1976 America on the Water
- 1977 The ALLA Library
- 1978 ALLA's Oriental Adventure
- 1979 Tribute to Jules Verne
- 1980 Once Upon A Time
- 1981 There Were Giants in the Earth in Those Days
- 1982 50 Years of ALLA 1932-1982
- 1983 ALLA in Movieland
- 1984 Louisiana Jambalaya
- 1985 Beauty and the Beast
- 1986 In The Beginning
- 1987 We The People
- 1988 ALLA's Cartoon and Comic Festival
- 1989 The Greatest Show on Earth
- 1990 Don't Touch That Dial
- 1991 ALLA's Aquatic Adventure
- 1992 ALLA 60 Years Young
- 1993 Love Makes the World Go Round
- 1994 Lasting Legends
- 1995 ALLA's Sounds of Music
- 1996 ALLA's Aquatic Adventure
- 1997 A Moment in Time
- 1998 Doing New Orleans
- 1999 Tales of King Arthur
- 2000 It's All Greek to Me
- 2001 Classic Civilizations
- 2002 ALLA's in Wonderland
- 2003 ALLA Salutes the Jazz Walk of Fame
- 2004 ALLA's Masquerade
- 2005 ALLA's Travels Through Middle Earth
- 2006 ALLA's Monster Bash
- 2007 Golden Gryphon Society 75th Anniversary
- 2008 ALLA's Out of This World
- 2009 ALLA Tells Tall Tales
- 2010 ALLA Celebrates Louisiana Sports
- 2011 ALLA's Superfriends
- 2012 ALLA's Astrological Odyssey
- 2013 ALLA Takes Flight
- 2014 ALLA Goes to NOLA
- 2015 Land of the Free & Home of the Brave
- 2016 Salute to American Icons
- 2017 Through the Eyes of a Child
- 2018 ALLA Ask'd For You
- 2019 Are We There Yet?
- 2020 Friday Night Flicks and Fun!
- 2021 No Parade Due to COVID-19
- 2022 ALLA Dives Deep
- 2023 Festing Around the World
- 2024 ALLA's Mythical Menagerie
- 2025 Only A Matter Of Time
- 2026 Shoots for the Stars!

=== Royal court ===
Krewe of Alla annually present a royal court which includes a king and queen named the Maharajah and the Maharanee.

=== Throws ===
Trinkets, collectables, masks, and beads tossed by hand from riders of the floats are called throws. Collectible throws from Krewe of ALLA include custom beads, doubloons, footballs, frisbees, and foam swords.

Krewe of ALLA is known for their hand decorated genie lamps, their signature throw.
