= Intergalactic Krewe of Chewbacchus =

Mardi Gras krewe

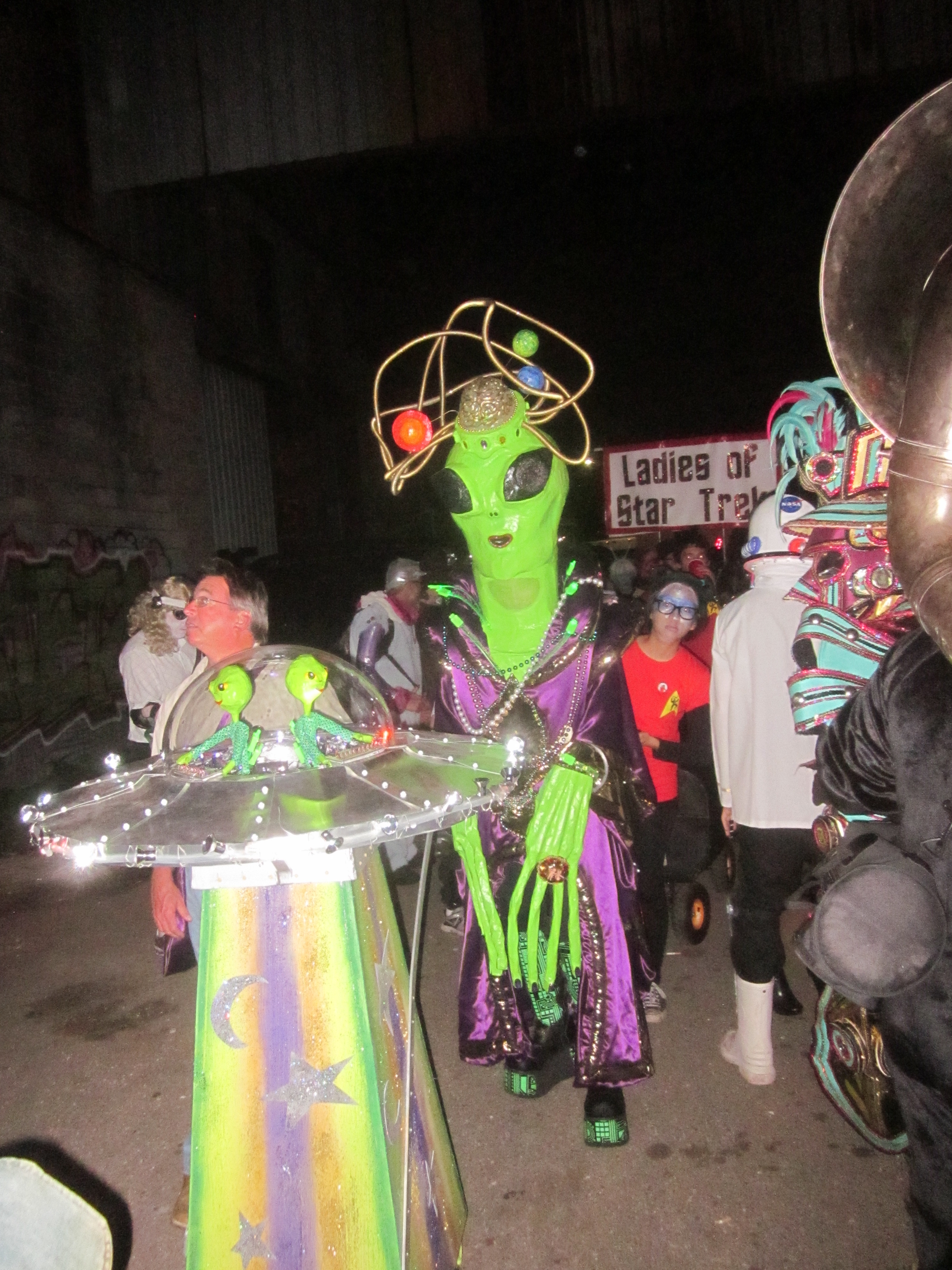
Costumes at the 2013 Chewbacchus parade

The Intergalactic Krewe of Chewbacchus is a science fiction–themed Mardi Gras krewe, religious and parade organization, that also features fantasy and horror groups, among other fandoms. Based in New Orleans, Louisiana, as of the 2019 parade, the Intergalactic Krewe of Chewbacchus has over 2500 dues-paying members who call themselves "ChewbacchanALIENs" or "Chewbs."

It describes its mission as "to save the galaxy by bringing the magical revelry of Mardi Gras to the poor, disenfranchised, socially awkward and generally weird masses who may have never had the opportunity to participate in a Mardi Gras Parade Organization," and aims to "elevate all aspects of Fandom and celebrate Carnival in our own unique way." In short, "saving the galaxy, one drunken nerd at a time!"

== History ==
The group was founded by Ryan S Ballard and Kirah Haubrich in the fall of 2010 when the two were at The Saturn Bar. They were soon joined by local attorney Brett Powers, and together they comprise the original three "Overlords" of the Krewe. Chewbacchus marched for the first time during Mardi Gras 2011 near the Uptown parade route on "Bacchus" Sunday as a satiric mashup of Bacchus, the Roman god of wine, and Chewbacca, the Wookiee from Star Wars.

=== Parade themes and royalty ===
Mardi Gras krewes select a new theme for their parades each year and a new king and/or queen to reign over them. Chewbacchus often selects people from the entertainment industry and creates playful titles for its royalty, as listed below.

- 2011 Theme: BacchnALIEN Invasion. Queen Cynthia Scott (actress from the movie Aliens) and Emperor for Life Peter Mayhew (actor who played the character of Chewbacca in Star Wars). Because Peter Mayhew could not attend, the krewe nominated Lil Doogie (a locally notorious foul-mouthed comedic puppet rapper) as the "Ad Hoc Puppet Government".
- 2012 Theme: Chewbaccalypse. King Giorgio Tsoukalos (consulting producer of the History Channel's Ancient Aliens series) was crowned "Lord of the Chewbaccalypse".
- 2013 Theme: Return of the Wookiee. King Peter Mayhew, also Emperor for Life, finally rode with the krewe in a "Cosmic Triumph" for Chewbacchus. His wife, Angie, served as Royal Consort. They rode in an oversized Wookiee Throne on top of a spectacularly detailed Millennium Falcon contraption.
- 2014 Theme: Wrath of Khan-ival. King Chester Simmons was selected randomly from among the Chewbacchus parade escorts, hard-working volunteers who help clear the path for the parade and provide assistance to participants. In order to select its King or Queen, at the volunteer orientation immediately before the parade, the krewe provided volunteers with king cake and replaced the traditional baby in the cake with a Wookiee. King Chester Simmons happened to get the slice with the Wookiee.
- 2015 Theme: Cult of the Sacred Drunken Wookiee. King/"Pope" Andy Richter (sidekick from Conan O'Brien's late-night show), Emperor for Life Peter Mayhew, and Queen/Royal Consort Angie Mayhew.
- 2016 Theme: Chewluminati: Nerd World Order. Supreme Lizard King of the Chewluminati Keith Green, who won a contest called Mystery of the Chewluminati, a conceptual scavenger hunt.
- 2017 Theme: The Revel Alliance. The Krewe welcomed Ross Marquand (best known for playing Aaron on AMC's hit series The Walking Dead) as the King of the Revel Alliance.
- 2018 Theme: Get On Board the Mothership. The Krewe honored their outgoing original Overlords as royalty: Ryan Ballard, Brett Powers, and Kirah Haubrich.
- 2019 Theme: Space Farce. Brian O'Halloran ruled as King Brian the First, Commander of the Space Farce, He Who Is Not Supposed to Be Here Today.
- 2020 Theme: The Roar of the Wookiee. Royalty were chosen in a Willy Wonka-meets-X Files competition in which fortunate spectators from the 2019 parade were given special "pocket shrines" with instructions for the first step of the contest. Forty-two (42) of these shrines were handed out, in honor of the Krewe's sacred number.
- 2021 Theme: Don't Panic! The Hitchhiker's Guide to the "New Reality".
- 2022 Theme: System Reset.
- 2023 Theme: Let the Wookiee Win.
- 2024 Theme: Nothing To See Here.
- 2025 Theme: Rise of the Superb Owl.

=== Floats and throws ===
Mardi Gras krewes often ride on trailers, vehicles, or floats, but Chewbacchus is a walking krewe, with a "contraptions" only policy. Contraptions are pushed (human-powered) rather than pulled by truck or tractor, and they do not have riders. This provides a safer experience for members and also allows contraptions to roll down narrower streets. All of the Krewe's parade contraptions make an effort to be environmentally friendly, made with recycled materials. These contraptions are pushed, pedaled, or pulled on frames of bicycles, homemade trailers, and shopping carts.

Unlike traditional throws that produce plastic waste, Chewbacchus actively discourages packaging and requires all members to dispose of their trash responsibly on parade night. Chewbacchus is also known for handmade throws created by individual members. These items are sought-after by parade attendees and can feature the mother krewe's annual theme, a subkrewe annual theme, or a subkrewe in general.

== Issues and parades ==
The Intergalactic Krewe of Chewbacchus is remarkable for its rapid pace of growth and popularity among local New Orleanians, gaining momentum from a small core group in its first few weeks to over 300 dues-paying members in its first year. Membership grew to 400 members in 2012. Over 500 dues-paying members marched in the 2013 parade and estimates place audience attendance at approximately 20,000 people. By 2016, membership reached over 1200 ChewbacchanALIENs, and in 2018, they had over 2600 dues-paying members.

One of the reasons for the rapid growth of Chewbacchus is the open nature of the parade—anyone can join for a relatively small fee, as compared to other krewes that can be invitation-only. Chewbacchus calls their pageant "downtown" or "downriver" parade, named because its route is down the river from the "Uptown" St. Charles Avenue route.

Parades and revelry below Elysian Fields began in the 1800s as a primarily Creole tradition. These celebrations were despised by the Americans uptown who did not celebrate carnival at all.

Chewbacchus continues to parade in this area today among several other Krewes who have long been a staple of carnival. They, like other Krewes, are open to a wider membership than traditional uptown krewes. Their membership is fairly young, on average, and their parades are satirical, featuring parody and pastiche.

=== Hoaxes ===
The Intergalactic Krewe of Chewbacchus is responsible for some notable hoaxes and publicity stunts and has been praised for its clever pranks. It kicked off its 2012 season with a guerrilla marketing campaign centered on an elaborate Bigfoot hoax by a fake organization, the New Orleans Bigfoot Society (N.O.B.S.), that claimed that Sasquatch lurked in New Orleans City Park. After generating controversy among both the media and the Bigfoot research community, the creature was eventually revealed to be a "Drunken Wookiee". During the summer of 2012 the Intergalactic Krewe of Chewbacchus expanded its fan base beyond Science Fiction to include Fantasy and Horror and announced it with a publicity stunt by organizing a fake protest by the "Mystik Krewe of P.U.E.W.C. (People for the inclusion of Unicorns, Elves, and Winebots in Chewbacchus)" at its second annual Alien Beach Party at Tipitina's. In late November 2012, the krewe was responsible for a prank website that quickly drew the ire of NASA by announcing that the Curiosity rover had located Mardi Gras beads on Mars and that the famous Martian "face" was in fact a Wookiee temple. As a gesture of goodwill the Overlords of Chewbacchus offered the entire Mars Rover team free memberships in the Krewe.

== See also ==
- Jediism
