= Krewe of Okeanos =

New Orleans Mardi Gras krewe

- Abbreviation: KoO
- Named after: Okeanos
- Formation: 1949; 77 years ago
- Type: Carnival Krewe
- Location: New Orleans, LA.
- Website: kreweofokeanos.org

Krewe of Okeanos is a New Orleans Mardi Gras krewe.

== Parade ==
=== History ===
The Krewe of Okeanos is a New Orleans Mardi Gras parading Krewe organized in 1949 by civic-minded business leaders who were eager to bring a Carnival parade to St. Claude Avenue, their neighborhood’s main street. The club is named for the Greek god of oceans and fertile valleys and is sponsored by the Sonaeko (Okeanos spelled backwards) Club. Okeanos presented its first ball and parade in 1950. The original parade route has changed, we now roll on the extended Uptown Route. In place of the traditional ball masque, the club presents an elegant Coronation Ball at which its King is presented, and his Queen is selected by random draw during the Ball..

=== Parade themes ===
- 1950 Tales From Mother Goose
- 1951 The Land of Enchantment
- 1952 Famous Lovers In Operas
- 1953 Arabian Nights
- 1954 The Wonders Of Oz
- 1955 Famous Broadway Musicals
- 1956 Evil Men Of History
- 1957 Festivals Of Pan-American Countries
- 1958 Great Literary Classics
- 1959 Literary Fantasies
- 1960 The Golden Era Of Gods
- 1961 Thru The World’s Kaleidoscope
- 1962 Great Conquerors Of The Ages
- 1963 Strike Up The Band
- 1964 History Of Man
- 1965 Fairy Tales
- 1966 World’s Great Festivals
- 1967 Songs Of Famous Rivers
- 1968 World’s Great Wonders
- 1969 Twice Told Tales
- 1970 Show Business
- 1971 Famous Operas And Operettas
- 1972 Great Conquerors Of History
- 1973 New Orleans, This Is Your Life
- 1974 Tales Of Enchantment
- 1975 World’s Immortal Music
- 1976 Our American Heritage
- 1977 Man's Culture And Customs
- 1978 Tell Me A Story
- 1979 Salute To Walt Disney
- 1980 Okeanos' World Of Music
- 1981 The Realm Of Fact And Fiction
- 1982 Exciting Events Of Childhood
- 1983 People, Places, Things Remembered
- 1984 Happy Times - Happy Tales
- 1985 Let Okeanos Entertain You
- 1986 Paging Through Pirate History
- 1987 A Tribute To The Arts
- 1988 A Tribute To The Gods
- 1989 Remembering Places Of Interest
- 1990 Magnificent Movies
- 1991 Recollection of Okeanos' Past
- 1992 Naturally New Orleans
- 1993 That’s What I Like About The South
- 1994 New Orleans Music
- 1995 Louisiana Celebrates
- 1996 Bon Voyage
- 1997 Favorite Movies
- 1998 Adventures In Paradise
- 1999 Go For The Gold
- 2000 Ladies, Gents, Children of All Ages
- 2001 Timeless Tales of Childhood
- 2002 Okeanos Goes to the Theater
- 2003 Big Easy on the Move
- 2004 Heroes and Villains
- 2005 Events From the Past
- 2006 And It's All Here
- 2007 Children's Stories
- 2008 Back to the Future
- 2009 Laissez les bon Temps Rouler
- 2010 Will You Be Mine?
- 2011 Children's Fantasies
- 2012 Gone by not Forgotten
- 2013 Okeanos Getaways
- 2014 Okeanos Celebrates the Holidays
- 2015 Okeanos Parades the Kings
- 2016 Okeanos puts on a Fright
- 2017 Okeanos Salutes American Icons
- 2018 Travel With Okeanos
- 2019 Okeanos Celebrates 70
- 2020 Okeanos Honors the Gods
- 2021 -- All Parades & Balls Cancelled Due to COVID-19 Pandemic --
- 2022 Love Stories
- 2023 Festivals of the World
- 2024 Okeanos Celebrates 75
- 2025 Great American Road Trip
- 2026 I Wish

=== Throws ===
Trinkets, collectables, doubloons, and beads tossed by hand from riders of the floats are throws. Collectible throws from Krewe of Okeanos include custom cups, 10-gauge multi-colored doubloons, frisbees, crawfish trays, sand pails, glass beads, and cufflinks.

=== Royal court ===
During the krewe's annual Coronation Ball, the parade’s King is introduced to the membership and his Queen is determined by kismet from the Court’s Maids.
