= Caliphs of Cairo (krewe) =

The Caliphs of Cairo (founded in 1937) are a New Orleans, Louisiana Carnival krewe.

== Annual presentation ==
The Caliphs of Cairo do not parade, but they do hold an annual ball in which the season's debutantes are presented as maids and as queen of the court. This is typically held on a Saturday evening a little more than four weeks prior to Mardi Gras. It is one of the first balls of the Carnival season. Members are masked for the ball and the king's identity is kept a secret.
