= Krewe of King Arthur =

New Orleans Mardi Gras krewe

- Abbreviation: KA
- Named after: King Arthur
- Formation: 1977; 49 years ago
- Founder: Philip Fricano, Jr.
- Type: Coed Carnival Krewe
- Location: New Orleans, LA.
- Members: 2,400
- Website: kreweofkingarthur.com

Krewe of King Arthur is a coed New Orleans Mardi Gras krewe.

== History and formation ==
The Krewe of King Arthur was formed in 1977 by the youngest Carnival captain in history, Philip Fricano, Jr. It was the first Westbank men's organization to parade at night in 1979.

In 2001, King Arthur moved its parade from the Westbank to the current Uptown New Orleans route.

In 2022, King Arthur made history with its largest membership ever, at over 2,400 riders. According to Mardi Gras Guide, it is the third largest krewe in New Orleans and the largest Krewe on the first weekend of Mardi Gras

== Parade ==
=== Parade themes ===
- 2026 Cooking Across America
- 2025 Carnival Gods of the Past 50 Years
- 2024 King Arthur Breaks A Leg on Broadway
- 2023 Are you smarter than a Knight grader?
- 2022 On the Road Again
- 2021 Looking in A RearView Mirror
- 2020 20 Years in Downtown New Orleans
- 2019 And the Arthur Goes To...
- 2018 New Orleans - Beginning to Present
- 2017 Right Back Where We Started
- 2016 King Arthur's Classified Information
- 2015 It's in the Mail
- 2014 King Arthur has the Blues
- 2013 King Arthur Colors his Kingdom
- 2012 40th Anniversary "Right Back Where We Started" Tribute to Monty Python and the Holy Grail
- 2011 Floating Down the Nile
- 2010 What A Long Strange Trip it’s Been
- 2009 "MedEVIL Times Enquirer"
- 2008 New Orleans Loves a Parade
- 2007 King Arthur Celebrates 30 Years
- 2006 Katrina Blows You Away
- 2005 Arthur's Ancient Atlas
- 2004 The Unforgettable Nursery Rhymes of Mother Goose
- 2003 Louisiana Purchase Bicentennial
- 2002 King Arthur’s 25th Anniversary, Silver Memories of Purple, Green, and Gold
- 2001 Toto, I have a Feeling We are not on the Westbank Anymore, We Must be Over the River
- 2000 Ball - Millennial Milestones
- 1999 And You Thought We Were Dead
- 1998 Ball - Gifts to Guinevere
- 1997 Dreaming - - Twenty Years of King Arthur
- 1996 Make Mine Manhattan
- 1995 Somewhere Over the Rainbow
- 1994 Ports of Paradise, Of Fact and Fiction
- 1993 A Evening for Lovers
- 1992 King Arthur Turns 15 and That's Music To My Ears
- 1991 Heaven and Earth . . . And A Little Bit of Hell
- 1990 Arthur's Avenue of Historical Adventures
- 1989 Naturally New Orleans
- 1988 King Arthur’s Royal Pastimes
- 1987 King Arthur’s 10th Year Reunion
- 1986 A Night in Arthur's Enchanted Forest
- 1985 Journey into A Foreign Land
- 1984 Merlin’s Festivals of Entertainment
- 1983 Halls of Memories - A Tribute to Loyola University
- 1982 Tour America on the 4th St. Express
- 1981 Western World Adventures
- 1980 Saturday Morning Matinee
- 1979 King Arthur’s Command Performance
- 1978 It’s A Graduates Dream

=== Royal court ===
The Krewe of King Arthur presents a King Arthur and Queen Guinevere annually.It also includes Merlin the Magician, Morganna Ley Fay,Sir Percival, Sir Lancelot,and Sir Dagonet

=== Throws ===
Trinkets, collectables, masks, and beads tossed by hand from riders of the floats are called throws. Throws from Krewe of King Arthur include wizard hats, puzzles, plush footballs, frisbees, headbands, stuffed animals, and selfie sticks.

Krewe of King Arthur is known for its signature hand-decorated grails. It also gives away the Grail of Grails, a one-off, specially commissioned decorated chalice, described by The Advocate as "possibly the most collectable of all throws."
