= Star Wars religion =

Star Wars religion may refer to:

- Jediism
- Philosophy and religion in Star Wars
