= Mystic Krewe of Nyx =

New Orleans Krewe organization

- Named after: Nyx
- Formation: 2011; 15 years ago
- Type: All Female Krewe
- Location: New Orleans
- Website: www.kreweofnyx.org

The Mystic Krewe of Nyx was an all-female Krewe organization, based in New Orleans. Organized and founded by Julie Lea in 2011, the Nyx's first pageant, "NOLA Reality Reigns," was featured on the St. Charles Avenue Parade Route on February 15, 2012. The Mystic Krewe of Nyx is named after the Greek goddess of the night, Nyx (/ˈnɪks/).

== History and formation ==
After Mardi Gras in 2011, founder and captain Julie Lea had an idea to start her own all-female Mardi Gras Krewe. On March 30, 2011, the Mystic Krewe of Nyx was incorporated with the State of Louisiana. She wanted the Krewe to parade for the 2012 season. The new Krewe had momentum, but they were running out of time as the City of New Orleans still had not approved their parade permit request as of October 1, 2011. However, a vote took place within the New Orleans City Council just in time.

On October 20, 2011, the New Orleans City Council voted 7–0 in favor of putting forth a motion (M-11-495 #78) for the all-female Krewe of Nyx to Parade in 2012. One of the 'motions or resolutions not on the agenda', Resolution R11-498, was presented by Councilmembers Cynthia Hedge-Morrell, Eric Granderson, and Kristen Gisleson Palmer 'supporting the application of the Krewe of Nyx to roll in the 2012 Mardi Gras season and intending to add them to the parade schedule.'

On November 3, 2011, the New Orleans City Council unanimously voted to allow the Mystic Krewe of Nyx to parade in New Orleans in 2012. (#41-CAL. No. 28,734). This was the first new Mardi Gras Krewe created in over a decade.

In less than three months upon receiving the City Council's approval, the Mystic Krewe of Nyx paraded on the streets of New Orleans for the first time on February 15, 2012, with 534 riders.

In June 2020, krewe co-founder and captain Julie Lea used the phrase “All Lives Matter” in social media posts on behalf of the krewe and herself. The comments prompted anger and protest from krewe members. Lea later apologized, stating that she was unaware of the phrase's implications. The 49 riding members of the krewe's Float 21 resigned in protest and called for Lea's resignation.

In 2020 the krewe drew criticism for "liking" a comment on one of its posts that disdained the Black Lives Matter movement and advocated “white power”. Julie Lea attributed the action to an "apprentice" and apologized.

On May 19, 2024 the New Orleans City Council voted unanimously to remove Nyx from the 2025 parade schedule. This action will prevent the krewe from receiving a permit to parade during the 2 weeks of Carnival. The action came after it was determined that the krewe had violated the City Ordinance by not having enough marching bands and having throws that had a card with a QR code advertising for membership.

== Goddess Nyx ==
- 2012 Goddess Nyx I : Ms. Gigi Saak - Grand Marshal: Mrs. Karen Swensen - Parade Theme: "NOLA Reality Reigns"
- 2013 Goddess Nyx II : Ms. Lauren Thom - Grand Marshal: Mrs. Laura Buchtel - Parade Theme: "What a Girl Wants"
- 2014 Goddess Nyx III: Ms. Heather Hanlon Nichols - Grand Marshal: Mrs. Susan Spicer - Parade Theme: "Cookin' with the Krewe"
- 2015 Goddess Nyx IV: Mrs. Jenna Frazier - Grand Marshal: The Dixie Cups - Parade Theme: "Nyx Celebrates The King"
- 2016 Goddess Nyx V: Mrs. Lori Seuzeneau - Grand Marshal: Mrs. Paggy Lee - Parade Theme: "Nyx Turns 5"
- 2017 Goddess Nyx VI: Mrs. Zenia Williams - Grand Marshal: Mrs Irma Thomas - Parade Theme: "Dancing The Night Away"
- 2018 Goddess Nyx VII: Mrs Karen Boudrie Greig - Grand Marshal: Amanda Shaw - Parade Theme: "NOLA's Triple Crown"
- 2019 Goddess Nyx VIII: Miss Shelby Seuzeneau - Grand Marshal: Angela Hill - Parade Theme: “There's no Bigger “P”arty than a “P”arade”
- 2020 Goddess Nyx IX: Mrs Sandra K. Nix - Grand Marshal: Nancy Parker Boyd - Parade Theme: "Nyx, On Cloud Nyne"
- No parade due to COVID-19 pandemic

== Membership ==
- Signature Throw: Hand decorated purses
- Krewe Colors: Pink & black
- Mission: The Mystic Krewe of Nyx is established to unite women of diverse backgrounds for fun, friendship, and the joy of the Mardi Gras season.

== Parade ==
The Krewe of Nyx parades on the Wednesday night before Fat Tuesday on the traditional Uptown New Orleans parade route down St. Charles Avenue and Canal Street. They parade immediately following the Ancient Druids parade. They start on Jefferson Ave. and Magazine St. and end on Tchoupitoulas and Poydras Street. The Krewe of Nyx floats are designed and provided by PFJ Float Designers. On February 3, 2016, Nyx celebrated its 5th anniversary, and debuted its first signature float, a pink Nyx purse float.

=== Signature Floats ===
- The Pink Nyx Purse

The First signature float introduced in 2016. It holds up to 16 riders. Each Year the Krewe holds a raffle drawing to determine who will be riding on this float. In 2020 the spaces on this float were an additional $250 per rider It rolls directly behind the Captain's Lounge

- The Captain's Lounge Float

In 2019 the Captain's Float, the Nyx Captain's Lounge float made its inaugural appearance. The double decked float holds the Captain and up to 28 riders. The main platform holds the Captain and her attendants. The float features three large LED martini glasses and a 24 cycle light show. The "Nyx Captain's Lounge" portion at the rear of the float features LED fiber optics and a 7-foot rear martini glass with a cycled light show. The float is 38.3 ft long x 11.4 feet wide x 15.7 feet tall.

=== Parade dates ===
Within three months of the City Council's approval, the Mystic Krewe of Nyx paraded on the streets of New Orleans for the first time.

- On Wednesday, February 15, 2012, the Krewe paraded with 534 riders.
- On Wednesday, February 6, 2013, the Krewe paraded with 921 riders.
- On Wednesday, February 25, 2014, the Krewe paraded with 1,222 riders.
- On Wednesday, February 11, 2015, the Krewe paraded with 1,511 riders.
- On Wednesday, February 3, 2016, the Krewe paraded with 2,232 riders, achieving 'Super Krewe' status.
- On Wednesday, February 22, 2017, the Krewe paraded with 2,951 riders as a Super Krewe.
- On Wednesday, February 7, 2018, the Krewe paraded with 3,348 riders being the Biggest of the BIG in Parade Ridership.
- On Wednesday, February 27, 2019, the Krewe paraded with 3,383 riders.
- On Wednesday, February 19, 2020, the Krewe paraded with 3,476 riders.
- On Wednesday, February 23, 2022, the Krewe claimed to parade with approximately 250 riders.

== Notable dates ==
- On November 3, 2011, the New Orleans City Council voted to allow the all-female Mystic Krewe of Nyx to parade in New Orleans in 2012.
- On January 6, 2015, the Mystic Krewe of Nyx was presented with a proclamation from the New Orleans City Council, led by Council member at Large Jason Williams, acknowledging the Krewe as the largest all-female parading Krewe in Mardi Gras history.
- In September 2015 with over 2,200 members, the Mystic Krewe of Nyx becomes the first all-female Super Krewe for Mardi Gras 2015.
- On January 6, 2015, the Mystic Krewe of Nyx was presented with a proclamation from the New Orleans City Council, acknowledging the Krewe as the largest all female parading Krewe in Mardi Gras history.
- In January 2016, Nyx teamed up with Haydel's Bakery. Each King Cake from Haydel's Bakery included a Nyx pink porcelain purse to commemorate Nyx's 5th anniversary and their new status as the first all-female Super Krewe in New Orleans.
- February 20, 2017 The Krewe of NYX unveils the Krewe Crest Plaque at Mardi Gras Fountain. The First to be added since 2001.
- On May 30, 2017, the Louisiana State Legislature passed a bill creating a specialty license plate for the Mystic Krewe of Nyx.
- On November 17, 2018, the Mystic Krewe of Nyx crowned its first legacy Goddess, Miss Shelby Seuzeneau, whose mother Mrs. Lori Seuzeneau reigned as Goddess Nyx V.
- In June 2019, Nancy Parker Boyd of Fox8 News, Accepted to Reign as Nyx Grand Marshall 2020 before her death in an airplane crash in August 2019. The Krewe of Nyx honored their late Grand Marshal with a float and a specialty throw in her honor. Nancy's mother and father viewed the parade at Gallier Hall along with members of the Fox 8 family. Her Husband Glen and her Children Parker, Piper, and Pierce road aboard the float.
- On February 19, 2020, during the Krewe's 9th parade, 58-year-old New Orleans woman Geraldine Carmouche died after tripping while trying to cross over the middle of Float No. 21, a hitched tandem double-decker float themed “Come Away With Me.” The woman was struck and subsequently pinned below the second half of the tandem float. The rest of the parade after Float No. 21 was canceled. This was the first fatal accident involving a float during the Mardi Gras season in New Orleans since 1981.
- On June 1, 2020, the Krewe of Nyx posted to its Instagram story a post saying "#AllLivesMatter" in response to the George Floyd protests. The post generated backlash from members of the public and Krewe members. The post was attributed to the captain, Julie Lea, a former NOPD officer, who subsequently apologized, saying she took "full responsibility for my own lack of knowledge" of the history of the phrase. An open letter was then shared denouncing the captain and calling for her resignation, as well as a protest with as many as 50 people outside the Nyx offices. The Krewe leadership met and up to 27 float lieutenants asked her to step down, but Lea stated she would not. The controversy has led to the resignation from the Krewe of as many as 600 of its members.
- On August 31, 2020, the Krewe Of Nyx opened its membership up and posted it on all social media. On Twitter a comment was made in regards to white power. The official Krewe of Nyx likes the tweet. The only person in charge of the Twitter account is Julie Lea.
- In January 2022, it was reported in Arthur Hardy's Mardi Gras Guide that the current membership is 240. This is over 3200 fewer riders than in 2020.

== Philanthropy ==
In May, 2019 the Krewe of Nyx announced plans to partner with the New Orleans Recreation Department (NORD) to build two inclusive playgrounds. The playgrounds will be located in various areas of the city with the first planned for a location in Mid City along the Lafitte Greenway with an opening in January, 2020. The remaining two will be located in New Orleans East and Algiers thus spreading them across the city. Plans are being made to include equipment that will allow children of all abilities to have a safe place to play.
