= Zulu Social Aid & Pleasure Club =

Fraternal organization in New Orleans

Zulu Social Aid and Pleasure Club

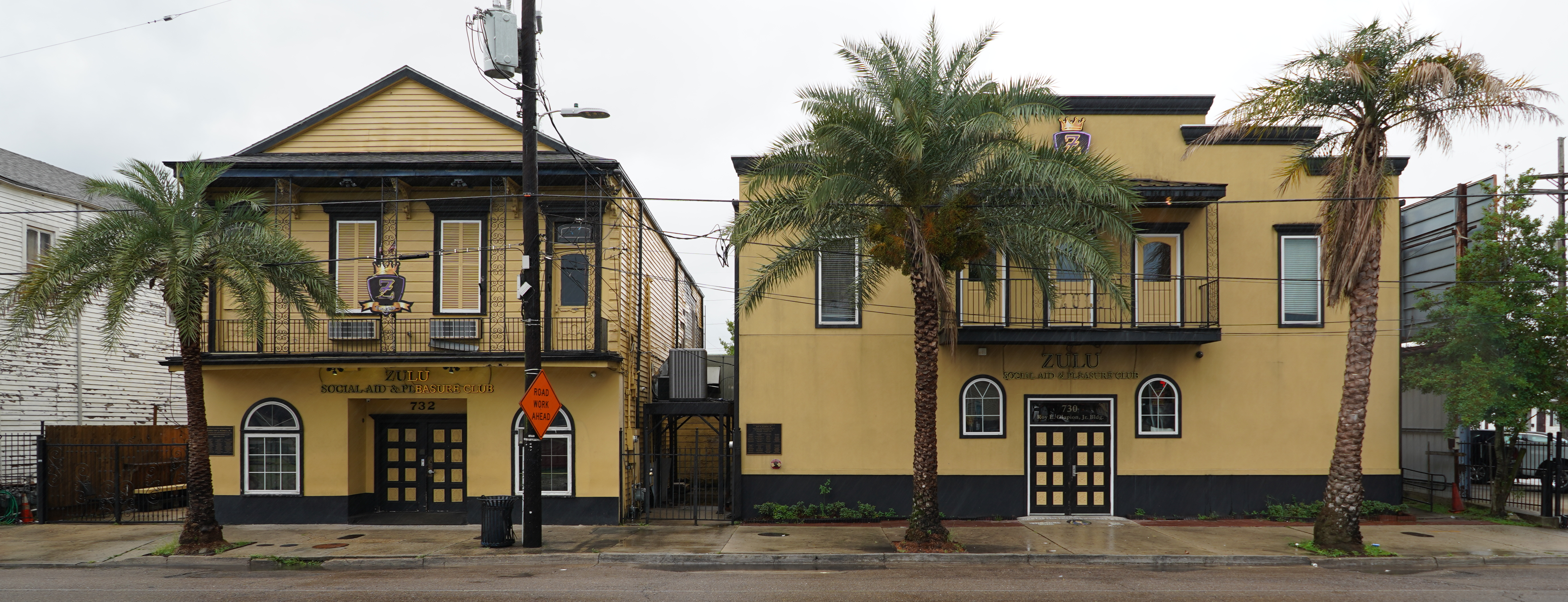
- The Zulu Social Aid & Pleasure Club Headquarters in 2024
- Abbreviation: Zulu S.A.P.
- Formation: 1916; 110 years ago
- Type: Carnival krewe
- Location: New Orleans, Louisiana
- Website: kreweofzulu.com

The Zulu Social Aid & Pleasure Club (founded 1916) is a fraternal organization in New Orleans, Louisiana which puts on the Zulu parade (also known as the Krewe of Zulu) each year on Mardi Gras Day. Zulu is New Orleans' largest predominantly African American carnival organization known for its krewe members wearing grass skirts and its unique throw of hand-painted coconuts. The club is a regular feature of the New Orleans Jazz & Heritage Festival.

The organization has been controversial among the Zulu community on which it is based.

== History ==
In 1908, John L. Metoyer and members of a New York mutual aid society called "The Tramps" attended a vaudevillian comedy show called There Never Was and Never Will Be a King Like Me. The musical comedy performed by the "Smart Set" at the Pythian Temple Theater on the corner of Gravier and Saratoga in New Orleans included a skit where the characters wore grass skirts and dressed in black makeup. Metoyer became inspired by the skit and reorganized his marching troupe from baggy-pant-wearing tramps to a new group called the "Zulus". In 1909, Metoyer and the first Zulu king, William Story, wore a lard-can crown and carried a banana stalk as a scepter. Six years later in 1915, the first decorated platform was constructed with dry goods boxes on a spring wagon. The King's float was decorated with tree moss and palmetto leaves.

In 1916, Zulu Social Aid and Pleasure Club became incorporated where the organization's bylaws were established as well as its social mission and dedication to benevolence and goodwill.

In 1933, the Lady Zulu Auxiliary was formed by the wives of Zulu members, and in 1948 Edwina Robertson became the first Queen of Zulu, making the club the first to feature a queen in a parade.

In the 1960s, membership dwindled as a result of social pressures from civil rights activists. The protesters advertised in the local black community's newspaper The Louisiana Weekly stating:

We, the Negroes of New Orleans, are in the midst of a fight for our rights and for a recognition of our human dignity which underlies those rights. Therefore, we resent and repudiate the Zulu Parade, in which Negroes are paid by white merchants to wander through the city drinking to excess, dressed as uncivilized savages and throwing cocoanuts like monkeys. This caricature does not represent Us. Rather, it represents a warped picture against us. Therefore, we petition all citizens of New Orleans to boycott the Zulu Parade. If we want respect from others, we must first demand it from ourselves.

According to the club, Zulu's use of black makeup was never a form of "blackface". Throughout the south, black Americans were prohibited from wearing masks, but black makeup was permitted. The Zulu Social Aid & Pleasure Club, Inc. says that it has not and never will participate in the act of "blackface," as "blackface" is the derogatory, hateful representation of black people as buffoons and idiots. During the 1960s, the organization, with the support of the Mayor and chief-of-police, gave up black make up but continued the tradition of the parade, wearing grass skirts and keeping the identity of the king secret. Due to continued pressure, by 1965 there were only 15 Zulu members remaining. The induction of local civil rights leaders Ernest J. Wright and Morris F.X. Jeff Sr. as Zulu members eventually lifted tensions and membership started to increase. The krewe soon resumed their old traditions, including the black makeup.

Unlike the other "old-line" Carnival Krewes, Zulu never had a policy of racial discrimination. From its inception, any man, regardless of race, ethnicity or religion, had the opportunity to join the membership. In 1973, Roy E. "Glap" Glapion Jr., Zulu President from 1973 to 1988, started actively recruiting professionals, educators, and prominent businessmen and men from all racial and ethnic backgrounds to join Zulu's membership, making Zulu the first parading organization to actually parade racially integrated.

== Zulu coconut ==
The Zulu Social Aid and Pleasure Club is well known to parade-goers for throwing coconuts to the crowd. In the early 20th century, other parading organizations threw glass necklaces, often hand-made and expensive. The working men of Zulu could not afford similar throws, and decided to purchase coconuts from the French Market since they were unusual and relatively cheap. Painted and adorned coconuts became popular with the club starting in the late 1940s. In 1987, the organization was unable to renew its insurance coverage, and lawsuits stemming from coconut-related injuries forced a halt to the tradition. In 1988 Governor Edwin W. Edwards signed Louisiana State Bill #SB188, the "Coconut Bill", into law, removing liability from injuries resulting from coconuts and enabling the tradition to resume.

== King of Zulu ==
Zulu is the only New Orleans Mardi Gras krewe that selects their king through an election voting process. Potential kings must campaign for the job, including throwing parties for other krewe members to solicit votes.

=== Kings of Zulu ===
- 1909 – William Story
- 1910 – William J. Crawford
- 1911 – Alex Washington
- 1912 – Peter Williams
- 1913 – James Bolton
- 1914 – Henry Harris
- 1915 – John White
- 1916 – John White
- 1917 – James Robertson
- 1918–1919 – WAR
- 1920 – Freddie Brown
- 1921 – James Robertson
- 1922 – Herbert Permillion
- 1923 – Joseph Kahoe
- 1924 – Adrian Hippolite
- 1925 – Baley Robertson
- 1926 – Joseph L. Smith
- 1927 – Arnold L. Moss
- 1928 – Henry Hicks
- 1929 – Wurry Watson
- 1930 – Paul Johnson
- 1931 – Allen Leon
- 1932 – Alonzo Butler
- 1933 – Allen Leon
- 1934 – Leopold LeBlanc
- 1935 – Baptiste Giles
- 1936 – Edmond Hewlett
- 1937 – Arthur Royal
- 1938 – Leopold LeBlanc
- 1939 – Allen James
- 1940 – Emmanuel Bernard
- 1941 – Alonzo Butler
- 1942–1945 – WAR
- 1946 – Clen Vandage
- 1947 – Joseph Warrington
- 1948 – James Smith
- 1949 – Louis "Satchmo" Armstrong
- 1950 – William Poole
- 1951 – Roland Brown
- 1959 – Melvin Green
- 1960 – Baptiste Giles
- 1961 – Henry Johnson
- 1962 – Melvin Green
- 1963 – William Poole
- 1964 – Edward Johnson
- 1965 – Milton Bienamee
- 1966 – Alfred "Al" Barnes
- 1967 – Milton Bienamee
- 1968 – William "Honey" Boykins
- 1969 – Elizah J. Peters
- 1970 – Milton Bienamee
- 1971 – Henry "Bo" Berry
- 1972 – Arthur "Sonny Boy" Carter
- 1973 – Steve "Bulldog Buddy" Johnson
- 1974 – Morris FX Jeff
- 1975 – Harold Doley
- 1976 – Dr. Lawler P. Daniels Jr.
- 1977 – A.J. "Chuck" Mercadel
- 1978 – Willie L. Papin
- 1979 – Joseph O. Misshore, Jr.
- 1980 – Elliot Boisdore
- 1981 – John Elliot Adams
- 1982 – Charles L. Givens
- 1983 – Jesse J. Balancier
- 1984 – Alfred H. Gordon
- 1985 – Eddie R. Carter
- 1986 – Louis Augustin
- 1987 – Fred Thomas
- 1988 – Arthur Vigne
- 1989 – Owens "OJ" Haynes
- 1990 – Keith E. Weatherspoon
- 1991 – Charles E. Hamilton, Jr.
- 1992 – James "Jim" Russell
- 1993 – Oscar Piper
- 1994 – David Belfield
- 1995 – Straughter Prophet
- 1996 – Louis R. Rainey, Jr.
- 1998 – Wallace Broussard
- 1999 – Dr. Myron Moorehead
- 2000 – Roy E. Glapion, Jr.
- 2001 – Melvin A. Armour
- 2002 – Louis "Tony" Williams
- 2003 – Gary A. Thornton
- 2004 – Gerard M. Johnson
- 2005 – Isaac "Ike" Wheeler
- 2006 – no elections due to Hurricane Katrina
- 2007 – Larry A. Hammond
- 2008 – Frank Boutte'
- 2009 – Tyrone Anthony Mathieu, Sr.
- 2010 – Jimmie L. Felder
- 2011 – Anthony "Tony" Barker, Sr.
- 2012 – Elroy Anthony James
- 2013 – Cedric George Givens
- 2014 – Garren Mims
- 2015 – Andrew "Pete" Sanchez, Jr.
- 2016 – Jay H. Banks
- 2017 – Adonis Expose
- 2018 – Brent D. Washington, Sr.
- 2019 – George V. Rainey
- 2020 – Brian M. Sims
- 2021 – cancelled due to COVID-19
- 2022 – Randolph "Rudy" Davis
- 2023 – Nick Spears
- 2024 – Melvin Labat
- 2025 - Rodney Paul Mason Jr.
- 2026 - Dr. Ron Tassin

== Queen of Zulu ==
In 1948 Edwina Robertson became the first Queen of Zulu, making the club the first to feature a queen in a parade. It is a tradition for the club to make a show of meeting the Zulu queen at the airport, but most years' Zulu queens live in New Orleans and therefore have to travel elsewhere so that they can make the flight into the airport for the ceremony.

== Accusations of racism ==
The Zulu parade is based on South African Zulu culture. The parade has faced accusations of racism and cultural appropriation from South Africans. The parade has been accused of being prejudiced and culturally insensitive, as well as practicing blackface.

== See also ==
- Carnival
- New Orleans Mardi Gras
