= Jediism =

Philosophy mainly based on the Jedi characters in Star Wars media

Jediism (or Jedism; /ˈd͡ʒɛdaɪ.ɪz(ə)m/) is an online community and philosophy, or, controversially, a religion, mainly based on the belief system of the fictional Jedi characters in Star Wars media. Jediism attracted public attention in 2001 when some people recorded their religion as "Jedi" on national censuses, encouraged by an email campaign.

Jediism is inspired by elements of Star Wars, specifically the Jedi religion. Early websites dedicated to articulating a belief system based on the Star Wars films were "The Jedi Religion and regulations" and "Jediism". These websites cited the Jedi code, consisting of 21 maxims, as the starting point for a "real Jedi" belief system. The real-world Jediism movement has no leader or central structure. Jediism, while initially regarded as a tongue-in-cheek joke religion when it emerged in the 2001 email campaign, gained legitimate supporters who now claim it is an actual religion and not merely a Star Wars fan club or spoof.

== Beliefs ==
Although followers of Jediism acknowledge the influence of Star Wars on their religion, by following the moral and spiritual codes demonstrated by the fictional Jedi, they also insist their path is different from that of the fictional characters and that Jediism does not focus on the myth and fiction found in Star Wars. While there is some variation in teaching, the Jedi of the Temple of the Jedi Order follow the "16 teachings" based on the presentation of the fictional Jedi, such as "Jedi are mindful of the negative emotions which lead to the Dark Side" and "Jedi are guardians of peace and justice". Adherents also follow "21 maxims".

== Census phenomenon ==
Jediism received press coverage following a worldwide email campaign in 2001 that urged people to write "Jedi" as their religion in their country's census, resulting in the Jedi census phenomenon. The majority of such respondents are assumed to have claimed the faith as a joke.

== Legal recognition ==
=== United States ===
In 2005, the Temple of the Jedi Order was registered in Texas. It was granted IRS tax exemption in 2015. In May 2005, an article on the growth of the Jedi religion by Catholic author Jon M. Sweeney was the most-read article on the website Explorefaith.org that year.

=== United Kingdom ===
During the drafting of the UK Racial and Religious Hatred Act, an amendment was proposed that excluded Jedi Knights from any protection, along with Satanists and believers in animal sacrifice. The amendment was subsequently withdrawn, the proposer explaining that it was "a bit of a joke" to illustrate a point that defining religious belief in legislation is difficult.

In 2007, 23-year-old Daniel Jones founded the Church of Jediism with his brother Barney, believing that the 2001 UK census recognised Jediism as a religion, and that there were "more Jedi than Scientologists in Britain". In 2009, Jones was removed from a Tesco supermarket in Bangor, North Wales, for refusing to remove his hood on a religious basis. The owner justified Jones's ejection by saying, "He hasn't been banned. Jedis [sic] are very welcome to shop in our stores although we would ask them to remove their hoods. Obi-Wan Kenobi, Yoda and Luke Skywalker all appeared hoodless without ever going over to the Dark Side and we are only aware of the Emperor as one who never removed his hood."

In 2013, the Free Church of Scotland expressed concern that a proposed Marriage and Civil Partnership bill would "lead to Star Wars Jedi marrying couples". Patrick Day-Childs of the Church of Jediism and Rev. Michael Kitchen of Temple of the Jedi Order both defended the right of Jedi to perform marriage ceremonies.

In December 2016, the Charity Commission for England and Wales rejected an application to grant charitable organization status to the Temple of the Jedi Order, ruling that the group did not "promote moral or ethical improvement" for charity law purposes.

=== Turkey ===
In April 2015, students at Dokuz Eylül University in Turkey launched a petition on Change.org demanding that a Jedi temple be built on the campus. The petition was in response to a previous petition which had demanded a mosque on the campus of Istanbul Technical University (İTÜ). The petition demanding the mosque reached 180,000 signatures, falling short of its 200,000 target, and invoked a response from Mehmet Karaca, the rector of İTÜ, promising "a landmark mosque". Soon after, students at other universities began circulating petitions demanding the establishment of Jedi and Buddhist temples on their campuses.

== See also ==
- Intergalactic Krewe of Chewbacchus
- Dudeism
