= Krewe of Cleopatra =

New Orleans Mardi Gras krewe

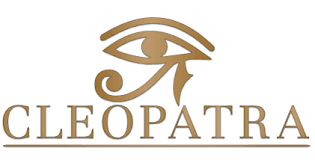
- Formation: 1972; 54 years ago
- Founder: Dolores Kepner
- Type: Carnival Krewe
- Location: New Orleans
- Members: Over 3,200
- Website: kreweofcleopatra.org

The Krewe of Cleopatra is a New Orleans Mardi Gras Super Krewes and social organization.

== History and formation ==
The Krewe of Cleopatra is one of the few Super Krewes with only female members (with over 3,200 members and one of the largest parades participating in the New Orleans Mardi Gras).

The Krewe of Cleopatra was founded in 1972 by Dolores "Tuttie" Kepner, becoming the first Carnival Club for women on the West Bank of the Mississippi River. 1973 was the first year the Krewe paraded with 250 members. The Krewe made its permanent move from the West Bank to the East Bank after the 2013 carnival season.

From 1972 to 1975 Cleopatra was co-captained by two sisters, Dolores Kepner and Joycelyn Champagne. Having appreciated parades their entire lives as natives of New Orleans, the two women decided to work together administrating an all female carnival club. Kepner's husband William Dill put them in touch with his friend and Algiers, New Orleans native, Blaine Kern Sr. of Mardi Gras World, who encouraged them to form the krewe and designed and organized the construction of the krewe's Queen Barge float which was built in Spain and debuted in the 1974 parade, and has appeared in every Krewe Parade since. Once they received the okay from the proper authorities in Gretna and Orleans Parish, The Krewe of Cleopatra was born. The krewe paraded on the West Bank for 39 years, taking one year off after Hurricane Katrina, before making their debut on the Uptown parade route in 2014.

The krewe owns a fleet of floats built by float builder Barry Kern of Kern Studios, including a 3-unit signature float named, “QUEEN TUTT” in honor of the Krewe's founder Dolores "Tuttie" Kepner.

== Membership ==
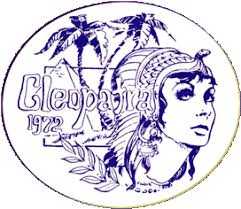

New members complete a form with accompany application fee. Once application is reviewed and approved member submits dues payment. In 2018 membership grew to over 1,000 members. The Krewe of Cleopatra is the first of the super krewes that roll during the New Orleans Mardi Gras Season and is considered a top ten 2019 parade for ridership with over 1,000 riders. In 2022 the Krewe's ridership had grown to over 1,800 members with 27 floats, including 12 tandems. In 2023 the Krewe's ridership grew again to over 2,200 members with 37 floats, including 11 tandems and two triples.

As of 2025, the Krewe has over 3,200 riders and 25 Floats (57 Units), 2 Quads (Four Units), 7 Triples (Three units), 12 Doubles (Two Units), 4 Singles (One Unit).

Krewe of Cleopatra Signature Floats

Captain’s Float

Cleopatra’s Royal Barge

Queen “Tutt” (Four units)

Cleopatra’s Nile… The River of Life (Four Units)

Video Title Float (Two Units)

== Captain ==
Dolores Kepner, captain and founder, was one of the top 5 longest active serving leaders in New Orleans Mardi Gras History. Kepner died on July 2, 2020, at the age of 89, after serving as the Captain of the Krewe for 48 years. The Krewe's current captain is Colleen Johnson.

== Parade ==
The parade features floats and bands from Louisiana and Mississippi, including the bands from Terrebonne High, H. L. Bourgeois High, Copiah Academy, Oaklawn Junior High, East St. John, St. James and Morgan City high schools. The annual celebration begins with a Cleopatra pre-parade and ends with the post-parade, Cleo Jubilee. In between the pre and post-parade events, the parade travels down the Uptown parade route on St. Charles Avenue. Other Krewe of Cleopatra events during the year include a Rendezvous Ball. On December 5, 2025 the Krewe of Cleopatra will host their Rendezvous Ball in the Ceasars Superdome for the first time.

=== Parade themes ===
- 2026 Friday Night is for the Girls
- 2025 Taking Care of Business
- 2024 Cleopatra's Happy Hour
- 2023 Cleopatra’s Jeweled Jubilee
- 2022 Cleopatra’s Greatest Hits!
- 2021 No Parade - COVID-19 pandemic
- 2020 Cleopatra’s Vixens and Valentines
- 2019 Cleopatra's Animated Adventures
- 2018 Cleopatra's Animal Kingdom
- 2017 Cleopatra "Cleo Las Vegas"
- 2016 Cleopatra Rocks the Big Easy!
- 2015 Nightmare on the Avenue
- 2014 Strolling Down the Avenue
- 2013 Dreams of Conquest
- 2012 Cleopatra Tips Her Hat to Mardi Gras
- 2011 Egyptian Treasures
- 2010 Those Famous Words
- 2009 It's Five O'Clock Somewhere
- 2008 Cleopatra's Bits and Pieces of the Past
- 2007 Cleopatra Paints the Town Red
- 2006 No Parade - Hurricane Katrina
- 2005 Girls Just Want to Have Fun
- 2004 I Could Have Danced All Night
- 2003 Cleo Takes a Walk on the Wild Side
- 2002 A World of Pearls
- 2001 Some Enchanted Evening
- 2000 I'll See You in My Dreams
- 1999 It's Only Make Believe
- 1998 Isn't it Romantic
- 1997 Silver Cheers - It's 25 Years
- 1996 A Few of My Favorite Things
- 1995 If I Ruled the World
- 1994 The Many Lives of Cleopatra
- 1993 A World of Fashion
- 1992 Our Precious Moments
- 1991 Way Down Yonder in New Orleans
- 1990 Let Us Entertain You
- 1989 Fantasies in Feathers
- 1988 Oh! You Beautiful Doll
- 1987 Waltzing Down Memory Lane
- 1986 A Pretty Girl is Like a Melody
- 1985 Cleopatra's Sweet Smell of Success
- 1984 Cleopatra Heralds the World's Fair
- 1983 Cleopatra's Journey to the Heavenly Bodies
- 1982 Cleopatra Lights Up Broadway
- 1981 Cleopatra In Camelot
- 1980 Cleopatra's Vanity of Fragrances
- 1979 Circuses of the World Entertain Cleopatra
- 1978 Gardens of Grandeur
- 1977 Great Moments in Grand Opera
- 1976 Feasts, Festivals, and Celebrations in America
- 1975 Dreams of Conquest
- 1974 Gifts to Caesar
- 1973 Cleopatra's Queens and Enchantresses

=== Royal court ===
The Krewe of Cleopatra annually presents a royal court including a "Queen Cleopatra" and the Jewels of the Nile.

- 1973 Queen Cleopatra I, Evelyn Hilderbrand
- 1974 Queen Cleopatra II, Denise Guidry
- 1975 Queen Cleopatra III, Elizabeth Schwarz
- 1976 Queen Cleopatra IV, Vicki O'Brien
- 1977 Queen Cleopatra V, Elizabeth Martin
- 1978 Queen Cleopatra VI, Dottie Daigle
- 1979 Queen Cleopatra VII, Sharon Arnold
- 1980 Queen Cleopatra VIII, Gail Williams
- 1981 Queen Cleopatra IX, Jan Cogan
- 1982 Queen Cleopatra X, Glenda Ledet
- 1983 Queen Cleopatra XI, Lorraine Ott
- 1984 Queen Cleopatra XII, Nicki Fischer
- 1985 Queen Cleopatra XIII, Frances Tingstrom
- 1986 Queen Cleopatra XIV, Eileen Adams
- 1987 Queen Cleopatra XV, Norma Kouri
- 1988 Queen Cleopatra XVI, Norma Glynn
- 1989 Queen Cleopatra XVII, Terri Laird
- 1990 Queen Cleopatra XVIII, Laura Disimone
- 1991 Queen Cleopatra XIX, Pamela Dow
- 1992 Queen Cleopatra XX, Linda Girouard
- 1993 Queen Cleopatra XXI, Constance Rector
- 1994 Queen Cleopatra XXII, Emma Plaisance
- 1995 Queen Cleopatra XXIII, Dolores Buras
- 1996 Queen Cleopatra XXIV, Kim Beniot Cappiello
- 1997 Queen Cleopatra XXV, Terri Rittiner
- 1998 Queen Cleopatra XXVI, Lizette Chinn Christiana
- 1999 Queen Cleopatra XXVII, Jackie Miljak Slyvest
- 2000 Queen Cleopatra XXVIII, Sherry Buras
- 2001 Queen Cleopatra XXIX, Allison Zeller Sturtz
- 2002 Queen Cleopatra XXX, Barbara Duplantis
- 2003 Queen Cleopatra XXXI, Linda Middleton
- 2004 Queen Cleopatra XXXII, Mary Martin
- 2005 Queen Cleopatra XXXIII, Colleen Johnson
- 2007 Queen Cleopatra XXXIV, Jennifer Stansbury
- 2008 Queen Cleopatra XXXV, Danielle Champagne
- 2009 Queen Cleopatra XXXVI, Dana Blondiau
- 2010 Queen Cleopatra XXXVII, Arleen Pizani
- 2011 Queen Cleopatra XXXVIII, Kyla Clement
- 2012 Queen Cleopatra XXXIX, Kimberly Buck
- 2013 Queen Cleopatra XL, Melinda Baldassaro
- 2014 Queen Cleopatra XLI, Alexandra Breland
- 2015 Queen Cleopatra XLII, Suzanne Arceneaux
- 2016 Queen Cleopatra XLIII, Myra Cancienne
- 2017 Queen Cleopatra XLIV, Abigail Breland
- 2018 Queen Cleopatra XLV, Wanda Adam
- 2019 Queen Cleopatra XLVI, Stacy Guidry
- 2020 Queen Cleopatra XLVII, Amanda Roudolfich
- 2021/2022 Queen Cleopatra XLVIII & XLIX, Carrie Simpson
- 2023 Queen Cleopatra L, Victoria Bagot
