= Krewe of Endymion =

New Orleans Mardi Gras organization

- Formation: February 4, 1967; 59 years ago
- Founder: Edmond J. Muniz
- Type: Carnival krewe
- Location: Mid-City, New Orleans, Louisiana
- Members: 3,200
- Budget: $8,000,000
- Website: endymion.org

The Krewe of Endymion is a super krewe and social organization that participates in Mardi Gras in New Orleans.

== History and formation ==
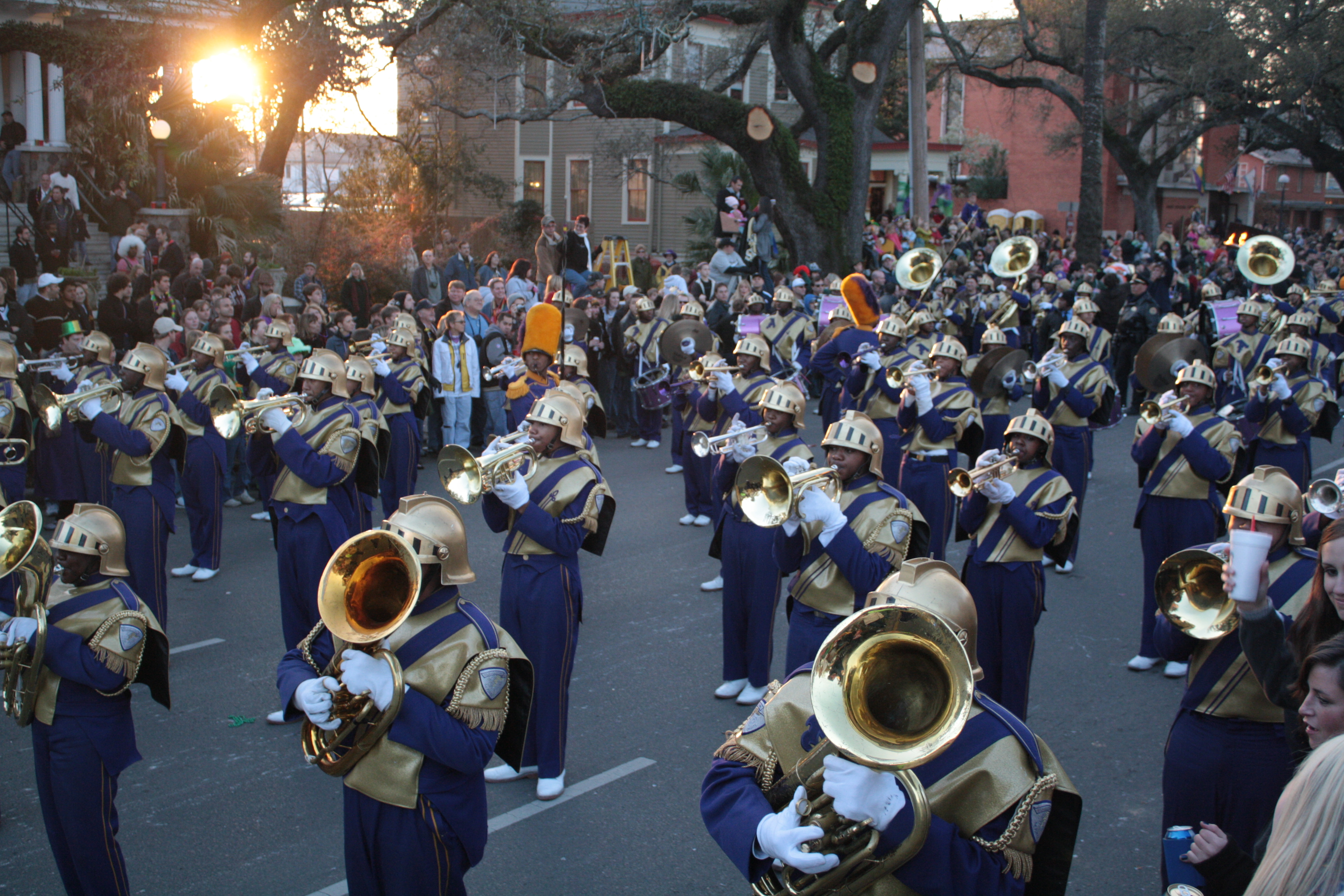
The St. Augustine High School "Marching 100" marching in Endymion.

The Krewe of Endymion is one of only three super krewes (using floats and celebrity grand marshals), and is the largest of the parades participating in the New Orleans Mardi Gras. Many people begin saving their viewing spots for this parade several days before the parade actually rolls, although spot-saving is widely frowned upon and is discouraged. It was founded in 1966 and named after the Endymion of Greek mythology. The first ball was held in 1968.

== Parade ==
The first Endymion parade rolled on February 4, 1967 in the Gentilly neighborhood near the New Orleans Fair Grounds horse racing facility. The parade remained on its original route until 1976, shifting to a Mid-City route in 1982, rolling from Orleans Avenue to North Carrollton Avenue to Canal Street and into the Caesars Superdome.

The 1979 parade was moved to the Jefferson Parish suburb of Kenner due to a strike by the New Orleans Police Department which forced the cancellation of a large number of parades within the city, including fellow super krewe Bacchus and all of the old-line parades, led by Rex, King of Carnival and the Mistick Krewe of Comus.

The 2003 parade was forced to the Uptown route along St. Charles Avenue by construction of the Canal Streetcar Line, a circumstance which repeated in 2006 and 2007 due to a lack of manpower within the NOPD in the wake of Hurricane Katrina. Endymion returned to Mid-City in 2008 and is the only remaining parade in the New Orleans city limits which does not use the Uptown route.

On February 25, 2017, an impaired driver injured between 28 and 32 people when his pickup truck hit two cars and a parade crowd and crashed into a dump truck. Terrorism was quickly ruled out when a breathalyzer test was three times over the legal driving limit.

On March 2, 2019, an impaired driver killed two people and injured seven others when he plowed through a bicycle lane during the parade.

On February 22, 2020, the parade was halted and cancelled after 13 floats, after a spectator was struck and killed between the halves of a tandem float. Following the incident, as well as a similar death during the Nyx parade earlier in the week, the city of New Orleans banned interconnected floats from the remaining Mardi Gras parades that year. Parades were canceled in 2021 due to the COVID-19 pandemic.

=== Celebrity Grand Marshals and Performers ===
New Orleans Saints owner Tom Benson was Grand Marshal of the 2010 parade only six days following his franchise's victory in Super Bowl XLIV over the Indianapolis Colts. Benson was the first celebrity grand marshal not from the entertainment industry.

- 1974: Doc Severinsen
- 1975: Dyan Cannon, Bobby Vinton
- 1976: Alice Cooper, Wolfman Jack, Jerry Vale
- 1977: Gino Vannelli, Penny Marshall, Cindy Williams, Vikki Carr
- 1978: Cheryl Ladd, Wayne Newton, Fats Domino
- 1979: Charo, KC and the Sunshine Band
- 1980: Engelbert Humperdinck
- 1981: Neil Sedaka, Suzanne Somers
- 1982: Captain & Tennille, Kool & the Gang
- 1983: Lou Rawls, Crystal Gayle, Kool & the Gang, Doc Severinsen
- 1984: Tom Jones, Kool & the Gang, Fats Domino, Doc Severinsen
- 1985: Wayne Newton, Fats Domino, Melissa Manchester
- 1986: Paul Anka
- 1987: Kirk Cameron, Jeremy Miller, Tracey Gold
- 1988: Dolly Parton, Heather Locklear, Roy Orbison, Smokey Robinson, Spuds MacKenzie, Miami Sound Machine
- 1989: Fred Savage, Hall & Oates
- 1990: John Goodman, Chicago, Four Tops
- 1991: Michael Bolton
- 1992: Kenny Rogers, Patrick Duffy
- 1993: Steven Seagal, The Beach Boys
- 1994: Stephen Stills, Jeanne Cooper, Corbin Bernsen, Frankie Valli
- 1995: Chuck Norris, Huey Lewis, KC and the Sunshine Band, Richard Karn
- 1996: Kool & the Gang, Jonathan Silverman, Donna Summer
- 1997: David Schwimmer
- 1998: Jerry Springer, Jack Wagner, Ian Ziering, KC and the Sunshine Band
- 1999: Emeril Lagasse
- 2000: Britney Spears
- 2001: Frankie Muniz
- 2002: Jason Alexander
- 2003: Pete Fountain, Aaron Carter
- 2004: LeAnn Rimes
- 2005: Marisa Tomei, Gene Simmons, Hootie & the Blowfish, The Pointer Sisters
- 2006: Dan Aykroyd, James Belushi, Better Than Ezra
- 2007: Taylor Hicks, Journey, Styx, Al Green
- 2008: Kevin Costner, The Go-Go's, The Doobie Brothers
- 2009: Kid Rock, REO Speedwagon
- 2010: Tom Benson, Lynyrd Skynyrd
- 2011: Anderson Cooper, Kelly Ripa, Mark Consuelos, Pat Benatar, Train
- 2012: Maroon 5, Big & Rich,
- 2013: Kelly Clarkson
- 2014: Carrie Underwood, Norman Reedus, Ian Somerhalder
- 2015: Luke Bryan
- 2016: Steven Tyler, Pitbull
- 2017: KC and the Sunshine Band, Kiss, Flo-Rida
- 2018: Rod Stewart, Jason Derulo, Jon Batiste
- 2019: Flo-Rida, Lionel Richie, Chicago (band)
- 2022: Raymond Arroyo
- 2023 Willie Fritz
- 2024 Sting (musician), Flo Rida
- 2025 Katy Perry, Train
- 2026 Gwen Stefani, Blake Shelton

=== Throws ===
Its motto, "Throw Until It Hurts", defines a tradition of being extremely generous with its throws, tossing millions of beads, cups, doubloons and trinkets during its annual parade, held the Saturday before Mardi Gras.

=== Parade Themes ===
- 1967 Take Me Out to the Ball Game
- 1968 Highlights of the Silver Screen
- 1969 Music... and that Reminds Me
- 1970 Kingdoms Revisited
- 1971 New Orleans, American's Most Interesting City
- 1972 Fables and Folklore
- 1973 Golden Reflections
- 1974 Endymion Salutes the Ladies
- 1975 America Celebrates
- 1976 Hail to the Chiefs
- 1977 It’s a Small World
- 1978 The Superstars
- 1979 Endymion, A Thing of Beauty
- 1980 Broadway on Parade
- 1981 Heartbeat of America
- 1982 Literary Treasures
- 1983 Myths and Legends
- 1984 It Was a Very Good Year
- 1985 Come to the Mardi Gras
- 1986 What Might Have Been
- 1987 I'd Rather Be...
- 1988 New Orleans, This is Your Life
- 1989 They Changed the World
- 1990 Saturday Night at the Movies
- 1991 Silver Memories
- 1992 The World’s Greatest Mysteries
- 1993 Flights of Fantasy
- 1994 Endymion’s Rockumentary
- 1995 Creature Features
- 1996 Master Storytellers
- 1997 Les Festivals Internationale
- 1998 Biographies
- 1999 Mardi Gras from the Beginning
- 2000 At Home in the Dome
- 2001 2001: A Space Odyssey - Mankind's Journey into Space
- 2002 Masquerade
- 2003 New Orleans From A to Z
- 2004 Saturday Night at the Movies: The Sequel
- 2005 Endymion’s Mythological Menagerie
- 2006 Legends and Lure of Gold
- 2007 Endangered and Extinct Species
- 2008 Endymion’s Salute to Rudyard Kipling
- 2009 Tales of Sleep and Dreams
- 2010 Abracadabra
- 2011 American Masters
- 2012 Happily Ever After
- 2013 Ancient Mysteries
- 2014 An Evening at the Opera
- 2015 Fantastic Voyages
- 2016 Endymion Through the Years
- 2017 Endymion’s Constellations
- 2018 Jazz - Our Gift to the World
- 2019 Wonder Tales of Science Fiction
- 2020 Endymion’s Historic Dynasties
- 2021 No parade due to COVID-19 pandemic
- 2022 Legends of Fire & Ice
- 2023 Endymion Salutes the Poets
- 2024 Silents Are Golden
- 2025 The Secret Teachings of All Ages
- 2026 American Songbook

== Samedi Gras ==
Samedi Gras is the Endymion pre-parade block party located between Carrollton and City Park Avenue. Samedi Gras begins at noon on parade day. The Captain and riding celebrities arrive early and address the crowds and the Endymion Parade begins shortly after.

== Endymion Extravaganza ==
The parade is immediately followed with a party called the "Endymion Extravaganza". It was held from 1974 to 1980 at the now demolished Rivergate Convention Center. Since 1981, it has been held in the Superdome, except in 2006 when it was held at the New Orleans Morial Convention Center due to repairs to the Superdome after Hurricane Katrina; 2011 due to ongoing renovations; and 2023 and 2024 due to extensive renovations in advance of Super Bowl LIX.
