= Vanessa R. Williams =

American singer (born 1960)

- Born: Vanessa Renee Williams; November 28, 1960 (age 65)
- Origin: Baton Rouge, Louisiana, U.S.
- Genres: Gospel
- Occupation: Singer
- Instrument: Vocals
- Years active: 2002–present
- Labels: Light Records; Bajada Records

Vanessa Renee Williams (born November 28, 1960) is an American gospel music singer.

== Early life ==
Vanessa Renee Williams was born on November 28, 1960 in Baton Rouge, Louisiana.

== Career ==
After working as a public school art teacher for many years, she signed with Light Records and Bajada Records. Her debut album Vanessa was released in 2002 and made the top ten of Billboard magazine's gospel albums chart. Her follow-up album Here I Go Again was released in 2004. She performed for several years with Yolanda Adams and as a member of Richard Smallwood's ensemble Vision.
