= Mardi Gras throws =

Trinkets thrown at Mardi Gras parade spectators

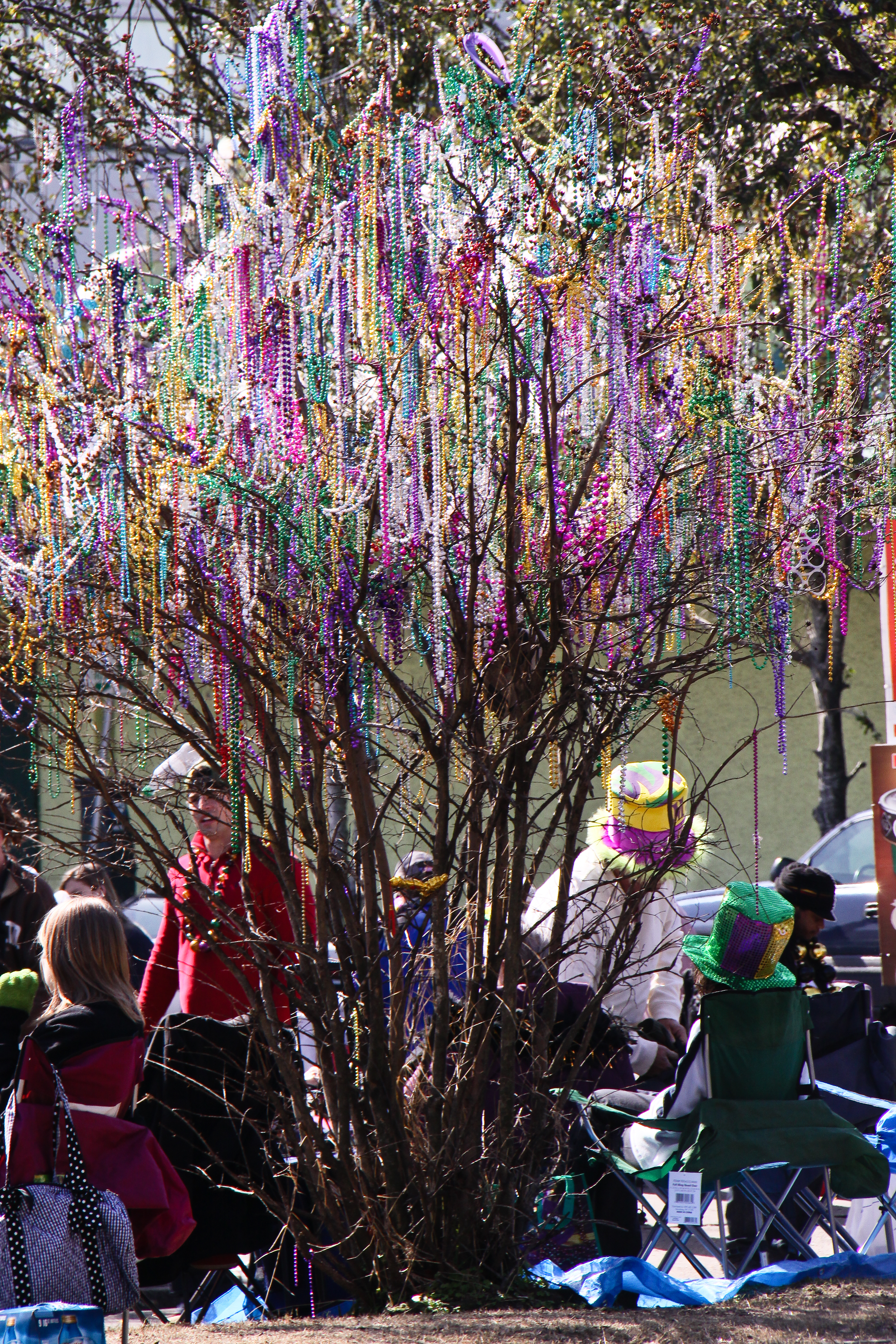
Tree covered with Mardi Gras beads

Mardi Gras throws are strings of beads, doubloons, cups, or other trinkets passed out or thrown from the floats for Mardi Gras celebrations, particularly in New Orleans, Mobile, Alabama, and parades throughout the Gulf Coast of the United States, to spectators lining the streets. The "gaudy plastic jewelry, toys, and other mementos [are] tossed to the crowds from parading floats". The 'throws' consist of necklaces of plastic beads, coins called doubloons, which are stamped with krewes' logos, parade themes and the year, plus an array of plastic cups and toys such as Frisbees, figurines and LED trinkets. The plastic cups that are used as throws are sometimes referred to as New Orleans dinnerware.

Beads used on Mardi Gras (known as Shrove Tuesday in some regions) are purple, green, and gold, with these three colors containing the Christian symbolism of justice, faith, and power, respectively. Traditionally, Mardi Gras beads were manufactured in Japan and Czech Republic, although many are now imported from mainland China. As Fat Tuesday concludes the period of Carnival (Shrovetide), Mardi Gras beads are taken off oneself on the following day, Ash Wednesday, which begins the penitential season of Lent. As such, one of the "solemn practices of Ash Wednesday is to pack all the beads acquired during the parade season into bags and boxes and take them to the attic".

== Origin ==
The tradition of throwing Mardi Gras throws to spectators during the parade started with the second procession of the Twelfth Night Revelers in the early 1870s, with an individual dressed as Santa Claus passing out gifts to spectators as he passed by. The tradition was then expanded and continued by the Krewe of Rex who began to throw glass beads to spectators in the early 20th century.

Spectators have traditionally shouted to the krewe members, "Throw me something, mister!", a phrase that is iconic in New Orleans' Mardi Gras street argot. Some women expose their breasts to invite throws in the French Quarter, although this is not required or even classed as a true Mardi Gras tradition, it is however quite common during French Quarter parades.

Some krewes have specialty throws: for example, the Zulu Social Aid & Pleasure Club hand-painted coconut or the Krewe of Muses hand-decorated glitter shoes.

== Flashing for beads ==
The notion that women could flash to receive beads or other throws is relatively recent. As one of the more recent Mardi Gras traditions, it took hold in the 1970s, with one source pegging it to Fat Tuesday 1976, when some women realized they could exchange glimpses of bare flesh for trinkets from their Royal Street balcony. Already in the early 1980s the practice of women (and men) to flash their chests, rears, and occasionally genitals for throws on Bourbon Street during Mardi Gras was established. Sociology professor Dr. Wesley Shrum calls flashing for beads "ritual disrobement" and considers it a symbol of the free market. Sociology professor Dr. Craig J. Forsyth suggests the practice originated in the gay community. The official Mardi Gras website makes clear flashing is not a requirement for getting throws, and cautions against any indecent exposure, inappropriate or even illegal public nudity.
