= Krewe =

Group of dancers in a carnival parade

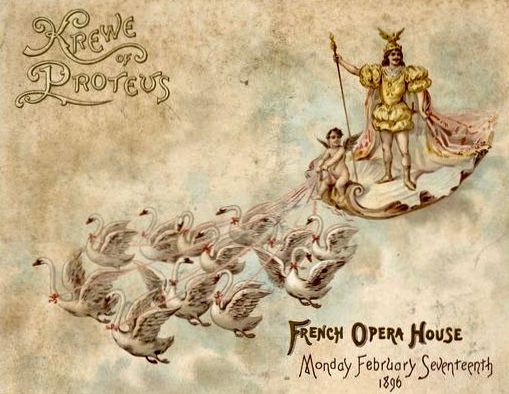
An invitation to the Krewe of Proteus ball, New Orleans, 1896

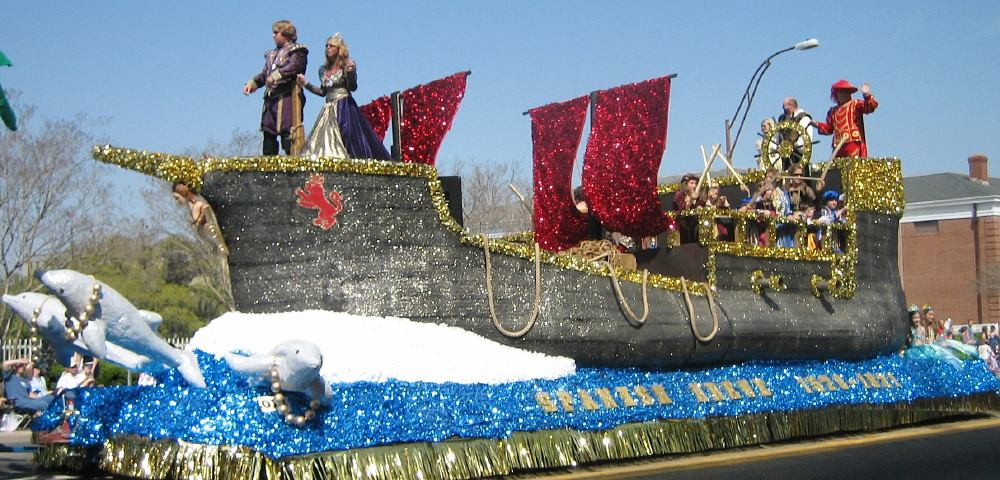
A "Spanish Krewe" float at Springtime Tallahassee

A krewe (/kruː/ KROO) is a social organization that stages parades and balls for the Carnival season. The term is best known for its association with Mardi Gras celebrations in New Orleans, but is also used in other Carnival celebrations throughout Louisiana (e.g., in Lafayette, Shreveport, and Baton Rouge) and along the Gulf of Mexico, such as the Gasparilla Pirate Festival in Tampa, Florida, Springtime Tallahassee, and Krewe of Amalee in DeLand, Florida with the Mardi Gras on Mainstreet Parade as well as in La Crosse, Wisconsin and at the Saint Paul Winter Carnival.

The word is thought to have been coined in the early 19th century by a New Orleans-based organization calling itself Ye Mistick Krewe of Comus, as an archaic affectation; with time, it became the most common term for a New Orleans Carnival organization. The Mistick Krewe of Comus was inspired by the Cowbellion de Rakin Society that dated from 1830, a mystic society that organizes annual parades in Mobile, Alabama.

The krewe system then spread from Mobile and New Orleans to other towns and cities with French Catholic heritage, including those with their own Mardi Gras traditions, such as the Courir de Mardi Gras. Following those of New Orleans, Louisiana's next-oldest krewes are mostly based near Lafayette, which crowned its first Rex-style monarch, King Attakapas, in 1897. The state's oldest extant children's krewe, Oberon, is also based in Lafayette, and was founded in 1928.

== Membership ==
Krewe members are assessed fees in order to pay for the parade or ball. Fees can range from thousands of dollars a year per person for the most elaborate parades, to as little as $20 a year for smaller clubs. Criteria for krewe membership vary similarly, ranging from exclusive organizations largely limited to relatives of previous members, to other organizations open to anyone able to pay the membership fee.

Krewes with low membership fees may also require members to work to help build and decorate the parade floats and make their own costumes. Higher priced krewes hire professionals to do this work. Parading krewe members are usually responsible for buying their own throws such as beads and coins, which are thrown to parade spectators according to tradition.

Some krewes have other events, such as private dances or parties, for members throughout the year. Some also make a point of supporting charities and good causes.

Some krewes restrict their membership to one sex, while others allow co-ed membership. For example, the Krewe of Endymion from New Orleans and Ye Mystic Krewe of Gasparilla from Tampa are restricted to men only. Examples of female-only krewes include the New Orleans' Krewe of Cleopatra and Krewe of Muses and Tampa's Krewe of Venus.

== See also ==
- Carnival society
- Comparsa
- Krew (disambiguation)
- Crew (disambiguation)
- New Years Associations
- Samba school
- Second line (parades)
