= River City Casino =

River City Casino may refer to:

- River City Casino (Lemay), a casino in Lemay, Missouri
- River City Casino (New Orleans), a twin riverboat casino complex in New Orleans, Louisiana

== See also ==
- River city (disambiguation)
