= Knights of Chaos =

New Orleans Mardi Gras krewe

- Abbreviation: KoC
- Named after: Chaos
- Formation: 2000; 26 years ago
- Type: All-Male Carnival Krewe
- Location: New Orleans, LA.
- Website: kreweofchaos.net

Knights of Chaos is an all-male New Orleans Carnival Krewe and rumored facade for the Knights of Momus.

== Parade ==
The Knights of Chaos parade on Jeudi Gras, the traditional night of the Momus, the Thursday night prior to Mardi Gras. The parade follows the uptown route for parades starting at Napoleon Avenue and Magazine Street; proceed north to St. Charles; proceed east on St. Charles to Lee Circle continuing on St. Charles to Canal Street. The parade follows the Knights of Babylon parade and is followed by the Krewe of Muses.

The Knights of Chaos use flambeaux to light the route.

=== Parade themes ===
Knights of Chaos parade themes are typically satirical in nature and are not revealed until the parade rolls.

- 2021 Chaos Cleans House **No Parades - Covid 19**
- 2020 Looking Forward to Chaos
- 2019 Chaos Hugs It Out **No Parade - Weather**
- 2018 Nature Calls...Chaos
- 2017 Chaos in the Streets
- 2016 Chaos Theory
- 2015 Chaos Says N.O.!
- 2014 Chaos Goes to Hell
- 2013 Chaos Goes Overboard
- 2012 Chaos Skirts the Issues
- 2011 Chaos Eats Out, No Reservations
- 2010 Chaos Has A Ball **No Parade - Weather**
- 2009 Naturally Chaos
- 2008 No Parade - Weather
- 2007 Chaos Breaks Wind
- 2006 Hades: A Dream of Chaos
- 2005 Chaos Spins the Beatles
- 2004 Chaos Tells Tales of Tails
- 2003 Chaos Goes to Sunday School
- 2002 Chaos Goes Fish'n
- 2001 Causin' Chaos

=== Royal court ===
The Knights of Chaos king is named Chaos, sometimes known as Number One. The identity of Chaos is kept secret and is never revealed.

== See also ==
- Knights of Momus
- Twelfth Night Revelers
