= Krewe of Muses =

New Orleans all-female krewe

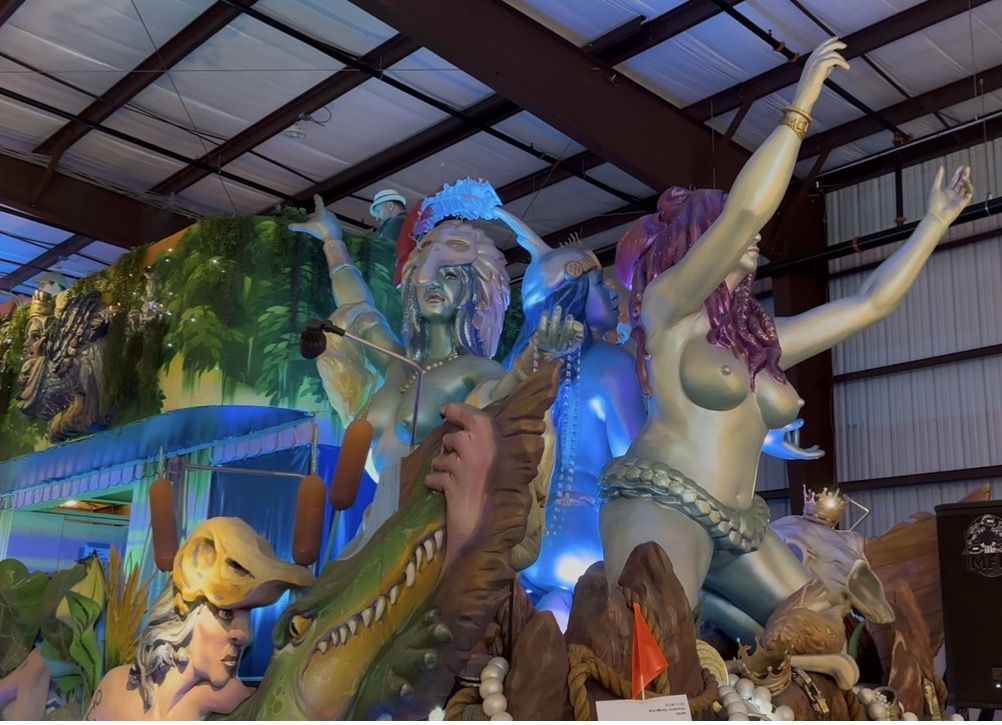
- Final float of the parade, depicting the singing Sirens
- Formation: 2000; 26 years ago; First Parade 2001
- Founder: Staci Rosenberg
- Type: All Female Carnival Krewe
- Location: Uptown, New Orleans, LA.
- Members: 1100 (875 riders)
- Website: www.kreweofmuses.org

The Krewe of Muses is an all-female super krewe and social organization.

== History and formation ==
The Krewe of Muses is a social aid and pleasure club founded in 2000 by New Orleans attorney Staci Rosenberg which first paraded during Mardi Gras in 2001. Since then the Krewe has grown to approximately 1100 members. The Krewe's parade is held on the Thursday evening before Mardi Gras, and features 30 floats designed by Kern Studios.

== Parade ==
Krewe of Muses parade on Jeudi Gras, the Thursday night prior to Mardi Gras - which members call "tHERSday" as a nod to being a women's Krewe. The parade starts in Uptown New Orleans at Magazine Street and Jefferson Avenue, then proceeds east to Napoleon Avenue where it turns left and follows Knights of Babylon and Knights of Chaos up Napoleon Avenue, turning right onto St. Charles Avenue and into downtown New Orleans, turning right onto Canal Street, and ending at approximately Tchoupitoulas Street at Poydras Street. The parade is followed by the "aMUSEment" party for members and their guests at a nearby venue, and features live entertainment. Unlike some other krewes, Krewe of Muses does not hold a traditional bal masque.

=== Parade themes ===
Krewe of Muses season parade theme is secret until Jeudi Gras, when it is published with illustrations of each float in the Times-Picayune, and revealed when the parade rolls. The theme is always satirical.

In 2006 to honor the victims of Hurricane Katrina, the Muses had an empty float at the tail end of their parade, evoking the riderless horse that follows the caisson carrying the casket in a funeral procession.

- 2026 Muses Mystery Machine - Shoe-B-Do-B-Doo
- 2025 Return of Supermuse - The Age of Sheroes
- 2024 Museapalooza
- 2023 Goodnight Muse
- 2022 Let It Ride 21 or Bust
- 2021 - no parade due to Covid 19 pandemic
- 2020 Visions: NostradaMuse Sees All
- 2019 Muses the Musical
- 2018 A Night at the Museum
- 2017 Dr. Meuss on the Loose, Oh The Parade We'll Throw!
- 2016 Muses Sweet Sixteen
- 2015 Are You There God? It's Us, Muses!
- 2014 Muses Ready To Wear You Out
- 2013 Muses Makin' Groceries
- 2012 Muses Go Shopping, Taking it to the Limit
- 2011 Dancing with the Muses
- 2010 The Muses Guide to Love and Romance
- 2009 Muses 009: License to Swill
- 2008 Muses Night Fever
- 2007 The Adventures of Supermuse
- 2006 Muses Got Game
- 2005 Muse TV, We'll Turn You On
- 2004 The Weekly World Muse, Enquiring Muses Want to Know
- 2003 Museology—the Lesser Known Gods and Goddesses
- 2002 Muses Reach the Terrible Twos
- 2001 Muses First Time

=== Honorary Muses ===
Krewe of Muses select an "Honorary Muse" each parade season. The honoree is someone who the Krewe feels is an inspiration to girls and women, and usually has strong ties to New Orleans and/or Louisiana. Each year's Honorary Muse rides in one of the Krewe's signature floats - a large, red, fiber optic high heeled shoe.

- 2026 Soledad O'Brien
- 2025 Rutina Wesley
- 2024 Margaret Orr
- 2023 Irma Thomas
- 2022 Swin Cash
- 2020 Jennifer Coolidge
- 2019 Patricia Clarkson
- 2018 LaToya Cantrell
- 2017 Tamron Hall
- 2016 Solange Knowles
- 2015 Sue Zemanick
- 2014 Julia Reed
- 2013 Ruby Bridges
- 2012 Patricia Clarkson
- 2011 Liz McCartney
- 2010 Mary Matalin
- 2009 Kimberly Rivers Roberts
- 2008 Marva Wright
- 2007 Brenda Marie Osbey
- 2006 Becky Zaheri
- 2005 Charmaine Neville
- 2004 Becky Allen
- 2003 Maria Giacobbe
- 2002 Cherice Harrison-Nelson

=== Floats ===
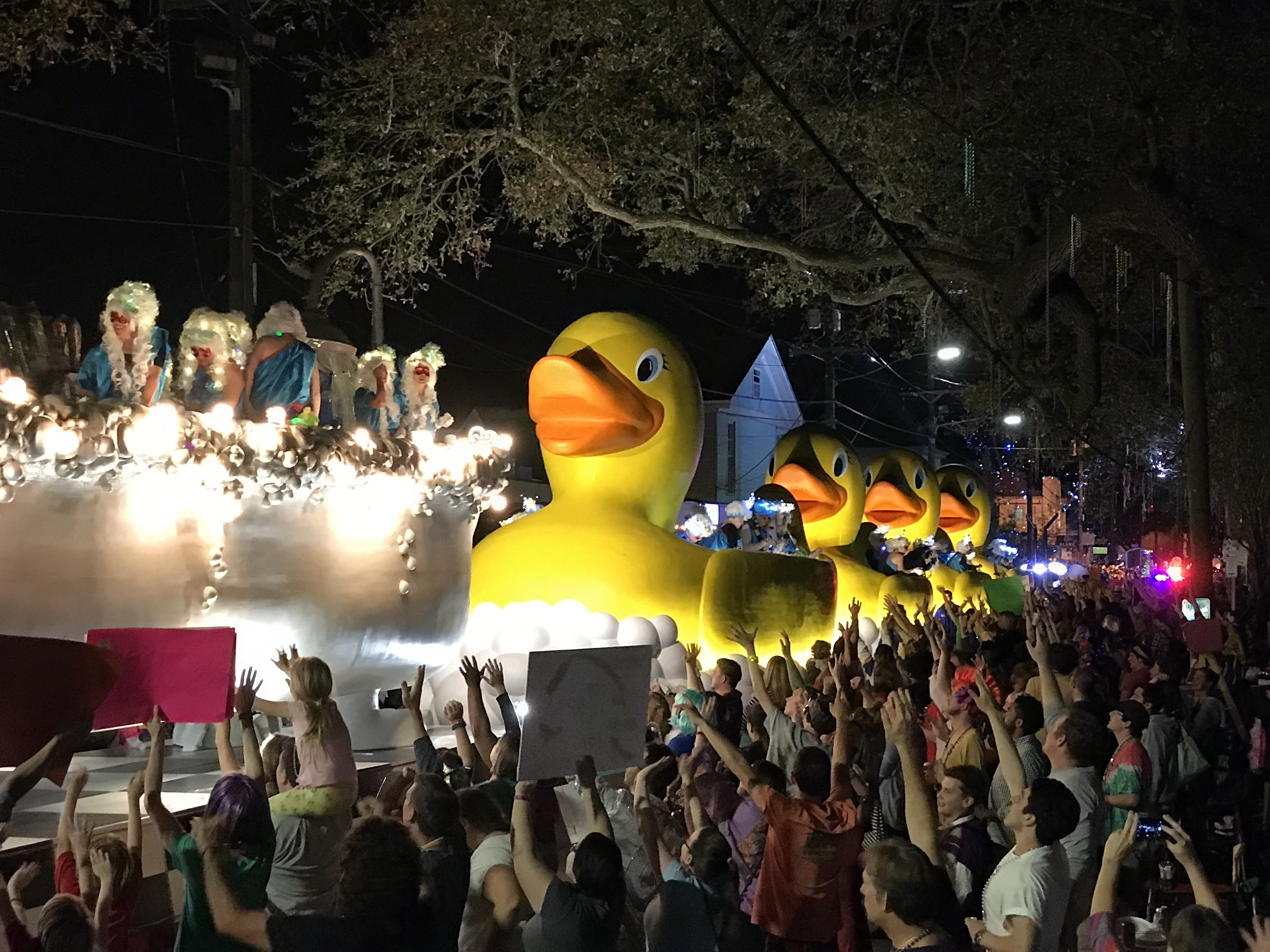
Muses Mama and Baby Duck Floats

- The Goddessey is the first float in the parade and carries the Krewe captain and officers. Muses Krewe member Susan Gisleson designed “The Goddessey.” Built by Kerns Studios, it features Greek mythology's winged stallion, Pegasus; symbols for the nine muses in Greek mythology; and more than 100 peach-colored lanterns hanging from the Tree of Knowledge.
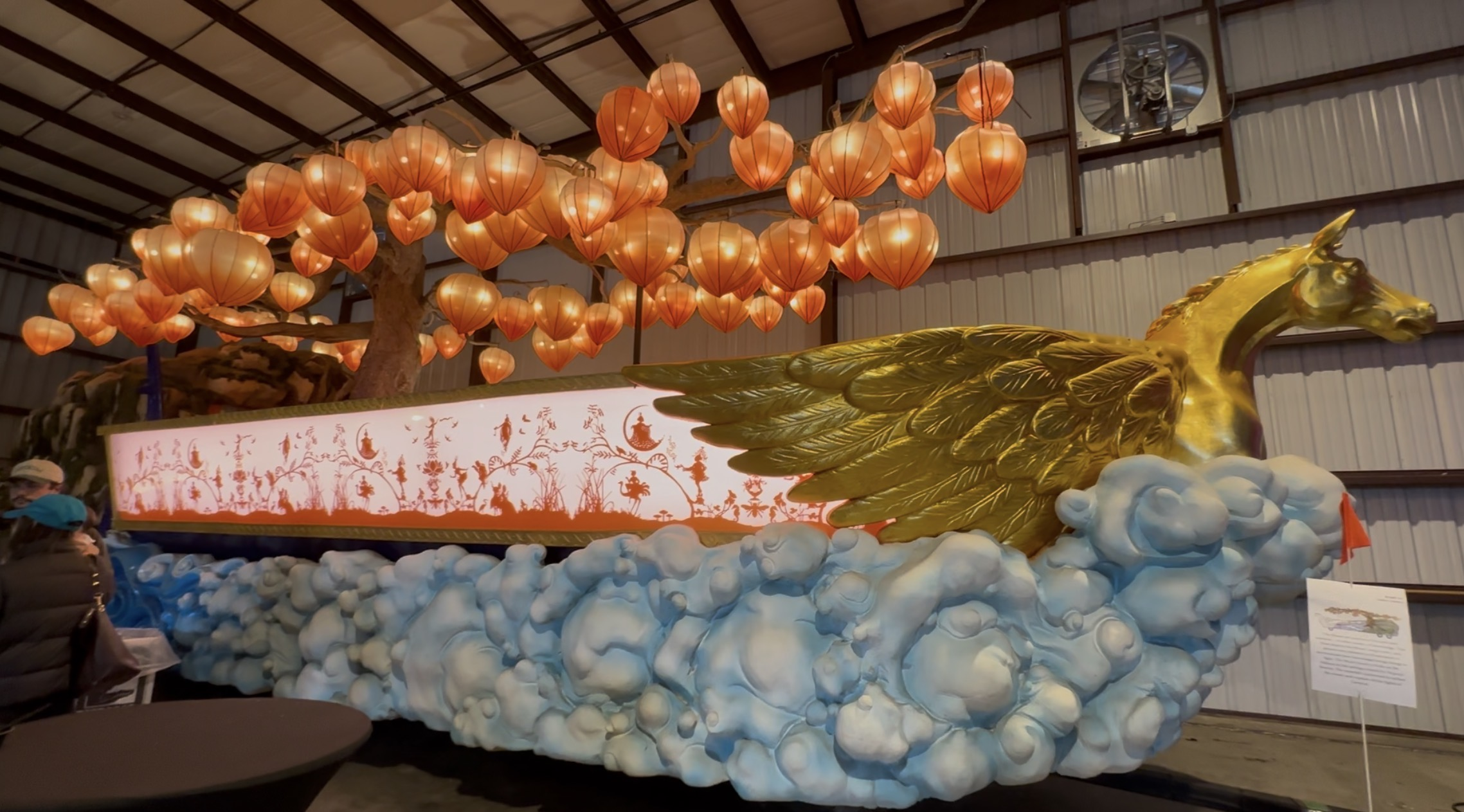
  Depicts the birthplace of the Nine Muses and signifies their role in The Odyssey
- High Heel Shoe carries the Honorary Muse of the Parade
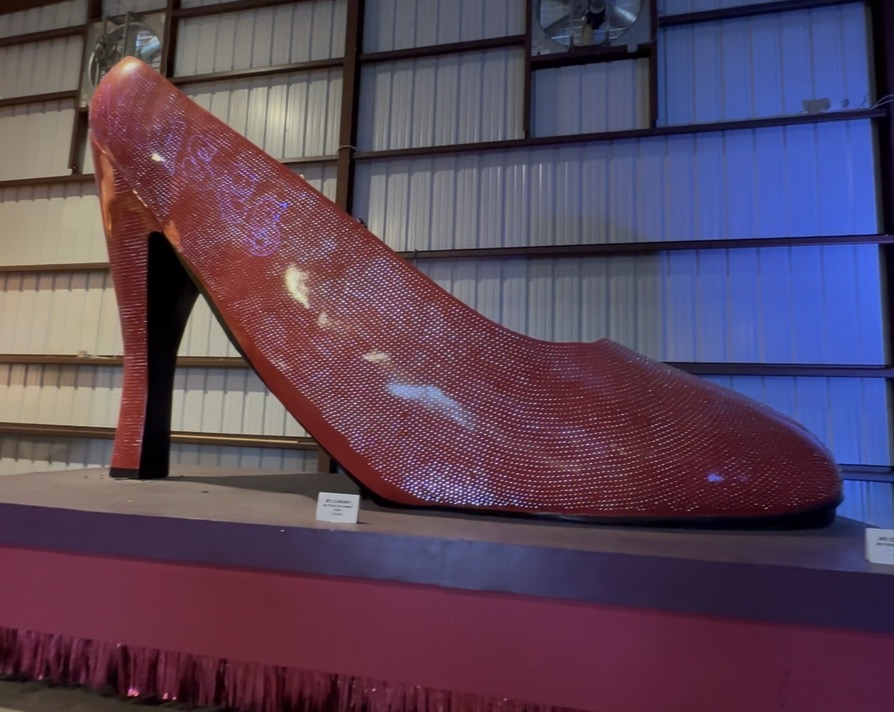
  17' tall LED-lit shoe that carries the year's Honorary Muse and her parade helpers
- Bathing Muses (Tub), Mama Duck and Duckies
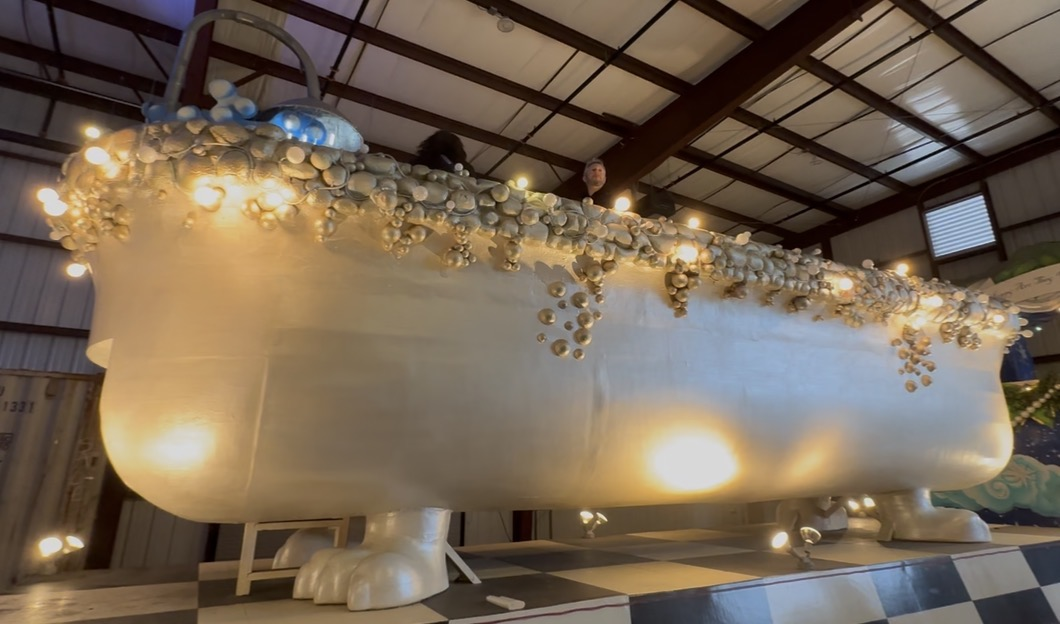
  Bathtub signature float; precedes Mama Duck and Baby Ducks
- The Sirens is the final float in the parade.

=== Throws ===
Since its inception, Muses has emphasized gifting usable and "reMUSEable" throws to parade-goers. This has included soap, earbuds, socks, water bottles, luggage tags, pens and notebooks, bandanas and scarves. In recent years, in response to city-wide efforts to keep storm drains clean and reduce environmental impact, Muses has scaled down the amount of single-use plastic in their manufactured throws, focusing on quality and durability. They have reduced the amount of traditional beads, and - like their logo polystone medallions - have found new ways to make certain items easier to repurpose, such as adding a "lobster claw" clasp or magnet. Many of the Muses tote bags, pencil bags, and cosmetic bags are also made from recycled materials.

Inspired by the Krewe of Zulu Coconut, the Krewe's signature throw is an upcycled high-heeled shoe. Each member decorates her own thrifted and gifted shoes year-round, incorporating glitter, paint, decoupage, and baubles and trims. They are presented in bags tied with ribbon, and often include personal cards or notes from the Krewe member who created them. The shoes are not wearable and the recipient is given one, not a pair.

== Other activities ==
The Krewe of Muses displays have won awards.

As one of their community activities, the Krewe hosts a yearly design contest for local students. The winner has his or her design printed on that year's signature throw cup.

The Krewe engages in community outreach and fundraising year-round. They plan and host events that are both private to members and open to the public, raising funds and awareness for local charities and other philanthropic organizations.

== Depictions in media ==
- The Sirens float appears in the music video for Arcade Fire's Electric Blue. Video on YouTube
- The Krewe of Muses parade is featured in the opening sequence in HBO's Treme season 2, episode 7 "Carnival Time".
- The Krewe has been featured in several special exhibitions at The Presbytere, part of The Louisiana State Museum, including "Iris and the Goddesses of Carnival" (2017–2018), and "Pioneers of Women's Carnival" (2025–2026).
