= Kern Studios =

American float building and entertainment design production company

Kern Studios is a float building and entertainment design production company based in New Orleans, Louisiana, USA. The studio creates large floats for events like Mardi Gras in addition to props and themed environments for theme parks, casinos, and corporate entities.

== History ==
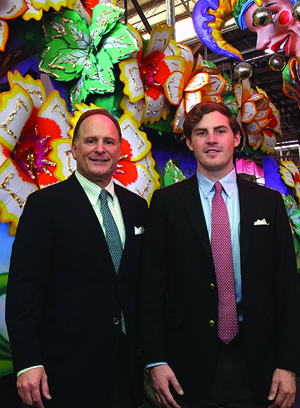
Barry Kern (left) and Fitz Kern (right), 3rd and 4th generation at Kern Studios.

A family-run company, Kern Studios dates back to 1932, when Roy Kern an artist who became a sign painter built his first Mardi Gras Float with the help of his young son, Blaine. In 1947, Blaine founded Blaine Kern Artists and began a float-building career and created the most prolific float building company in the world building floats for the New Orleans Mardi Gras.

Kern traveled to Europe to learn more about float building, since gaining an international reputation while designing, building and producing floats, parades, festivals, events and theming for theme parks, museums, sports teams and municipalities worldwide. In 1984, Kern Studios expanded to include Mardi Gras World, a tourist attraction where visitors can see behind-the-scenes of Kern Studios. Barry Kern is the current president and CEO of Kern Studios and Mardi Gras World.

== Mardi Gras ==
Kern Studios is responsible for building Mardi Gras floats used by a variety of New Orleans Mardi Gras krewes each year. It was creating over 300 floats by the 1970s and over 400 floats by the 2010s. The company consistently creates floats for Krewe of Orpheus, Endymion, Rex parade, Krewe of Muses, Krewe of Bacchus, and Krewe of Tucks in addition to several other krewes. The studio also builds floats for Krewe of Boo, New Orleans’ official Halloween krewe.

== Corporate Designs ==
Kern Studios has created themed environments for Harrah's Casinos, including both interior and exterior décor. The Walt Disney Company and Universal Studios are two notable clients for Kern Studios, whose work has been displayed at Disney locations in Paris, Shanghai, and Hong Kong and Universal Studios locations in California, Orlando, and Japan. Kern Studios has also created large-scale artwork for Nickelodeon; Chick-Fil-A; Mars, Incorporated; Coca-Cola, Six Flags; Everland; and the National Football League. In 2010, Kern Studios produced the Saints Super Bowl parade and kickoff parade for Super Bowl XLIV.
