= Margaret Orr =

American meteorologist

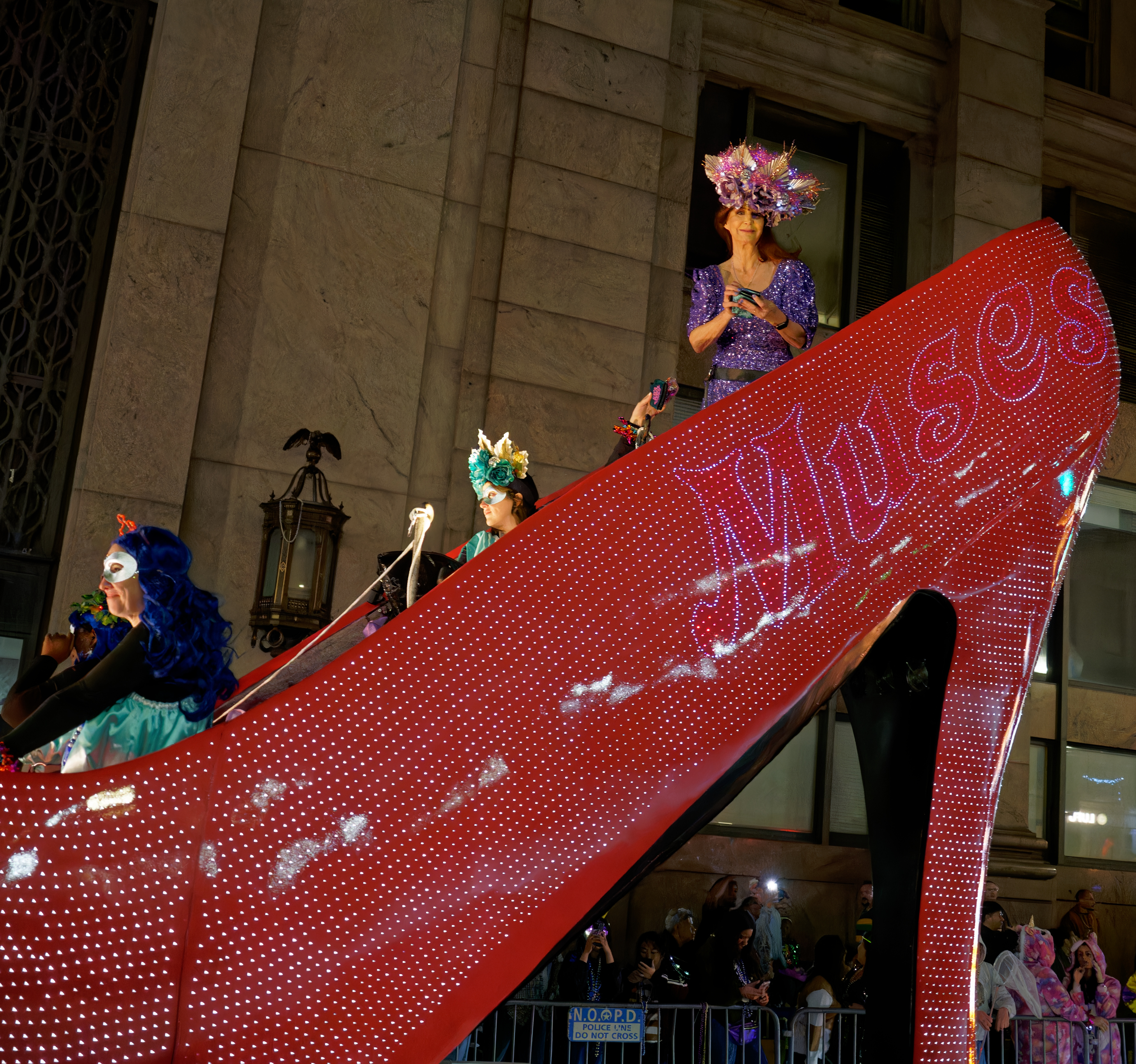
- Orr (upper right) as "Honorary Muse" in the 2024 Krewe of Muses parade
- Born: Margaret Orr
- Education: Louisiana State University
- Years active: 1979–present
- Known for: Broadcast Meteorologist
- Spouse: Bill Settoon (Died in 2025)

Margaret Orr is the former chief meteorologist for WDSU in New Orleans.

== Career ==
A graduate of Louisiana State University and a certificate holder from the meteorology program at Mississippi State University, Orr had a fascination with weather ever since Hurricane Betsy hit New Orleans in 1965. She started her weather forecasting career in Charleston, South Carolina but returned home to New Orleans in July 1979, when she joined WDSU, and she has remained there ever since. She co-hosted Breakfast Edition and also co-hosted World's Fair Show during the 1984 Louisiana World Exposition. In 2009, she was promoted to chief meteorologist after the semi-retirement of Dan Milham. She is heavily involved in tracking hurricanes.

She holds a seal of approval from the American Meteorological Society and the National Weather Association.

== Personal life ==
Orr grew up in New Orleans, where she attended Louise S. McGehee High School, graduating in 1971. She later attended and graduated from Louisiana State University, where she was a member of Kappa Alpha Theta. She is widowed, and has three children and a dog named Bleu.
