= Twelfth Night Revelers =

Mardi Gras krewe (e. 1870)

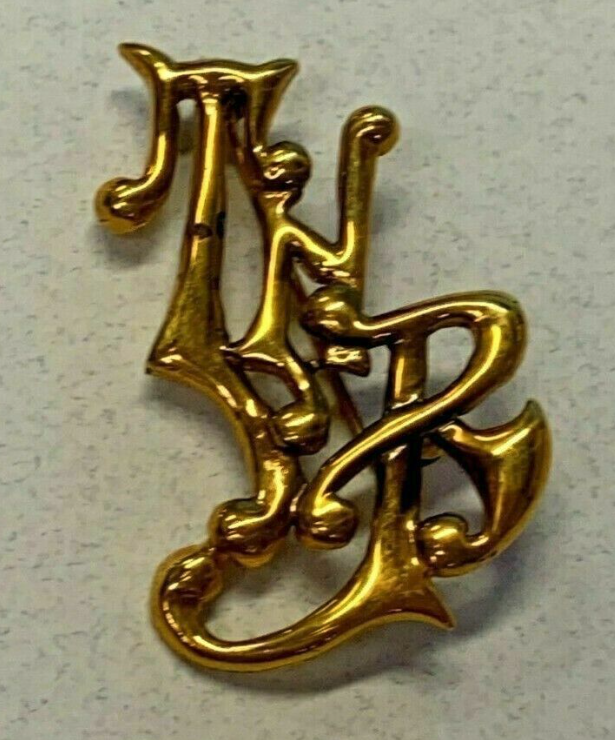
- Twelfth Night Revelers Pin 2009
- Abbreviation: TNR
- Named after: Twelfth Night
- Formation: January 6, 1870; 156 years ago
- Founder: Sidney Smith
- Type: Carnival Krewe
- Location: New Orleans, Louisiana

The Twelfth Night Revelers (TNR), founded in 1870, is a New Orleans, Louisiana, Carnival Krewe. It is the second oldest continuous organization of New Orleans Carnival festivities.

== History and formation ==
In 1870, Sidney Smith, the son of a Striker from Mobile, Alabama, organized the Twelfth Night Revelers in New Orleans, nearly 30 years after the Strikers Independent Society was formed in Mobile, Alabama, and 13 years after the Mistick Krewe in 1857.

== Carnival traditions ==
From its inauguration in 1870, the Twelfth Night Revelers introduced the Twelfth Night Cake or King Cake cut by the leader, the Lord of Misrule. Also that year the Grand March, the first of the new wrinkles planned by the new krewe (and copied by almost all krewes that followed). In 1871 a Santa Claus masker appeared in a street pageant, and distributed favors to the crowd, inaugurating the practice of throwing trinkets from parades, or throws. Also that year a Queen was chosen and with her a royal court of young ladies were presented as debutants. The introduction of political satire with its 1873 parade, titled "The World of Audubon."

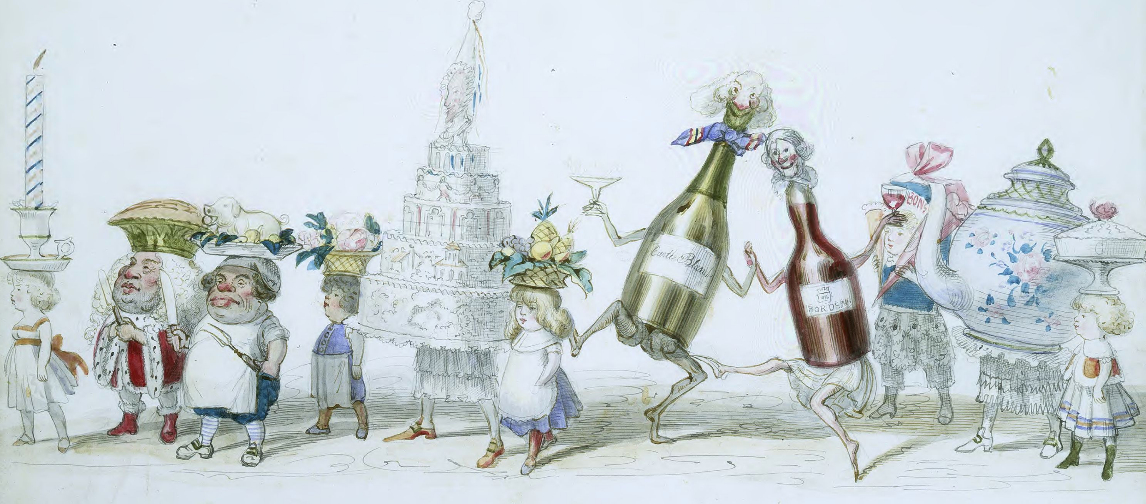
Twelfth Night Pageant Illustration

== Theme ==
- 1870 Twelfth Night Revel.(w/parade) Queen: None
- 1871 Mother Goose's Tea Party.(w/parade) Queen: Emma Butler
- 1872 English Humor.(w/parade) Queen: Miss Ada Bringier
- 1873 The World of Audubon.(w/parade)
- 1874 Dolliana and Her Kingdom.(w/parade)
- 1875 No Event
- 1876 The March of Ages (last parade of the original club) Queen: Miss Ada Bringier
- 1877 No event
- 1878 A Twelfth Night Revel. Queen: Catherine Buckner
- 1879 No Ball
- 1880 No Ball
- 1881 No Ball
- 1882 No Ball
- 1883 No Ball
- 1884 The Kingdom of Flowers. Queen: Queen Alice Herndon
- 1885 "Domino" could refer to a Theme or type of less, informal, Ball. Queen: Blanche Moulton
- 1886 Unknown Theme. Queen Fannie Milliken
- 1887 "Domino" could refer to a Theme or type of less, informal, ball. Queen: Lelia Bohn
- 1888 Unknown
- 1889 "King's Own Royal Guard." Reorganized as the King's Own Royal Guard, members appeared as an escort to the REX on Mardi Gras day.
- 1890 King's Own Royal Guard.
- 1891 Scenes From the Crusades
- 1892 Argonauts Tableau Ball: "Theseus the Victor." Queen: Josephine Maginnis
- 1893 Argonauts Tableau Ball Theme: "The Arrival of the Argo"
- 1894 A Twelfth Night Revel. Queen: Fanny Eshleman
- 1895 Les Incroyables
- 1896 That Orbed Maiden with White Fire Laden
- 1897 The Chrysanthemum
- 1898 Minstrels of the Olden Time
- 1899 The Realm of the Butterflies
- 1900 The Four Seasons
- 1901 The Palace of the Water Nymphs
- 1902 The Birthnight of the Hummingbird
- 1903 Pierrot Domino
- 1904 Harlequin
- 1905 A Night in Japan
- 1906 The Cave of Magic
- 1907 The Realm of Peace
- 1908 The Court of Misrule
- 1909 The Revels of the Gems
- 1910 The Garden of the Gods
- 1911 The Battle of the Flowers
- 1912 The Butterfly
- 1913 The Origins and Quaint Customs of Twelfth Night
- 1914 Peer Gynt
- 1915 The Great Chan and the Fairy Se Wang Moo
- 1916 The Myth of the Gilded Man
- 1917 Sheik-Al-Jabal
- 1920 Scraps
- 1921 The Rock-A-Bye Lady
- 1922 Snow Queen
- 1923 Ayesha
- 1924 Masques-Music
- 1925 Mah Jongg
- 1926 A Christmas Frolic
- 1927 The Queen of Sheba Visits the Court of King Solomon
- 1928 The Queen of Apia
- 1929 The Spirit of Carnival
- 1930 Princess White Rose and the Aurora Borealis
- 1931 A Fantastic Dream
- 1932 The Coronation of the Peacock
- 1933 Pierrots
- 1934 The Emperor's New Clothes
- 1935 The Court of Henry VII
- 1936 The Peace of the Roses
- 1937 Twelfth Night in India
- 1938 A Reminiscence of Lafcadio Hearn
- 1939 Night Dance in the Valley. Queen Charlotte Hardie
- 1940 Rho-dope
- 1941 The Realm of Neptunes Rex
- 1942 Unknown
- 1943 Unknown
- 1944 Unknown
- 1945 Unknown
- 1946 Bride of the Rain God
- 1947 The Lord of Misrule Honors the Victors of his Royal Tournament
- 1948 In a Persian Vineyard
- 1949 Bells in Comedy
- 1950 A Northland Saga
- 1951 No presentation
- 1952 A Phantasy of Precious Stones
- 1953 The Garden of Hesperides
- 1954 In a Coral Wonderland
- 1955 Britain's Queen Visits Bonnie Scotland
- 1956 In the Realm of Cloudland

== Gallery ==
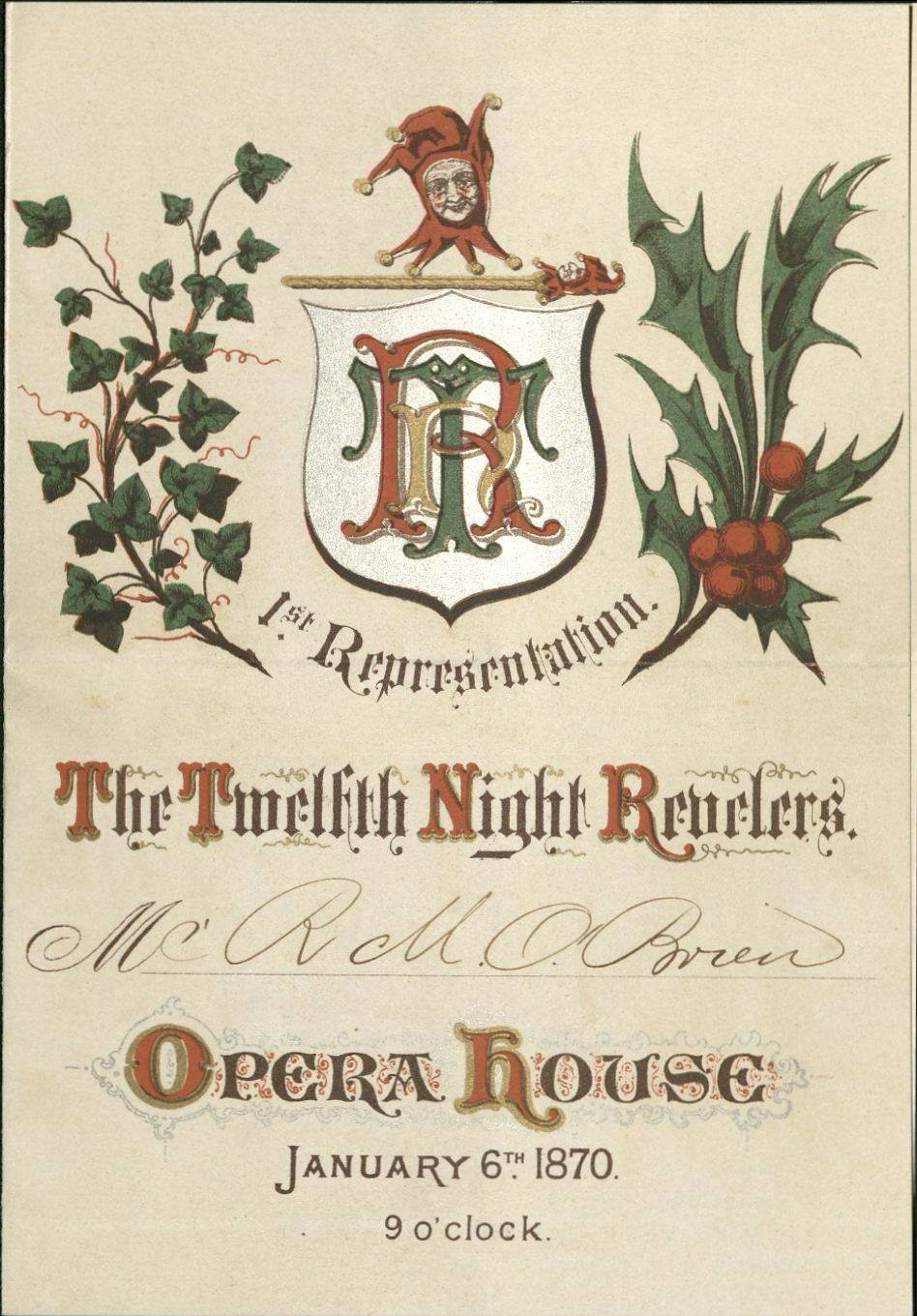
1870 Admittance Card

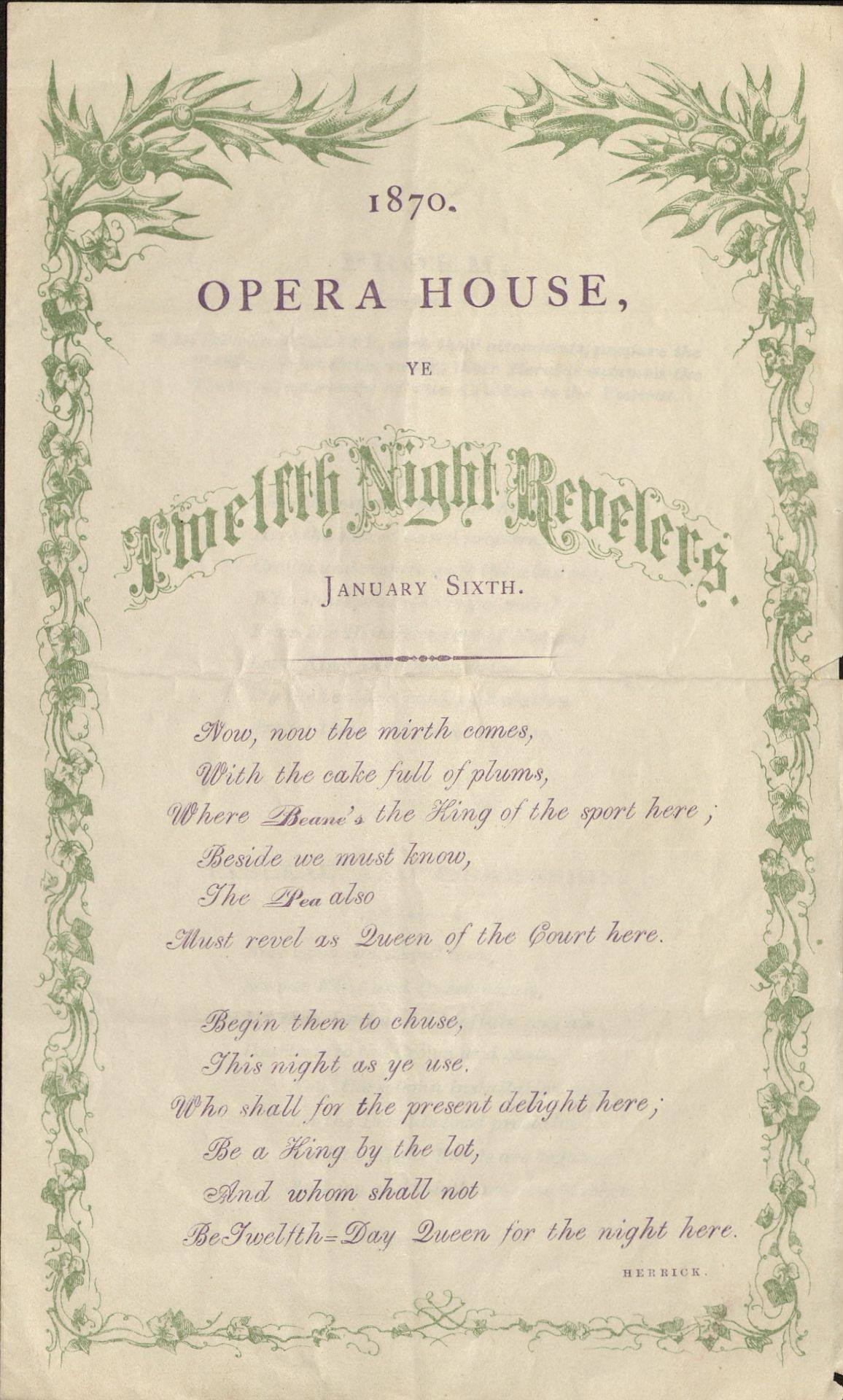
1870 Program

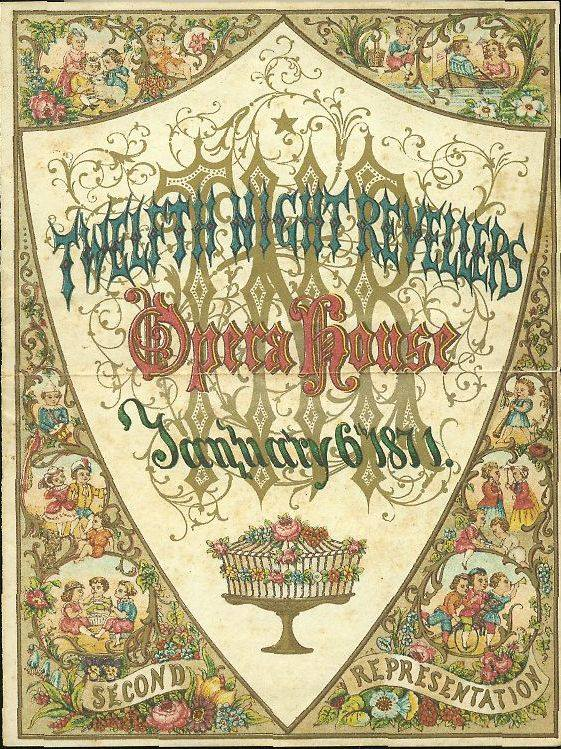
1871 Invitation

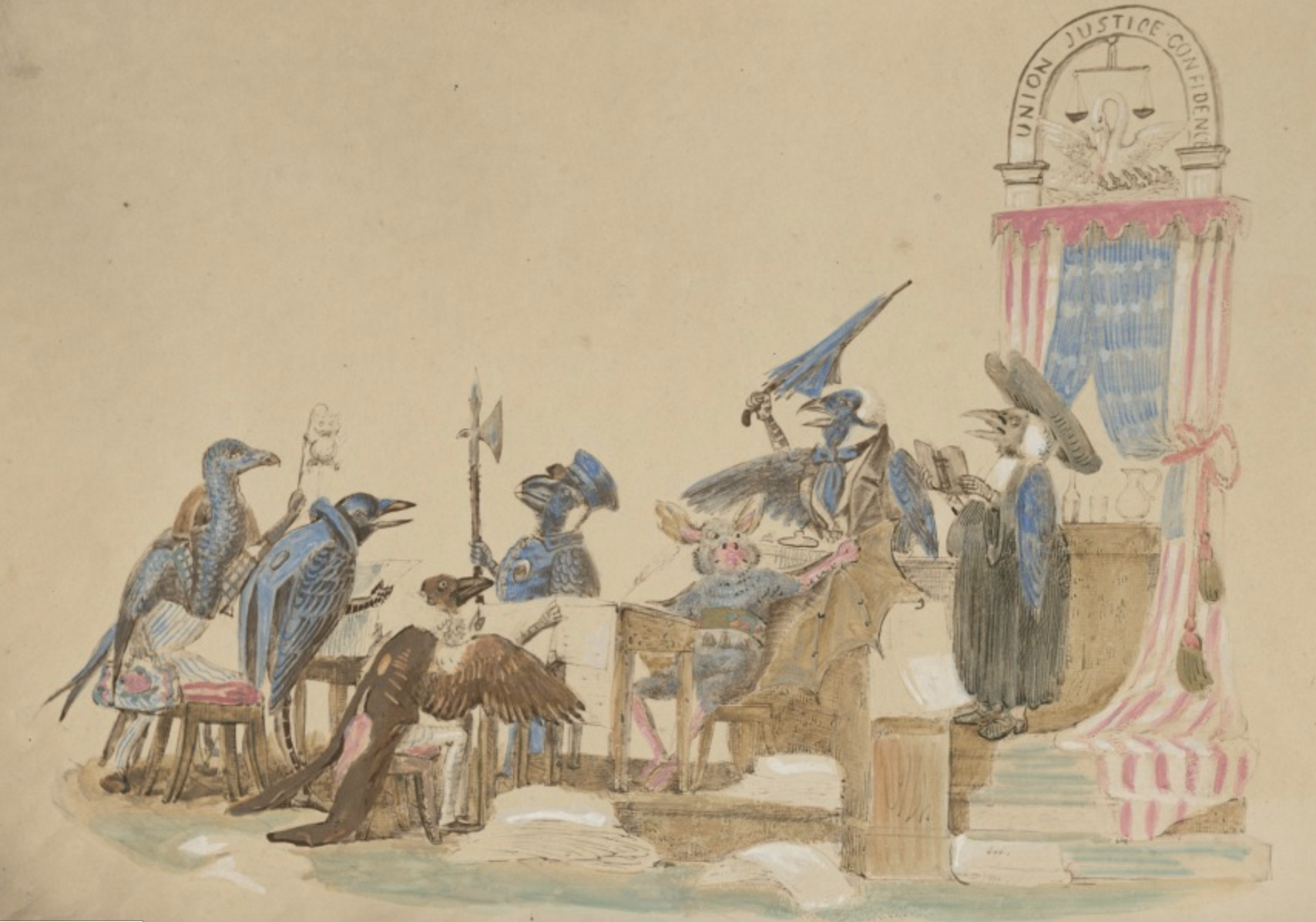
1873 Float Design

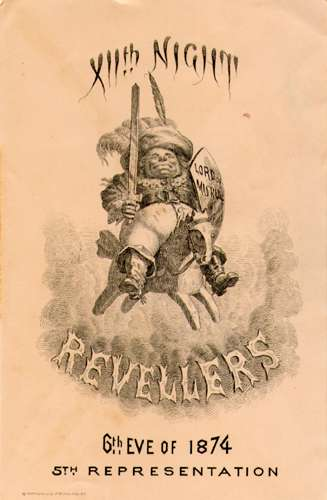
1874 Program

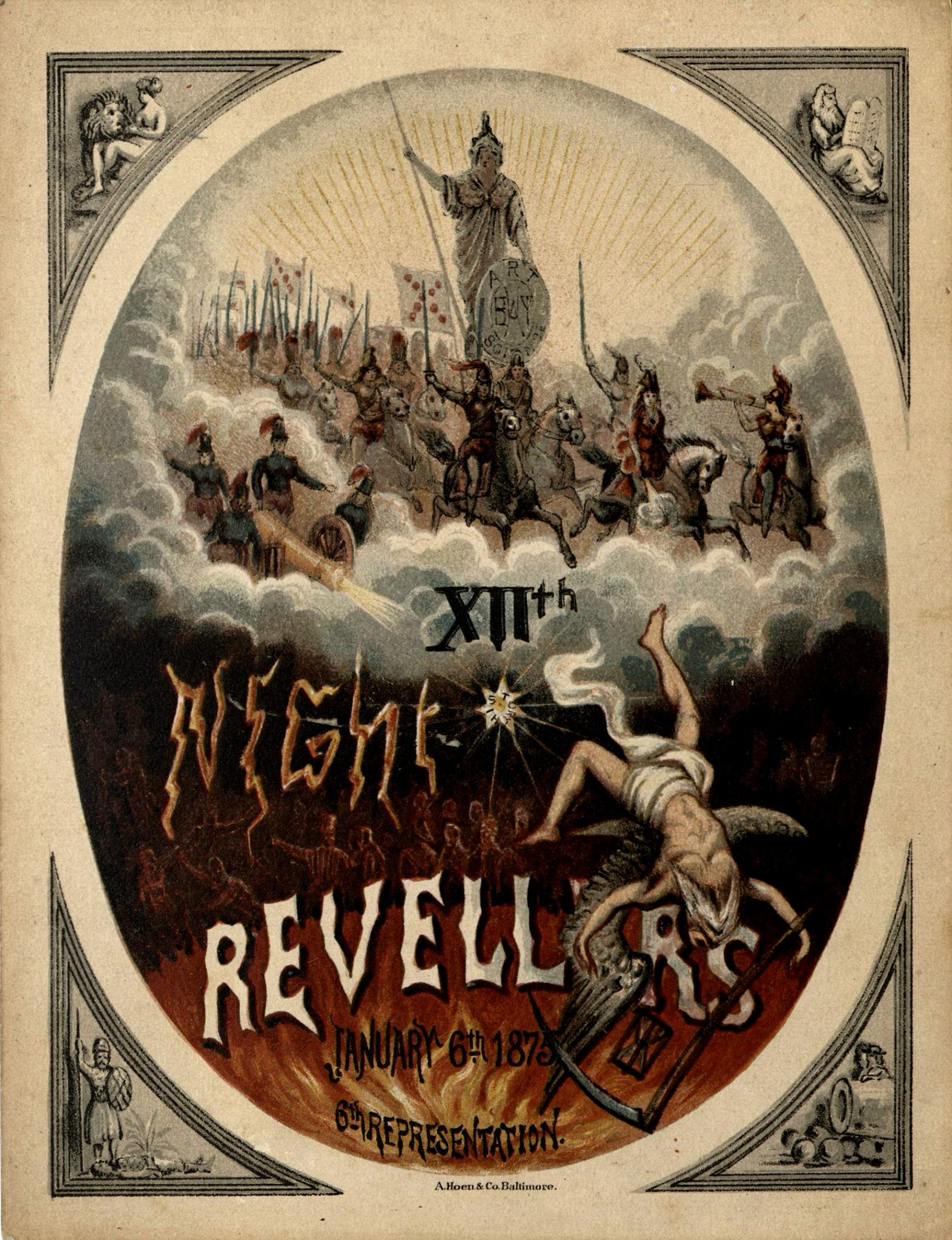
1875 Invitation

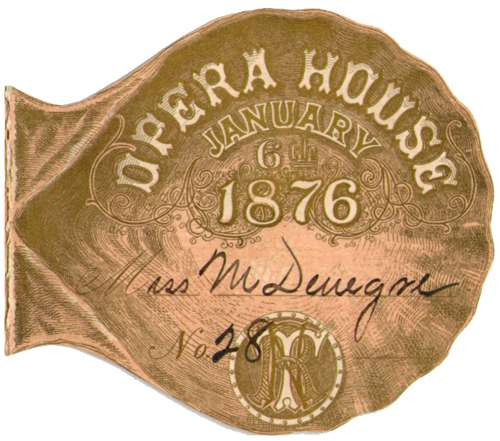
1876 Admittance Card

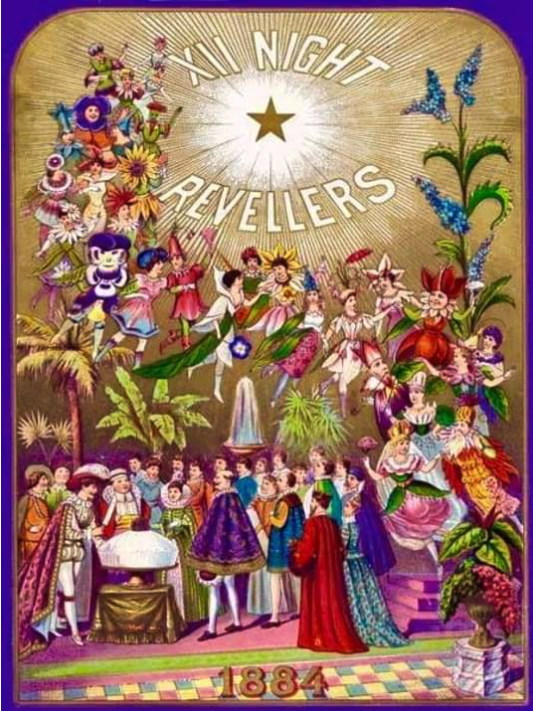
1884 Invitation

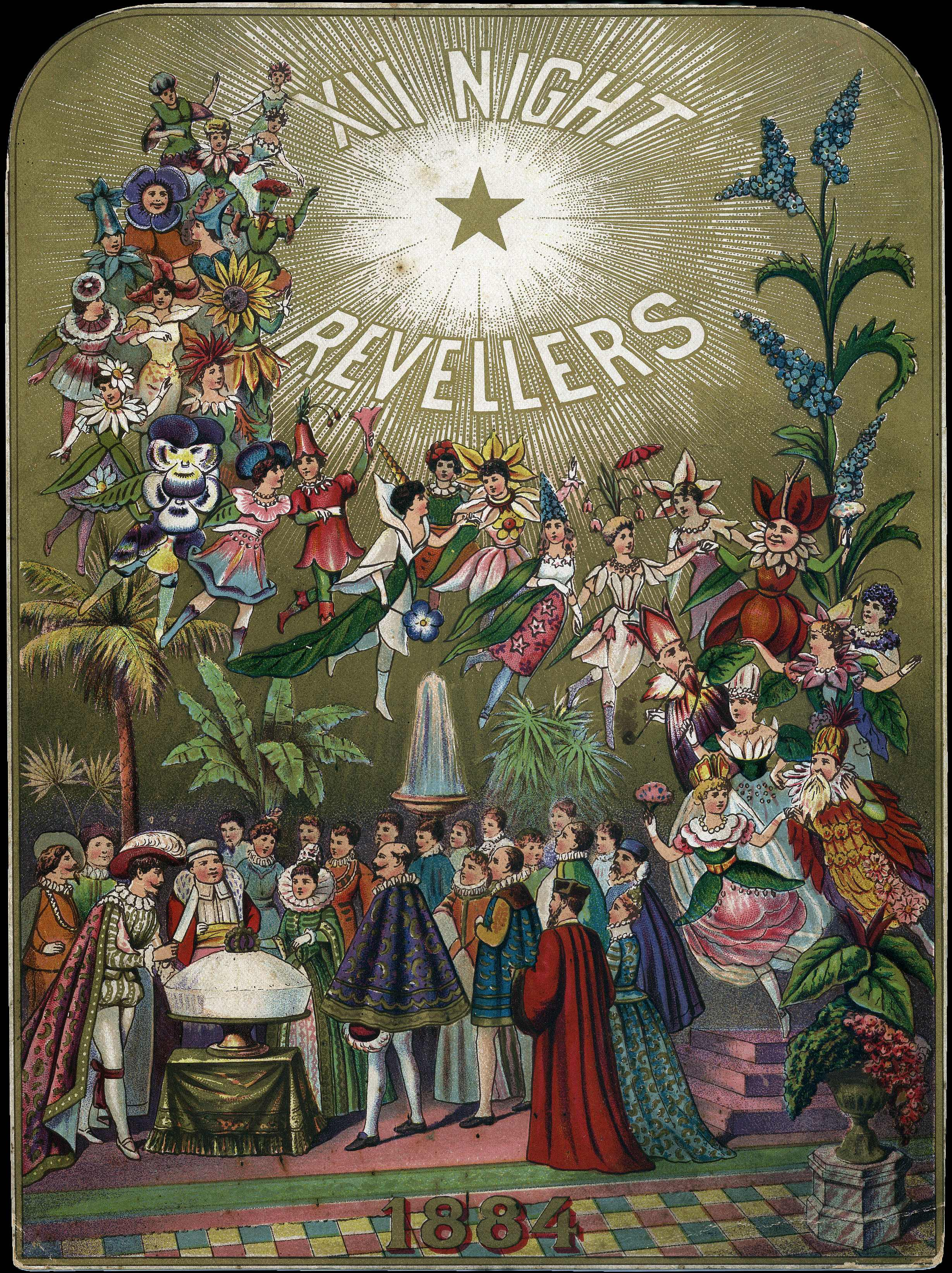
1884 Invitation

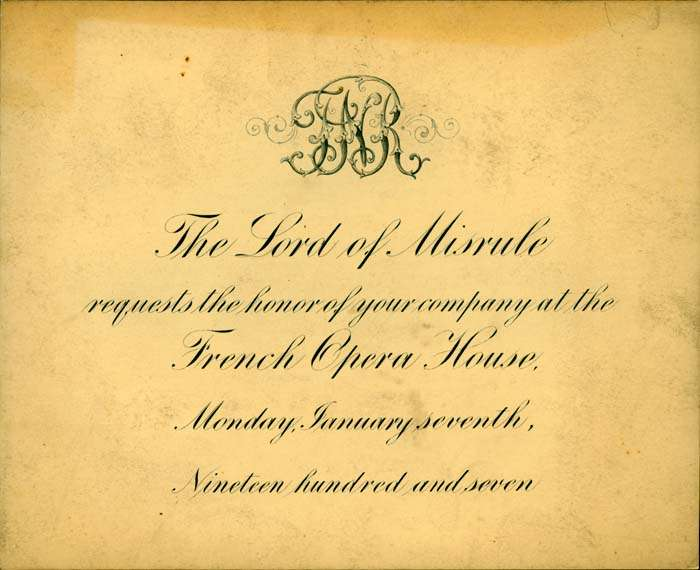
1907 Admittance Card

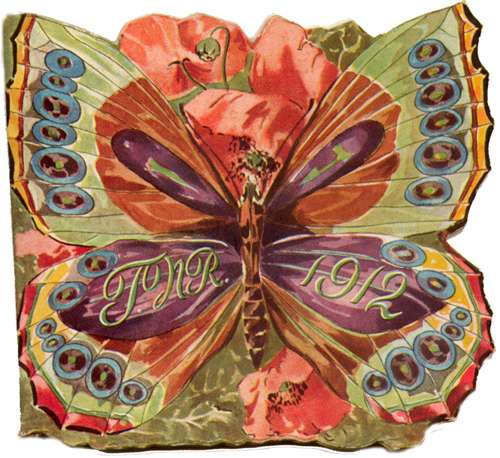
1912 Invitation

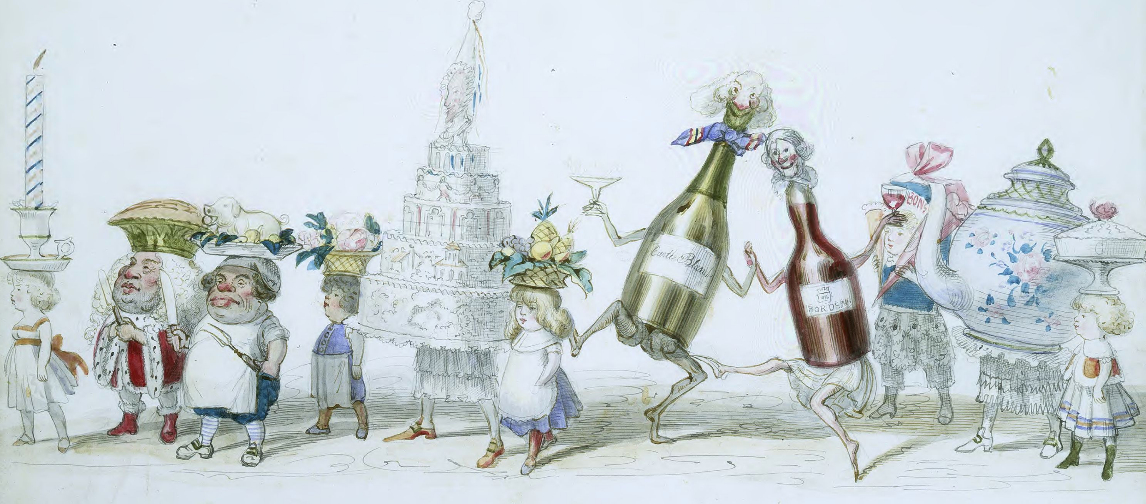
Twelfth Night Revelers Pageant Design, Charles Briton

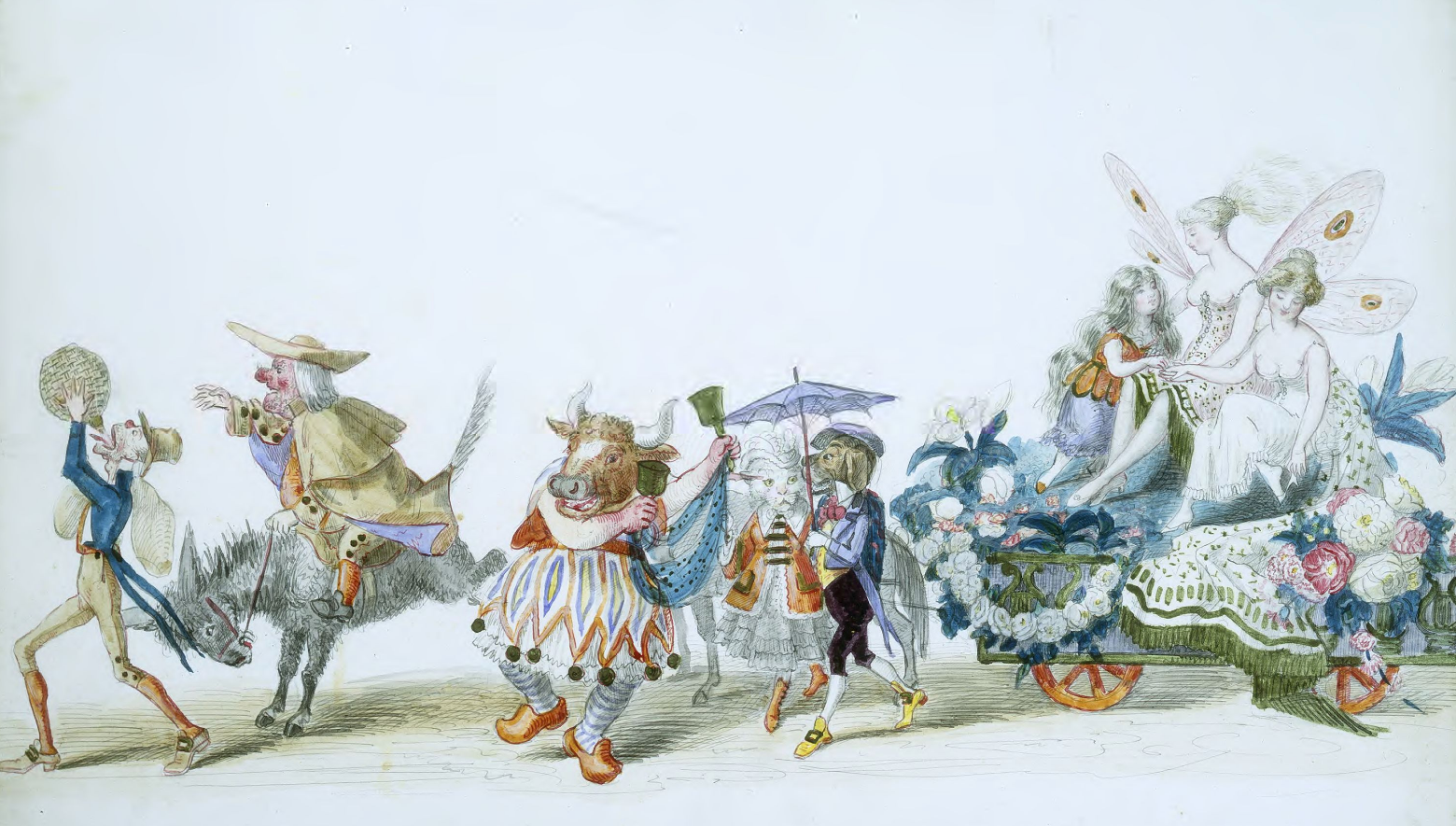
Twelfth Night Revelers Krewe Illustration

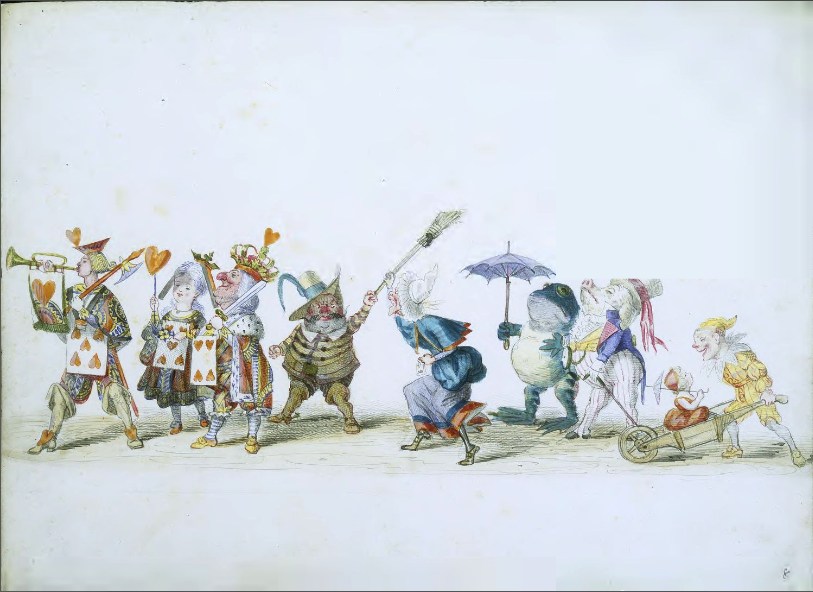
Twelfth Night Pageant Illustration

== See also ==
- Knights of Momus
- The Louisiana Club
- Mistick Krewe
- Knights of Chaos
