= River City =

River City may refer to:

== City nickname ==
=== Australia ===
- Brisbane, Queensland

=== Canada ===
- Campbell River, British Columbia
- Edmonton, Alberta
- Winnipeg, Manitoba

=== China ===
- Jilin City
- Wuhan

=== New Zealand ===
- Whanganui

=== United States ===
- Cape Girardeau, Missouri
- Central, Louisiana
- Chattanooga, Tennessee
- Columbia, South Carolina
- Danville, Virginia
- Decatur, Alabama
- Evansville, Indiana
- Grand Junction, Colorado
- Grand Rapids, Michigan
- Huntington, West Virginia
- Jacksonville, Florida
- Lawrence, Kansas
- Louisville, Kentucky
- Mason City, Iowa
- Minneapolis, Minnesota
- Missoula, Montana
- Omaha, Nebraska
- Peoria, Illinois
- Pittsburgh, Pennsylvania
- Richmond, Virginia
- Sacramento, California
- San Antonio, Texas
- Spokane, Washington
- St. Louis, Missouri
- Vancouver, Washington

== Establishments ==
- River City (building), a condominium complex in Chicago, Illinois, United States
- River City Casino (Lemay), St. Louis, Missouri, United States
- River City Casino (New Orleans), a twin riverboat casino complex which operated for only nine weeks in 1995 in New Orleans, Louisiana, United States
- River City Bangkok, a shopping mall in Bangkok, Thailand

== Fiction ==
- River City (novel), a 2011 novel by Trevor Ferguson
- River City, Iowa, the fictional setting of the live and filmed realizations of the musical The Music Man
- River City (TV series), a television drama produced by BBC Scotland
- River City (video game series), video game franchise
  - River City, the fictional setting of River City video games
- River City, the fictional home of the DC Comics hero Odd Man

== Other uses ==
- River City Relay, a famous American football play occurring in 2003
- River City Rhythm Drum and Bugle Corps, an Open Class junior drum and bugle corps from Anoka, Minnesota, United States
- "River City", a multiservice tactical brevity code, an order to implement immediate communications blackout until further notice
- "Rivercity", a song by All That Remains from the album Madness, 2017
