= Knights of Momus =

Krewe in the New Orleans Mardi Gras

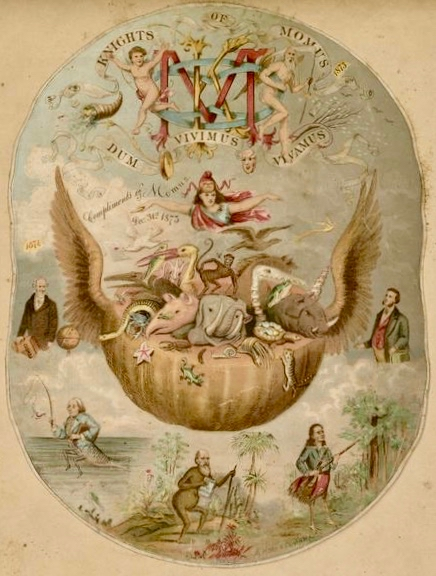
- Abbreviation: KoM
- Named after: Momus
- Formation: 1871; 155 years ago
- Founded at: New Orleans, LA.
- Type: Carnival Krewe
- Location: New Orleans, LA.

The Knights of Momus (KoM) was founded in 1872 and was the second-oldest parading Old Line Krewe in New Orleans Carnival after the Mistick Krewe of Comus and is the third oldest krewe to continuously present a tableau ball, after the Twelfth Night Revelers in 1870.

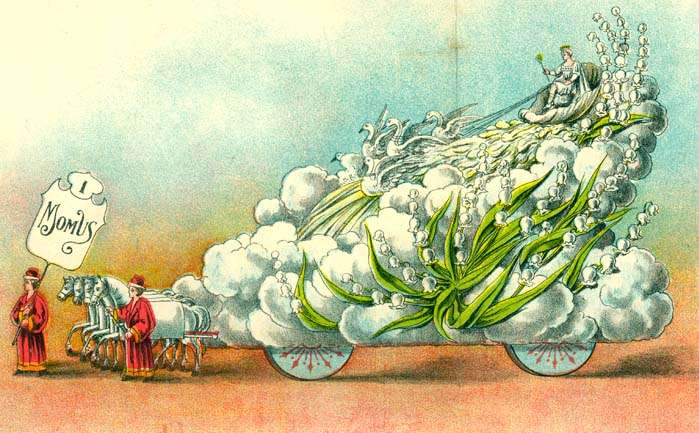
New Orleans Mardi Gras, 1907. Illustration showing King's float for Momus parade.

For over 100 years, the Momus parade was a fixture of the New Orleans Mardi Gras parade schedule, parading annually on the Thursday before Fat Tuesday. Since Momus was the Greek god of mockery, the themes of Momus parades typically paid homage to the organization's namesake with irreverent humor and biting satire. The 1877 parade theme, "Hades, A Dream of Momus," caused an uproar when it took aim at the Reconstruction government established in New Orleans after the Civil War. Attempts at retribution by local authorities were largely unsuccessful due to the secrecy of the membership.

In 1991, New Orleans City Council member Dorothy Mae Taylor passed an ordinance that required social organizations, including Mardi Gras Krewes, to certify publicly that they did not discriminate on the basis of race, gender, handicap, or sexual orientation, in order to obtain parade permits and other public licensure. In effect, the ordinance required these, and other, private social groups to desegregate. Momus was one of three historic krewes (with the Mistick Krewe of 1857 and KoP of 1882) that withdrew from parading rather than comply.

Two federal courts later declared that the ordinance was an unconstitutional infringement on First Amendment rights of free association, and an unwarranted intrusion on the privacy of the groups subject to the ordinance. The Supreme Court refused to hear the city's appeal from this decision. Nevertheless, the Momus parade never returned to the streets of New Orleans, although the group still conducts an annual bal masqué on the Thursday before Mardi Gras.

== The Louisiana Debating and Literary Association a.k.a. The Louisiana Club ==
Much like The Pickwick Club was founded as the public facade of The Mistick Krewe, The Louisiana Literary and Debating Society was founded as the public facade of Knights of Momus. Unlike The Pickwick Club/Mistick Krewe relationship, the Knights of Momus and The Louisiana Club are still highly intact, much like the Stratford Club and the High Priests of Mithras. Unlike The Boston Club or The Pickwick Club, the Louisiana Club is completely closed, and will not admit anyone through its portals that is not a member. It is rumored most of the club is related.

== Gallery ==
=== Floats and costumes ===
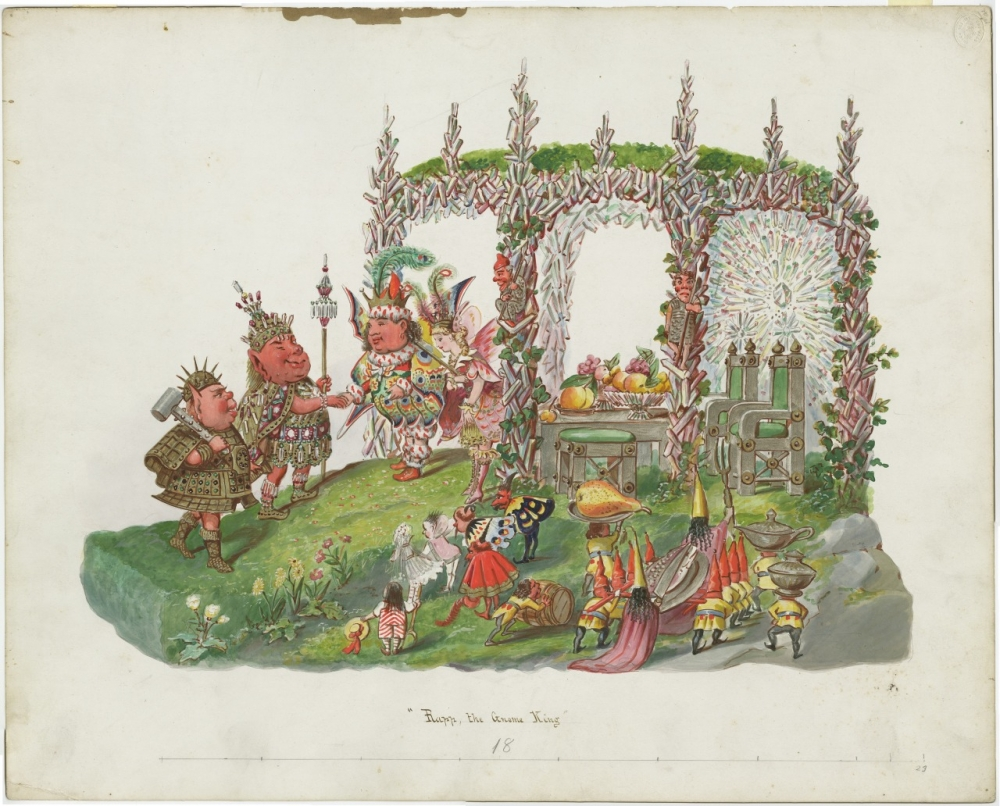
Rapp the Gnome King 1878

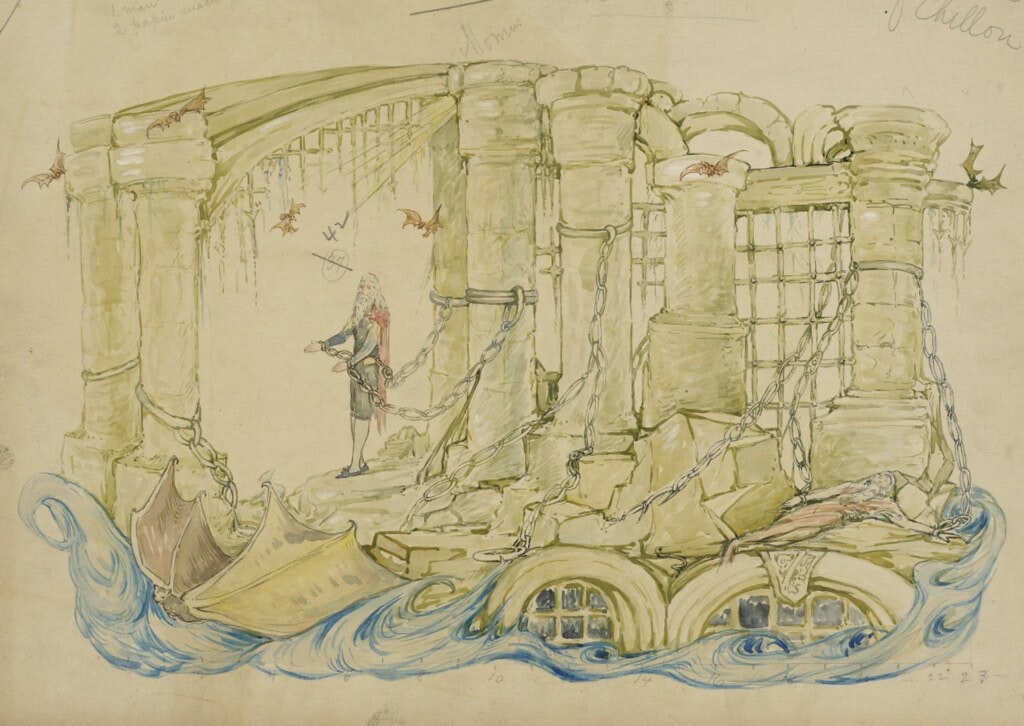
The Prisoner of Chillion 1902

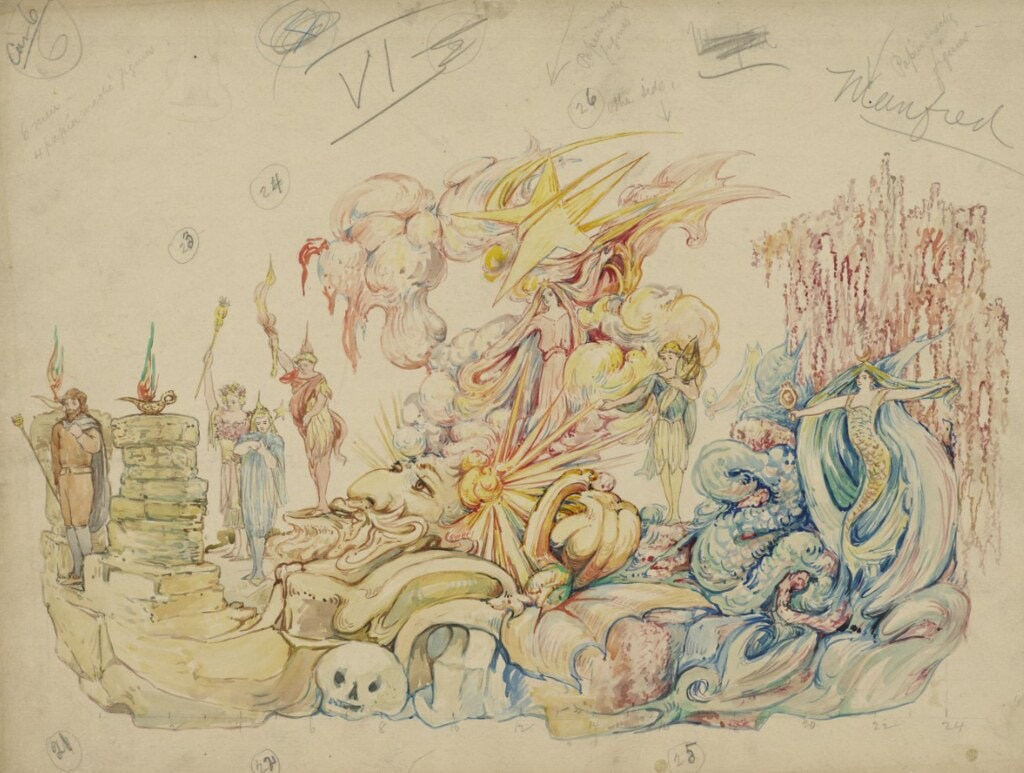
The Vision of Manfred 1902

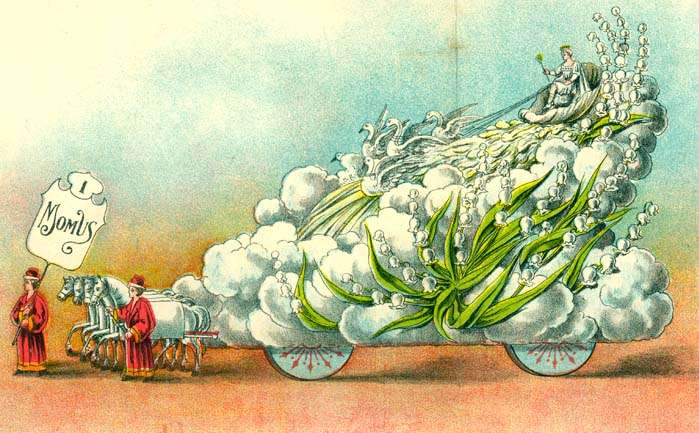
MOMUS 1907

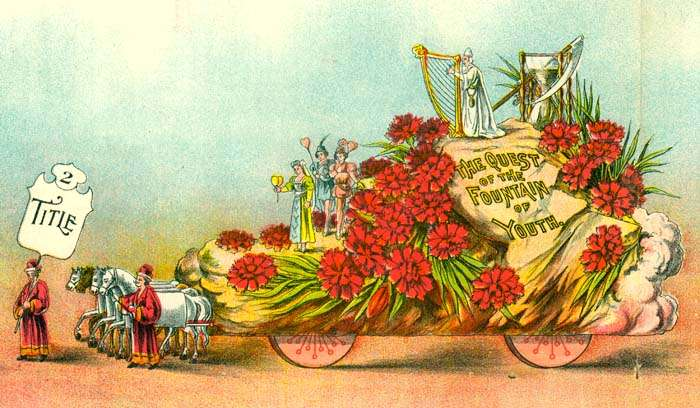
Title 1907

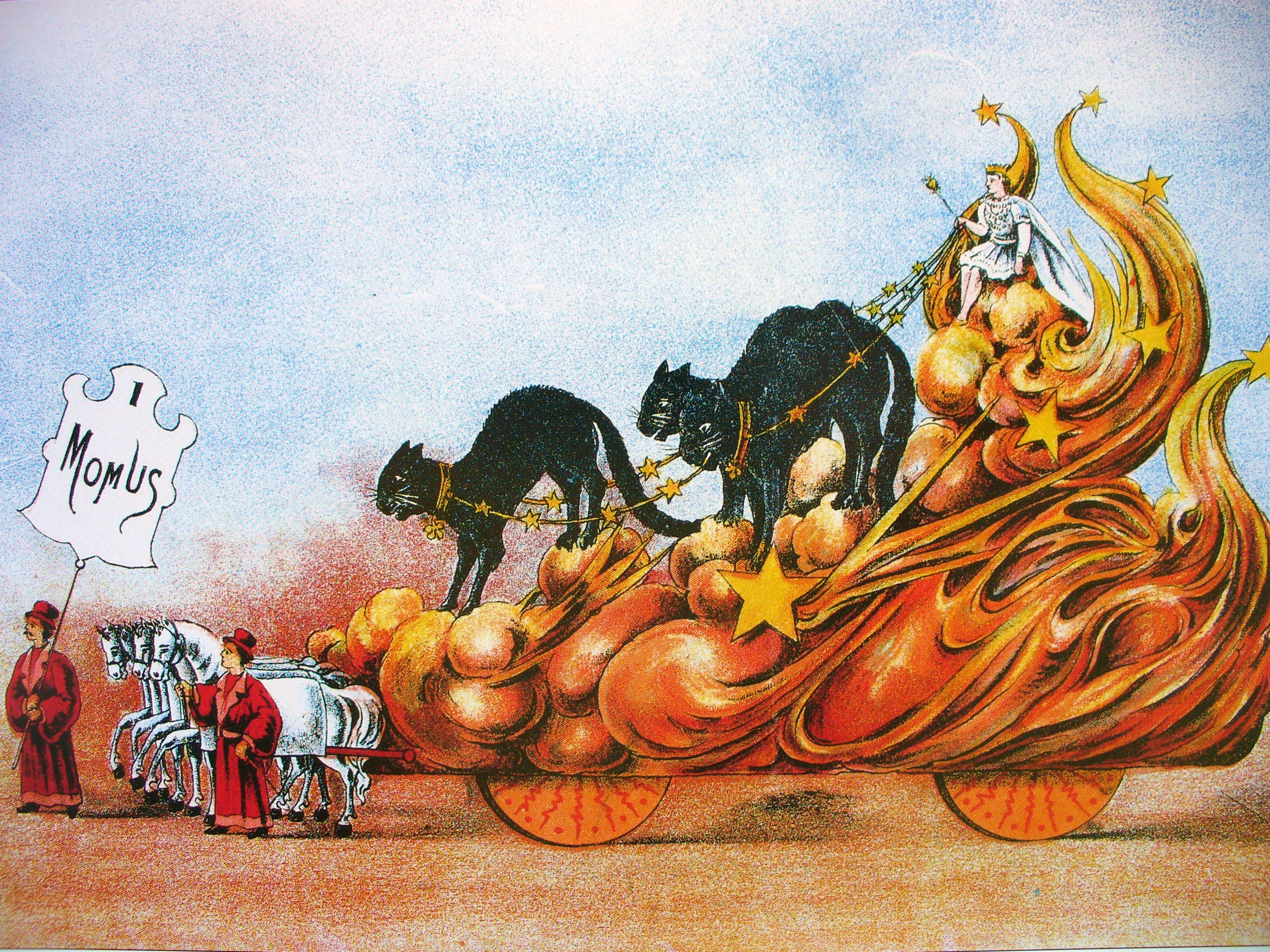
Black Cats 1909

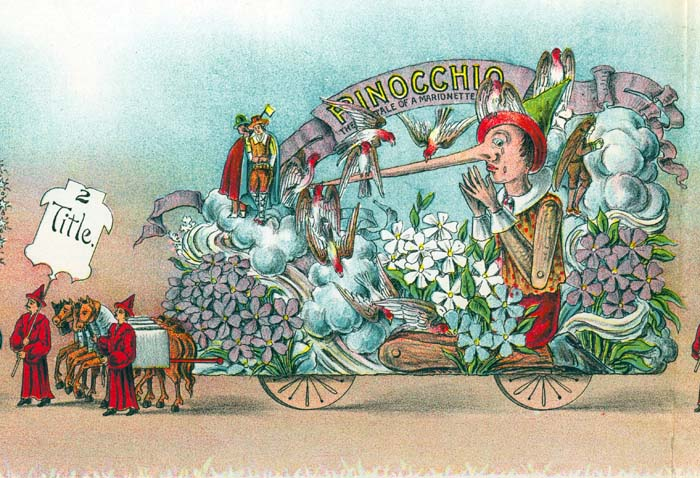
Pinoochio 1916

=== Invitations ===
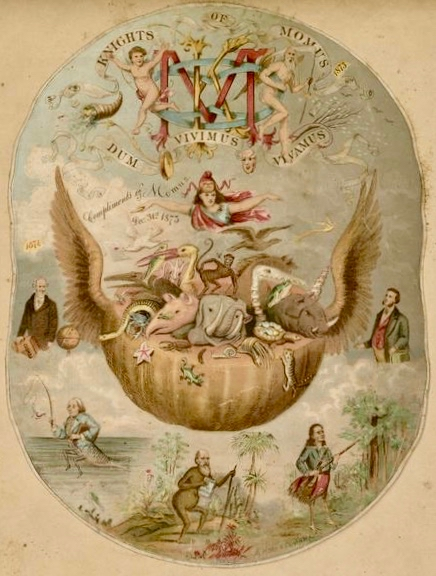
1873

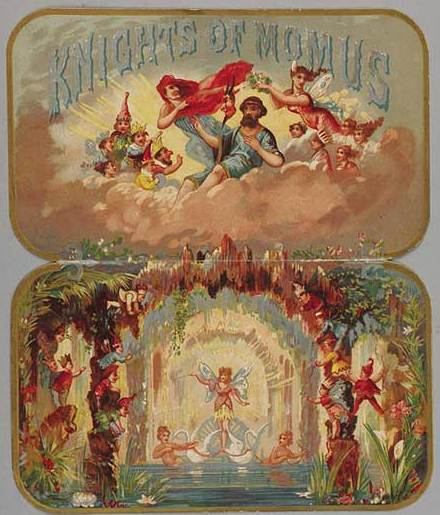
1878

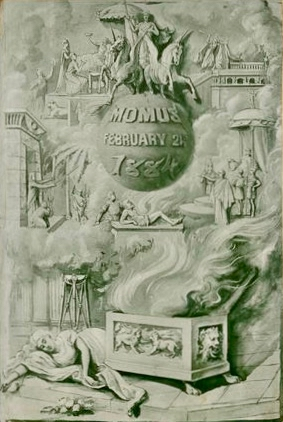
1884

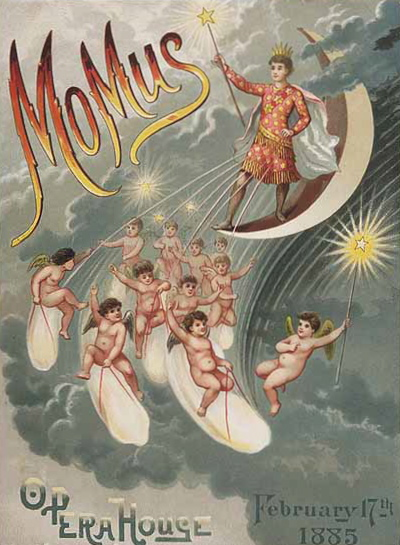
1885

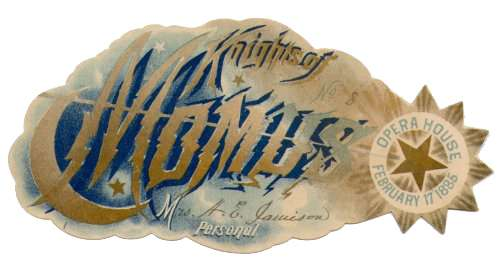
1885

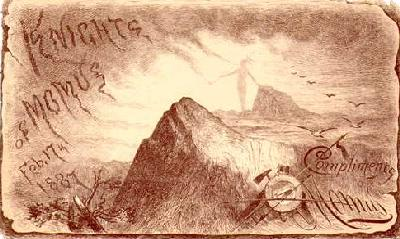
1887

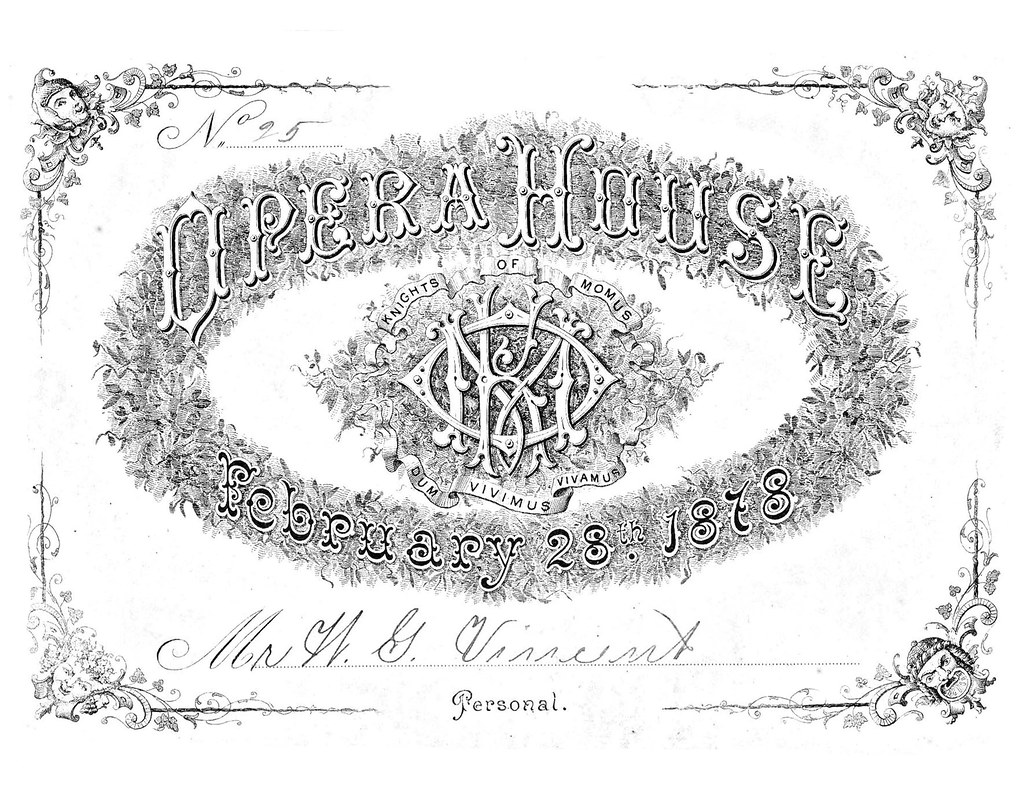
1878 Admittance Card

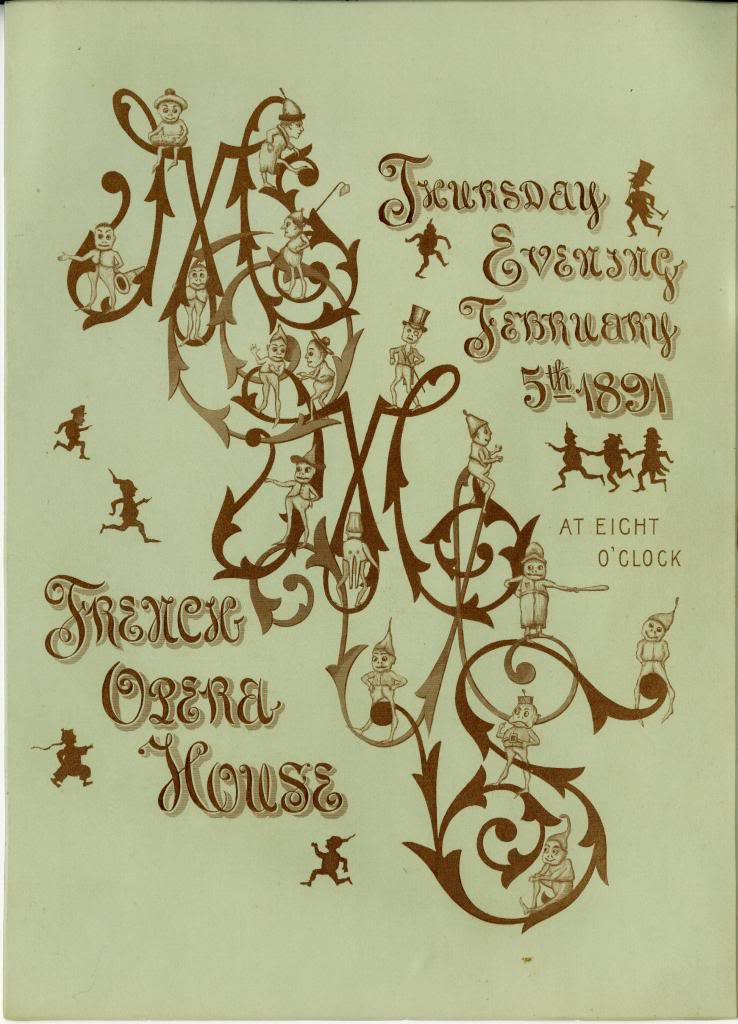
1891

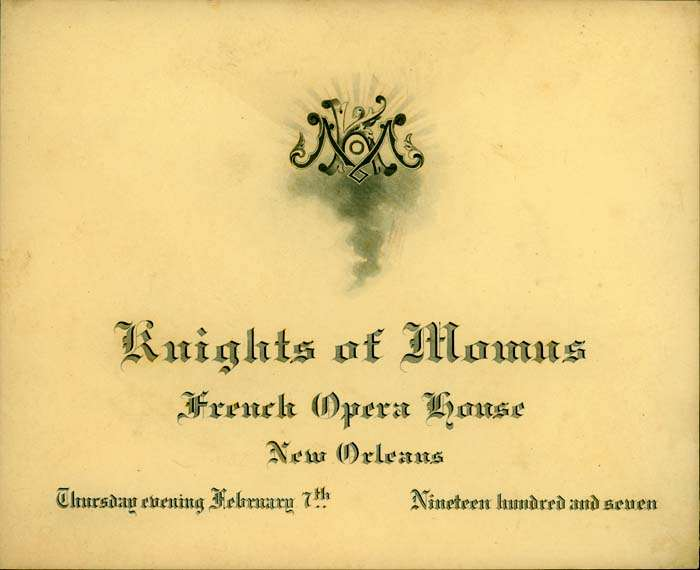
1907

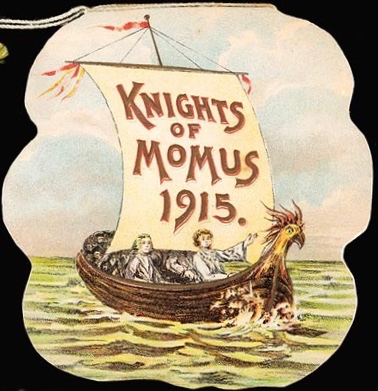
1915 Dance Card

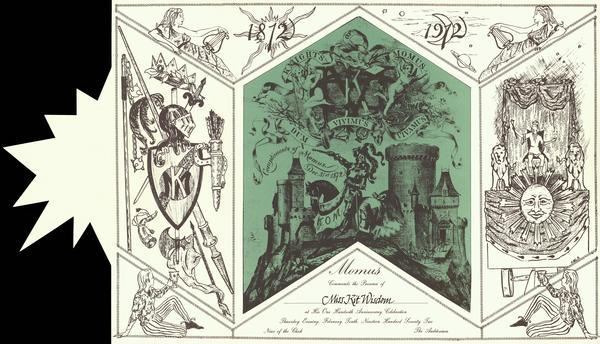
1972

=== Bulletin ===
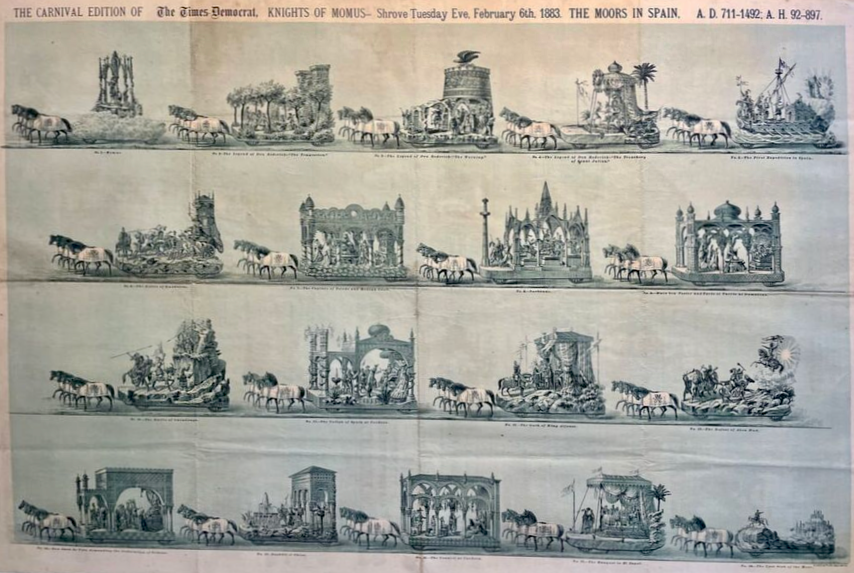
1883

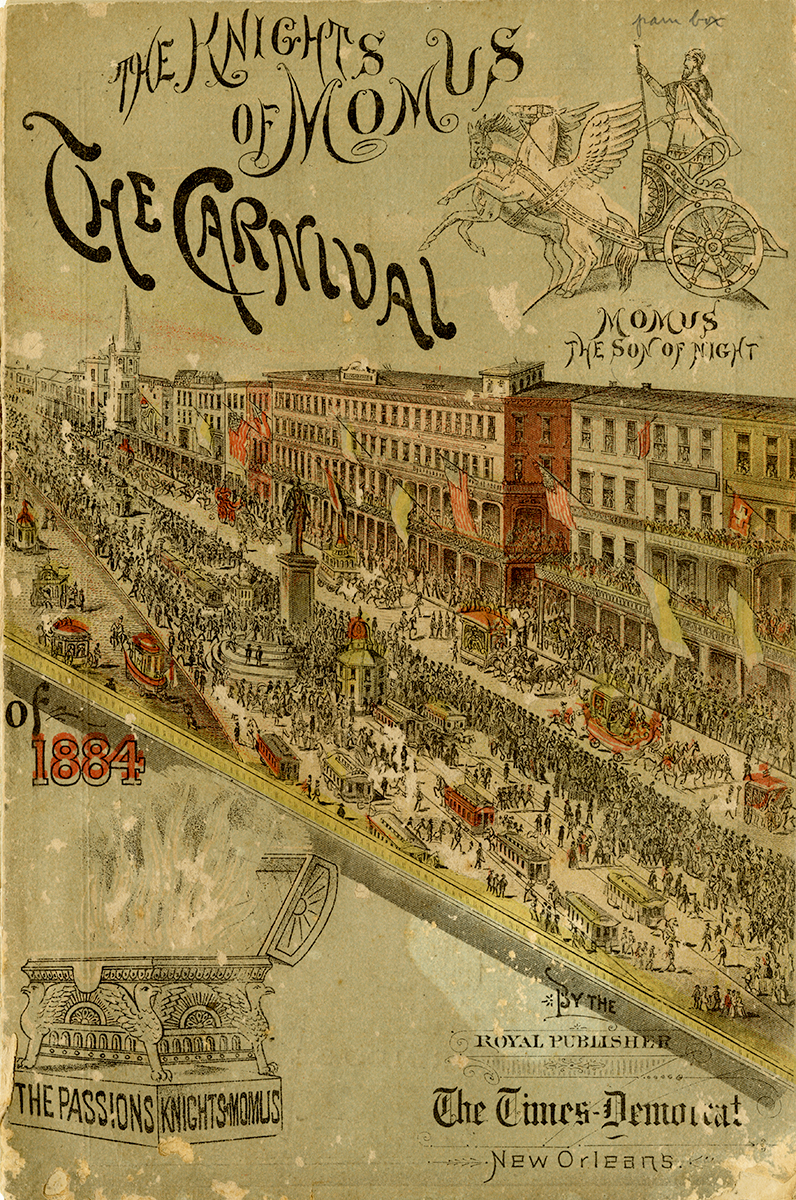
1884

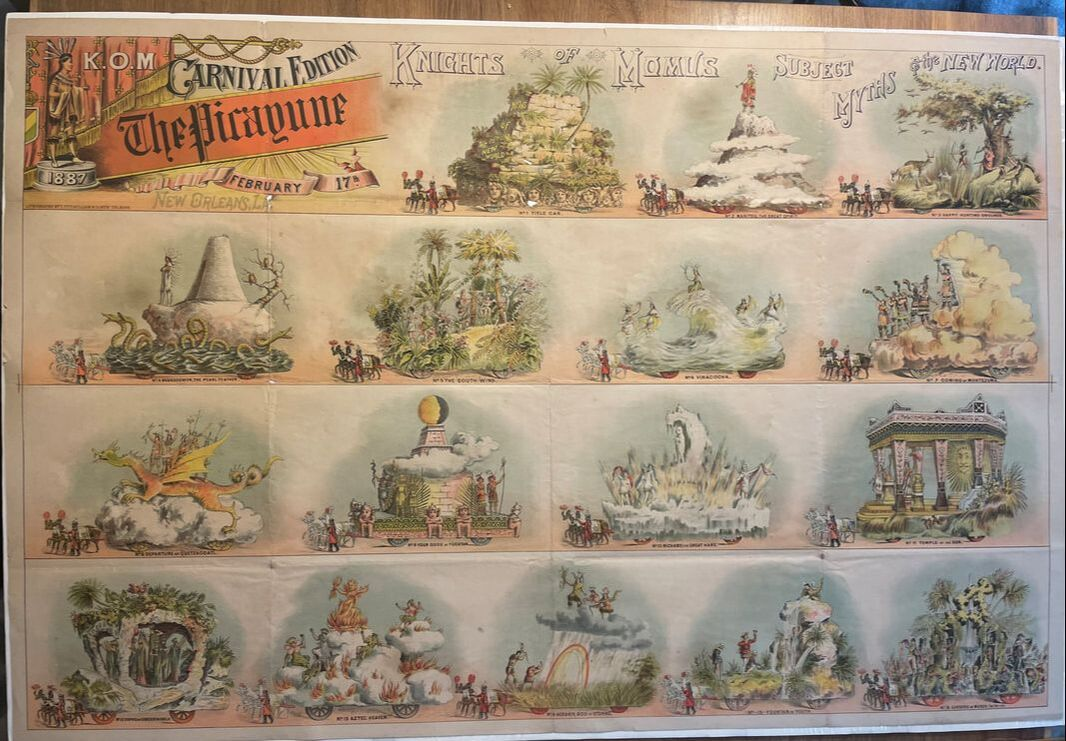
1887

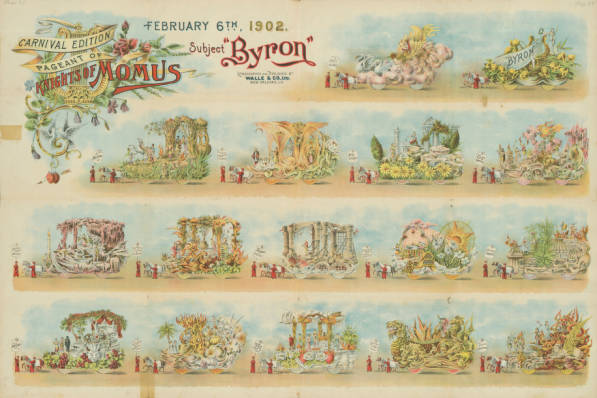
1902 Byron

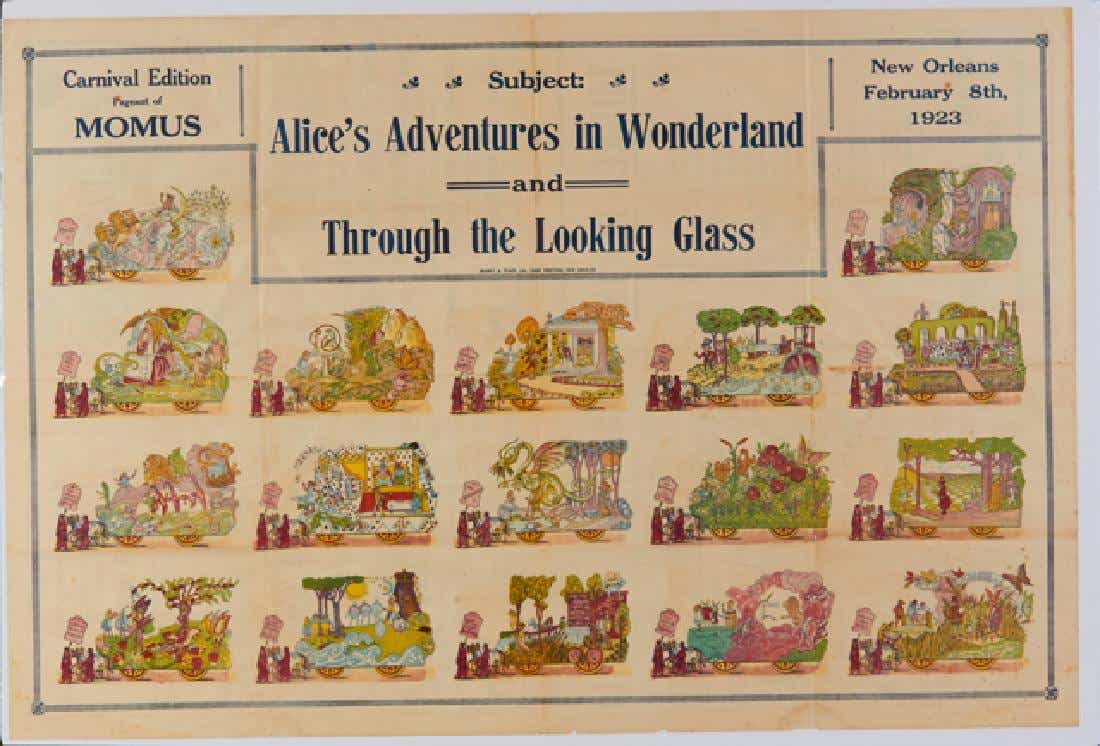
1923 Through the Looking Glass

=== Parade ===
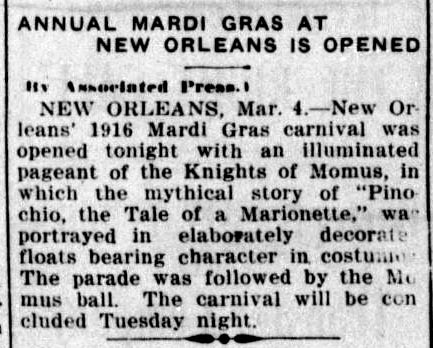
1916

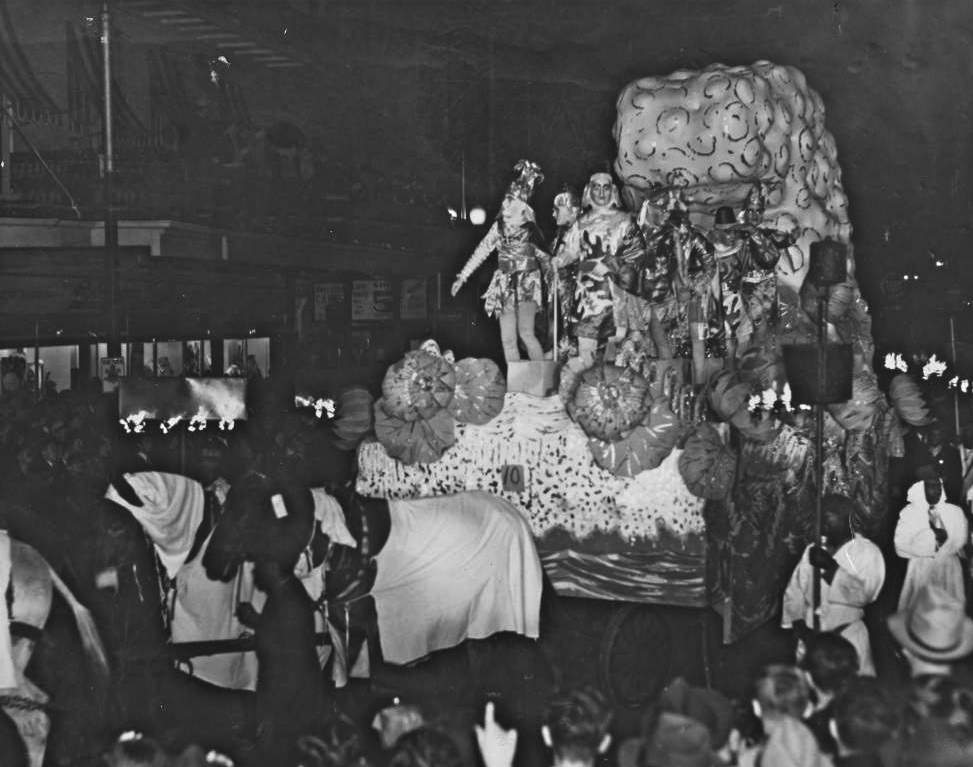
1938

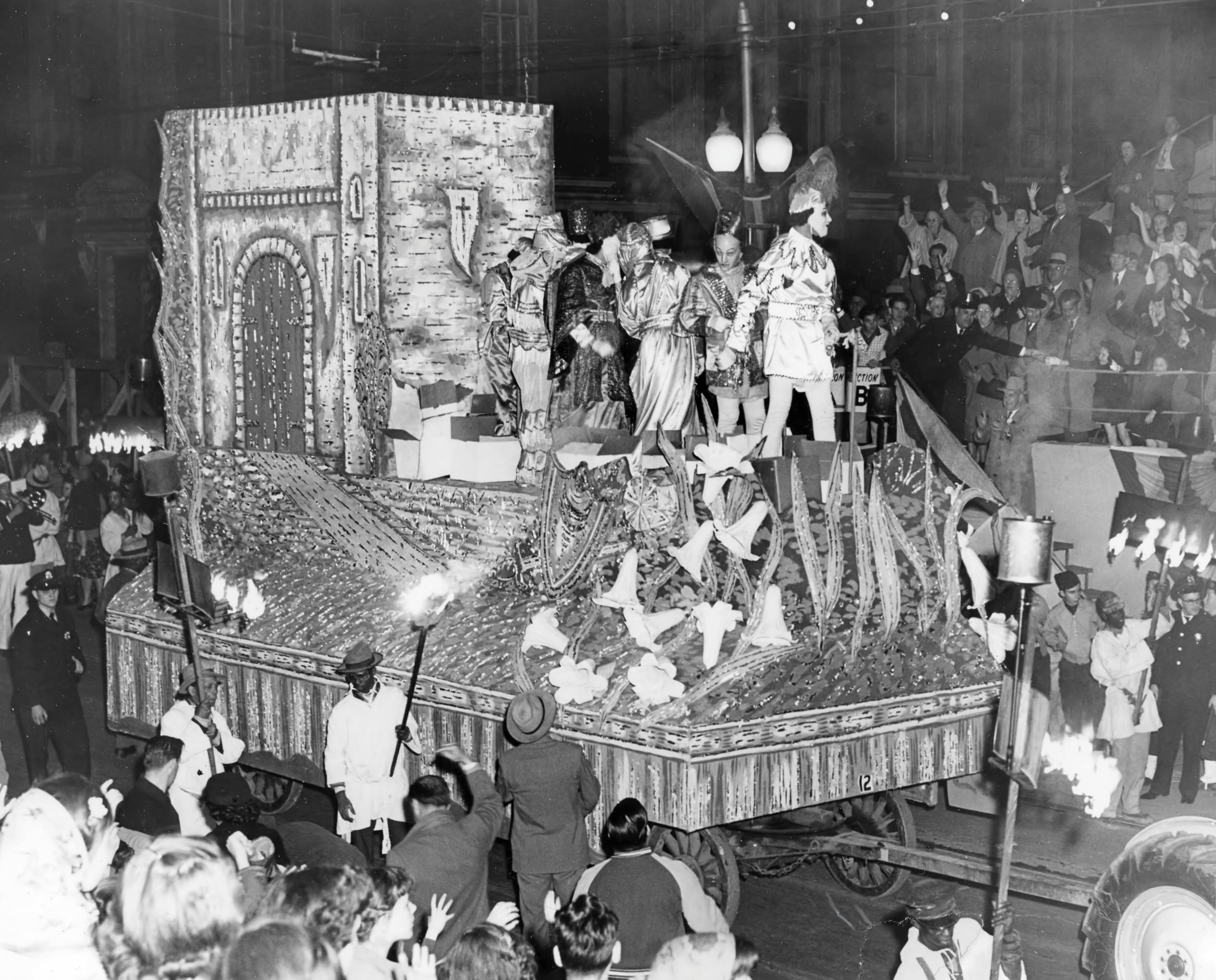
1953

=== Program ===
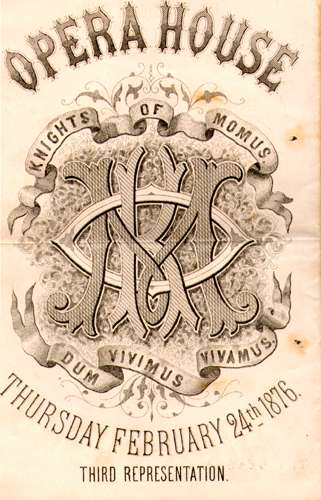
1876

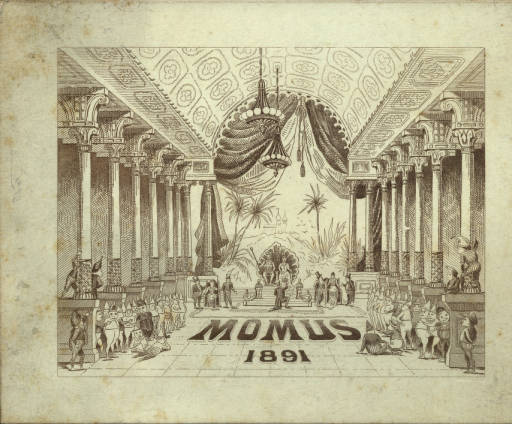
1891

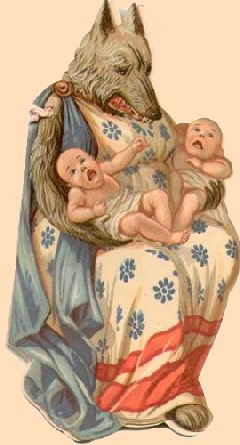
1896

== Galveston ==
The Knights of Momus ("KOM") were a Mardi Gras society in Galveston, Texas, founded in 1871. The original Knights of Momus went defunct around the time of World War II. A new group was founded in the mid-1980s, and seeking to rekindle the spirit of the original group, adopted the Momus name. The group was named after the Greek god Momus.

== See also ==
- Knights of Chaos
- Twelfth Night Revelers
- The Louisiana Club
- Mistick Krewe
- Mardi Gras in New Orleans
