= Christopher Hemmeter =

American real estate developer (1939–2003)

Christopher Hemmeter (October 8, 1939 – November 27, 2003) was an American real estate developer who pioneered the concept of destination resorts in Hawaii and was involved in gambling development of casinos, primarily in New Orleans and Colorado.

== Real estate development ==
Christopher Hemmeter was born in 1939 in Washington, D.C., and grew up in Los Altos in the San Francisco Bay area. After attending Cornell University and graduating first in his class in 1962 he moved to Hawaii and got a job as a management trainee at the Sheraton Royal Hawaiian.

Hemmeter's development career began in the 1960s when he partnered with Henry Shigekane and Diane Plotts to develop resorts in Hawaii. Projects he was involved with included developing the Westin Kauai, Hyatt Regency Waikiki, Hyatt Regency Waikoloa and the Westin Maui. Hemmeter's signature "...is best known for the extreme – some would say outrageous – lavishness of the Hawaii hotels he built in the 1980's." When the Westin Kauai (a redevelopment of the old Kauai Surf Hotel) opened in September, 1987, suites cost up to $1,800 and rooms ran double the island's average at $180 per night. The hotel was set in 560 acres (2.3 km^{2}) and boasted two golf courses and a 2-acre (8,100 m^{2}) reflecting pool, adding to the reported $775 million development cost.

The Hyatt Regency Waikoloa (now the Hilton Waikoloa Village) opened in 1988, with a ceremony that was attended by a veritable “Who’s Who of Hawaii” along with celebrities including Dionne Warwick and Burt Bacharach who performed at the event.

At a cost of $360 million, the Hyatt was reportedly the most expensive hotel ever built at the time, and changed the way resorts would be built not only in Hawaii but around the world.

Featured guest, author James Michener, wrote of the event, “It’s the kind of place God would have built if he had sufficient cash flow.”

Former Hawaii Governor Ben Cayetano called Hemmeter, "...a man of great vision and energy, More than anyone else, he changed the nature of resort development in Hawai'i. The four- and five-star hotels on the Big Island and Maui are the products of his work." In 1988 he ranked 389th on the Forbes Wealthiest American list.

In September 1987 Hemmeter made a $100 million bid for Hawaiian Airlines which was accepted, but which was withdrawn in December of that year after the October 19th stock market crash.

== Casinos ==
Hemmeter returned to the mainland in 1991 when he began to develop casino gaming projects. His biggest project was a proposed $1 billion casino in New Orleans. Billed at the time as "the world's largest casino". The original design resembled Monte Carlo's 1861 casino, intending to evoke the New Orleans 1885 Cotton Exposition and Chicago's 1893 World Columbia Exposition. The developers estimated the casino would attract one million additional visitors to the city and would generate annual revenues of as much as $780 million, estimates that were based in part on the proven success of dockside gaming in the Mississippi Gulf Coast area.

In 1993 a partnership of Hemmeter and Caesars World obtained the lease on the Rivergate property, which by law was the only place the land-based casino could be built in Louisiana, beating out a rival bid by Harrah's. In August, 1993, however, the State Casino Board awarded the state's sole casino license to Harrah's and not the Hemmeter-Caesar's partnership. The impasse of one company owning the only license and another owning the only lease was resolved when the two entities formed a joint venture under pressure from then-Governor Edwin Edwards. The new entity, known as "Harrah's Jazz" established a temporary casino in the Municipal Auditorium in order to establish a cash flow while the main facility was under construction at the Rivergate. The temporary facility opened in May, 1995 and a week later was closed due to a flood. The poor location of the site resulted in the actual gaming take falling 60% below projections at only $13.1 million per month. Equally concerning was that 60% of gamers at the temporary facility were locals and not out-of-town tourists, undercutting the economic benefit backers hoped gaming to provide to the tourist industry.

Harrah's Jazz halted construction on the permanent facility at 3 am the day before Thanksgiving, 1995 and laid off 1,600 construction workers, 2,500 casino employees, and filed for bankruptcy. Later, the project was taken over by Harrah's who built the Harrah's New Orleans Casino on the site of Hemmeter's project. He also saw failures of his New Orleans riverboat projects and Colorado gaming property, Bullwackers. Hemmeter filed personal bankruptcy in 1997.

== World Football League ==
In 1974, Hemmeter was granted a franchise in the fledgling World Football League. This team, known as The Hawaiians, represented a serious attempt at a viable professional football organization. Hemmeter was one of the few owners who was reasonably well financed.

After a financially disastrous first season, Hemmeter replaced league founder Gary L. Davidson as the league's commissioner. Hew proposed a plan of restructuring for the league which was known as the Hemmeter Plan. The plan was intended to bring a measure of fiscal sanity to the league. It restructured players' salaries to a $500 per game minimum with a profit sharing arrangement with the teams, and a fresh cash infusion from the team owners. Ultimately, those efforts were brought undone when a failed effort to sign Joe Namath for the Chicago Winds caused television partner TVS to back out. The lack of a national television contract, combined with the league's already damaged reputation, resulted in the league folding in the middle of the 1975 season.

== Other business interests ==
- Founder & Chairman of the Bank of Honolulu
- Director, First Hawaiian Bank
- Director, Morrison-Knudsen
- Director, Resort Income Investors

== Personal ==
Hemmeter was friends with former President Jimmy Carter and hosted both him and President Ronald Reagan at his various homes. He originated the design concept for the Jimmy Carter Library and Museum.

Hemmeter was diagnosed with liver cancer shortly before he died of the disease and had been dealing with Parkinson's disease as well. He died at his home in Brentwood, California.

Hemmeter was married to his wife, Patricia for 25 years.

According to Anthony Robbins, writing in one of his bestselling books, and who was acquainted with Hemmeter, the latter's house in Hawaii built in the 1980s "defied verbal description", and cost tens of millions of dollars, while even the front door cost $1M.

== Awards ==
Hemmeter received the following awards:

- Businessman of the Year (Hawaii)
- Salesperson of the Year (Hawaii)
- Marketing Man of the Year (Hawaii)
- Islander of the Year (Hawaii)
- Independent Hotelier of the World (1991)

== Charitable work ==
Hemmeter was active in a number of charities, including:

- Director, Carter Center
- Director, National Symphony Orchestra (Washington, D.C.)
- Trustee, Punahou School (Hawaii)
- Member, Young Presidents Organization
- Trustee Fellow, Cornell University
