= Krewe of Boo =

Krewe of Boo is New Orleans' official Halloween Parade krewe. The parade was created by Mardi Gras World owner and founder Blaine Kern Sr. It is now a major parade that passes through much of the French Quarter near the French market. Krewe members/performers must be at least 18 years of age, though children are welcome along the parade route at the discretion of their parents or guardians.

== History ==
The inaugural parade was held on Halloween night 2008 in conjunction with grand opening celebrations at the newly opened Eastbank location of Mardi Gras World located at the former River City Casino riverboat terminal. Kern, the founder of the krewe, wanted a traditional parade route uptown. However, Mayor Ray Nagin urged Kern to hold the parade downtown to increase tourist involvement.

== Activities ==
Many local nightclubs and businesses in the area sponsor Halloween-themed parade floats, which throw beads, candy and other novelty merchandise like Krewe of Boo cups to the crowds. Marching bands and dance troupes perform in-between the floats. Both performers and visitors wear lavish Halloween costumes. The parade is seen as a precursor to Mardi Gras to which it is more age-acceptable to bring children.
