= Mardi Gras World =

Tourist attraction in New Orleans, Louisiana, U.S.

Coordinates: 29.9351°N 90.0615°W

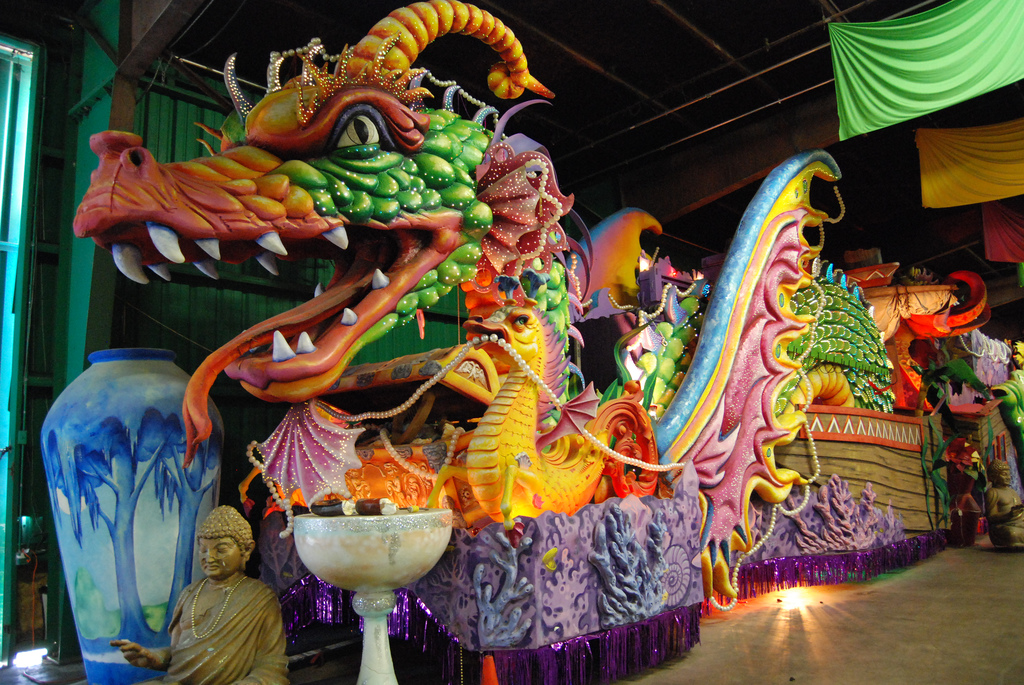
Leviathan float, Krewe of Orpheus, Mardi Gras World

Mardi Gras World (also known as Blaine Kern's Mardi Gras World, MGW) is a tourist attraction located in New Orleans. Guests tour the 300,000 square foot working warehouse where floats are made for Mardi Gras parades in New Orleans, Louisiana. Mardi Gras World is located along the Mississippi River, next to the New Orleans Morial Convention Center. Their events venue, the River City Complex, also hosts festivals, weddings, private parties and corporate events.

== History ==
In 1946, Blaine Kern, Sr. founded Blaine Kern Artists. Kern came from a family of float builders, but began creating floats after 1947, when a surgeon and krewe captain who had seen a mural by Kern hired him to create floats for the Krewe of Alla. Kern's business expanded from there. Kern, who traveled to Europe to learn float building techniques, has gained an international reputation in float building, with floats beyond New Orleans for Las Vegas, Mobile, Galveston, Montreal and the Universal Studios Mardi Gras parade.

In 1984, Mardi Gras World was created as a tourist attraction to show visitors a behind-the-scenes look at float building.

In 2008, Mardi Gras World expanded to a second 300,000-square-foot (28,000 m^{2}) facility, compared to the 80,000-square-foot (7,400 m^{2}) original facility in Algiers, in the former River City Casino.

== In popular culture ==
Mardi Gras World has appeared on multiple seasons of Top Chef. During the finale of Top Chef: New York, the five finalists arrived at Mardi Gras World to learn their elimination challenge from host Padma Lakshmi. In Top Chef: New Orleans, the Algiers warehouse was the site of the season's kitchen, and the River City Complex was the site of a Halloween party hosted by Lea Michele. Mardi Gras World was the site of the final task of The Amazing Race 32.

== See also ==
- Kern Studios
