= Knights of Babylon =

- Abbreviation: KoB
- Named after: Babylon
- Formation: 1939; 87 years ago
- Type: Carnival Krewe
- Location: New Orleans, LA.
- Members: 250
- Website: knightsofbabylon.org

Knights of Babylon is a New Orleans Mardi Gras krewe that was founded in 1939.

== Parade ==
The Knights of Babylon parade on Jeudi Gras, the Thursday night prior to Mardi Gras. The Knights of Babylon Parade rolls annually on its traditional Uptown New Orleans parade route. Babylon is always the first parade on this evening, leading the way for the other Thursday parades, and blazing the trail for Carnival weekend festivities.

Its route starts at the intersection of Magazine Street and Napoleon Avenue, turning right toward downtown at St. Charles Avenue. It travels downtown on St. Charles Avenue past Lee Circle and onward to Canal Street where the parade disbands in front of the Marriott Hotel. Following the parade, Babylon's invitation-only tableau ball and supper dance are held at the Marriott Hotel. Originally, the traditional tableau and ball had been staged at the Municipal Auditorium until 2005, when this facility sustained extensive hurricane damage, prompting the organization to move the ball to an alternate venue.

The Knights of Babylon are one of the few krewes left that utilize the traditional hand-held flambeaux to light the parade route on foot.

== Parade History ==
Babylon has focused on adhering to some of the oldest Carnival traditions. Their floats have the same basic designs and dimensions that they did at the krewe's inception more than 75 years ago, and the King's Float is mule drawn. Additionally, in keeping with the tenets of a mystic krewe, the organization requires all riders to remain masked throughout the entire duration of the parade. Unlike many Carnival organizations that rent floats, the Knights of Babylon own all of their floats and the den that houses them.

Originally, Babylon's parade and attendant parade-day festivities were held on the Wednesday before Mardi Gras. The Krewe of Momus, which historically paraded on Thursday evening, stopped parading in 1992, and, as a result, in 1993, Babylon moved its parade and tableau ball to the Thursday immediately before Mardi Gras. Babylon is the first of the three uptown parades on this night, leading the way into the festivities of the weekend before Mardi Gras. The Knights of Babylon are proud to uphold the traditions of Carnival on this festive evening. As many locals say, “CARNIVAL BEGINS WHEN BABYLON ROLLS!"

=== Parade themes ===
- 1940 Travelogue
- 1941 Capricious Nature
- 1942 No Parade - World War II
- 1943 No Parade - World War II
- 1944 No Parade - World War II
- 1945 No Parade - World War II
- 1946 No Parade - World War II
- 1947 The Arts
- 1948 Fancy's Flight
- 1949 The Sciences
- 1950 The Marches
- 1951 Historical Highlights
- 1952 Contributions to Civilization
- 1953 Fabulous Festivals
- 1954 Tales: Old, Ever New
- 1955 Masks
- 1956 The Theatre
- 1957 Makers of History
- 1958 Scenes from the Opera
- 1959 Arts through the Ages
- 1960 Alice in Wonderland
- 1961 Rogues and Renegades
- 1962 The Musical Theater
- 1963 Hans Christian Anderson
- 1964 Le Ballet
- 1965 Poems of Youth
- 1966 Benjamin Franklin
- 1967 Behind the Golden Curtain
- 1968 Gone are the Days
- 1969 Don Quixote
- 1970 Around the World in Eighty Days
- 1971 The Student Prince
- 1972 Peer Gynt
- 1973 Aida
- 1974 Anna and the King Siam
- 1975 Robin Hood
- 1976 Commander Matthew C. Perry
- 1977 The Little Glass Slipper
- 1978 Mozart
- 1979 Henry VIII
- 1980 Babes in Toyland
- 1981 Tevye's Tales
- 1982 Snow White
- 1983 Kismet
- 1984 Once and Future King
- 1985 Desert Song
- 1986 The Matchmaker
- 1987 Oklahoma
- 1988 The Trapp Family Singers
- 1989 The Golden years
- 1990 Pygmalion
- 1991 Oliver Twist
- 1992 Carmen
- 1993 Naughty Marietta
- 1994 New Moon
- 1995 Music Man
- 1996 Gigi
- 1997 South Pacific
- 1998 Yankee Doodle Boy
- 1999 For the Love of Opera
- 2000 L’histoire de Notre Heritage Francais
- 2001 Wonderful Land of Oz
- 2002 Guys and Dolls
- 2003 Sauntering Through Sondheim
- 2004 The Pirates of Penzance
- 2005 A Frolic in Fairyland
- 2006 Out from Under
- 2007 The Chinese Expeditions
- 2008 The Babylonian Sky
- 2009 Living Jewels
- 2010 Masks of Men
- 2011 Babylonian Birthstones
- 2012 The Queen's Diamond Jubilee
- 2013 The Land of Dreams
- 2014 Thanks for the Memories
- 2015 Babylonian Pantheon
- 2016 Enchantments and Transformations
- 2017 The Lure & Legends of Gold
- 2018 Gifts of the Gods to New Orleans
- 2019 Winged Wonders
- 2020 Mythological Menagerie
- 2021 No Parade - COVID-19 Pandemic
- 2022 Once Upon a Time
- 2023 Wonders of the World
- 2024 Rubáiyát of Omar Khayyám
- 2025 Just So Stories
- 2026 A Knight at the Opera

=== Royal court ===
The Knights of Babylon annually present a royal court including a King Sargon of Akkad, Sargon's Queen, Sargon's royal pages, the queen's royal pages, ladies in waiting, princesses, and royal maids. The identity of King Sargon is kept secret and is never revealed.

=== Iconic floats ===
- Sargon is the first float of the parade and carries Sargon the Magnificent, the annually selected king of the krewe, and four royal pages. The float is pulled by mule and is made entirely of papier-mâché.
- The Carrollton Streetcar carries the officers of the Knights of Babylon. The float pays homage to the oldest continuously running streetcar line in the United States.
- Hanging Gardens of Babylon are one of the Seven Wonders of the Ancient World. Built to please the king's wife, the fabled Hanging Gardens garnered global fame and adorned the palace of Nebuchadnezzar.
- Gates of Ishtar are the main gates that open to the ancient city of Babylon.
- The Babylonian Barge is modeled after the barges used on the Nile River by the Babylonians and debuted in 2014.
- The Jester's Float traditionally carries young knights of the krewe. The Jesters Float was named in honor of the Jesters Club, the parent club of the Knights of Babylon.

=== Throws ===
Trinkets, collectables, masks, and beads tossed by hand from riders of the floats are called throws. Collectible throws from the Knights of Babylon include the light up necklaces, light up jester beads, light up streetcar necklace, and jester hats.
