= River City Casino (New Orleans) =

Casino complex in Louisiana, USA

Coordinates: 29.9329°N 90.0613°W

River City Casino was a twin riverboat casino complex (Grand Palais and Crescent City Queen) in New Orleans, Louisiana, located one block upriver from New Orleans Morial Convention Center.

It was the brainchild of Christopher Hemmeter (operating the Grand Palais riverboat) with a 50/50 joint venture with Capital Gaming International (operating the Crescent City Queen riverboat). The two riverboat complex partially circumvented Louisiana state law (repealed in 2001) requiring riverboat gaming vessels to make the required 90-minute cruise once every three-hour period weather permitting. There would always be at least one vessel docked while the other would sail so patrons would never have to wait in line to board a gaming vessel. The riverboats opened for only nine weeks from March 29 - June 13, 1995. The terminal building complex was still in the ongoing interior construction phase when casino revenue was far below projections, additional funding was not secured and work was abruptly halted with construction tools, blueprints and materials left in place.

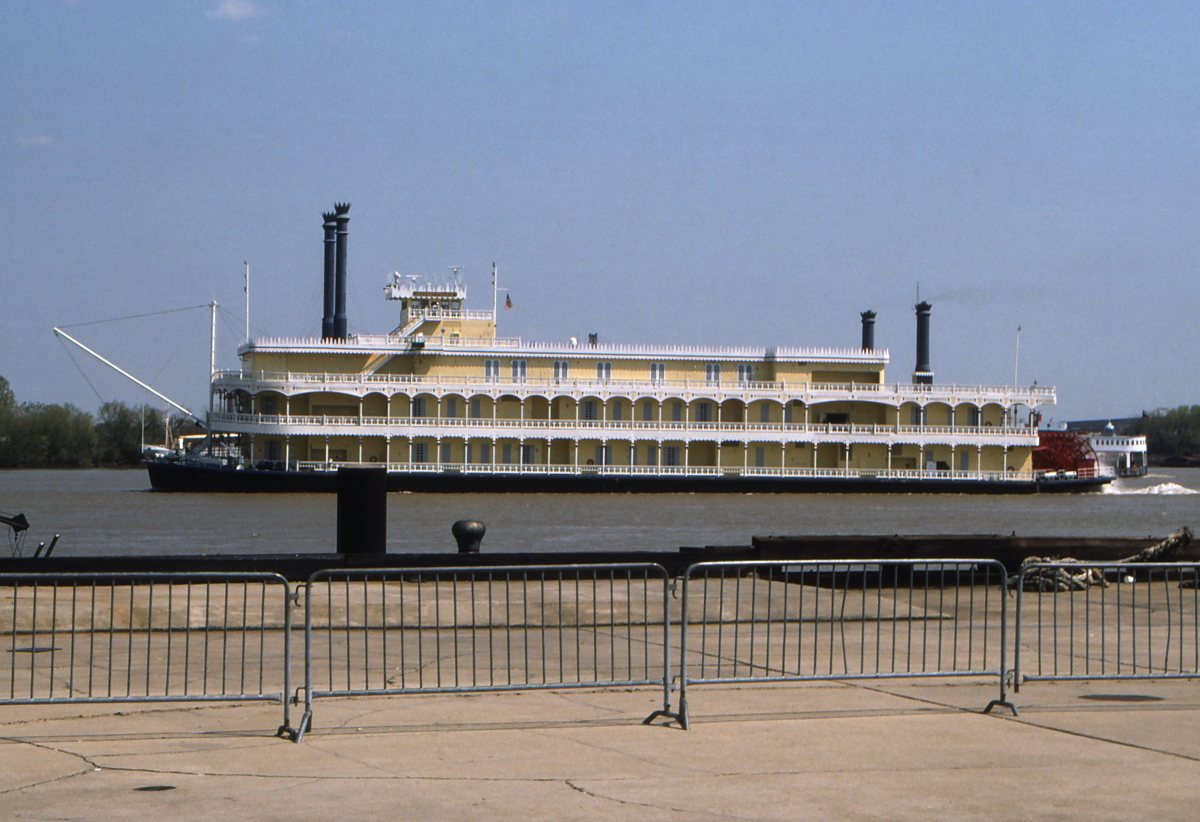
"Crescent City Queen" Riverboat at New Orleans 1996

== Bankruptcy ==
The riverboats and its licenses were eventually sold off and transferred to other companies. Isle of Capri in Lake Charles acquired the Grand Palais (with license) in 1996. Isle's parent company, Casino America paid $55 million for the Grand Palais Riverboat in January 1996, with a package of cash, notes, stock, warrants, and by assuming $10 million of Grand Palais' existing liabilities. Boomtown New Orleans acquired the Crescent City Queen riverboat without license in 1998 (renamed as Boomtown Belle II) to replace the smaller Boomtown Belle riverboat. Crescent City Queen's gaming license was transferred in 1996 to Casino Magic, which then operated a docked riverboat casino in Bossier City, later renamed Boomtown Bossier City. Boomtown's parent company, Pinnacle Entertainment revived the River City Casino name for its newest property in the St. Louis, Missouri area when it opened in March 2010.

== Current status of riverboat terminal complex ==
After being shuttered since its closure in June 1995, the terminal building complex was leased by Mardi Gras World owner Barry Kern in early 2008 and became one of the venue offerings of Mardi Gras World (New Orleans tour attraction and events venue). The lease more than quadrupled Mardi Gras World's event space. After more than 13 years of dormancy, the River City Complex finally saw new life during the Krewe of Boo inaugural parade on Halloween night 2008. It was also the site of the Gulf Aid benefit concert with Lenny Kravitz as the headlining act during the BP oil spill crisis on May 16, 2010. Since then, the River City Complex has become New Orleans' premiere event venue and has hosted events for the NFL, Microsoft, Lexus and more.

== In popular culture ==
The Crescent City Queen riverboat was featured in an episode of the USA Network TV series The Big Easy in 1996 while it was still docked at the shuttered River City Casino terminal complex. The interior of the CCQ was also used in the pilot episode of the short lived CBS TV series Orleans starring Larry Hagman in 1997. In the movie Déjà Vu, the white terminal complex could be briefly seen in the background with a cruise ship docked next to it in the scene where Denzel Washington and Val Kilmer investigate the Canal Street Ferry explosion underneath the Crescent City Connection bridge.
