= Tulane University Marching Band =

College marching band in New Orleans

- School: Tulane University
- Location: New Orleans, Louisiana
- Conference: American Athletic Conference
- Founded: 1920
- Director: Barry Spanier
- Assistant Directors: Dylan Parilla-Koester; Andrew Szypula
- Members: 145 (2022)
- Fight song: "The Olive and the Blue" "Tulane Fight Song"
- Website: tulaneband.org

The Tulane University Marching Band (TUMB) is the marching band of Tulane University. It performs at every Tulane Green Wave football home game in Yulman Stadium, bowl games, and some away games. It is also marches in New Orleans Mardi Gras parades each year, having appeared in Le Krewe d'Etat, the Krewe of Thoth, the Krewe of Bacchus, and the Krewe of Rex, among others.

== History ==
- The band was formed in 1920 as a military band under the direction of Dr. Frederick Hard.
- Maynard J. Klein became director in 1936.
- John J. Morrissey became the director for 30 years beginning in 1938.
- The color guard was first introduced in 1938.
- The band was dissolved in the mid-1970s, shortly after the closure of Tulane Stadium.
- The band began its revival in 2004 with the help of SoundWave, the student-run pep band.
- In response to student and alumni interest, the university administration hired Barry Spanier in 2004. The current uniform design was adopted.
- As a result of Hurricane Katrina, the band's planned debut in the fall of 2005 was postponed.
- The band formally debuted in the Krewe of Alla Mardi Gras parade in 2006.
- The TUMB Mardi Gras doubloon was introduced in 2007.

== Organization ==
=== Leadership ===
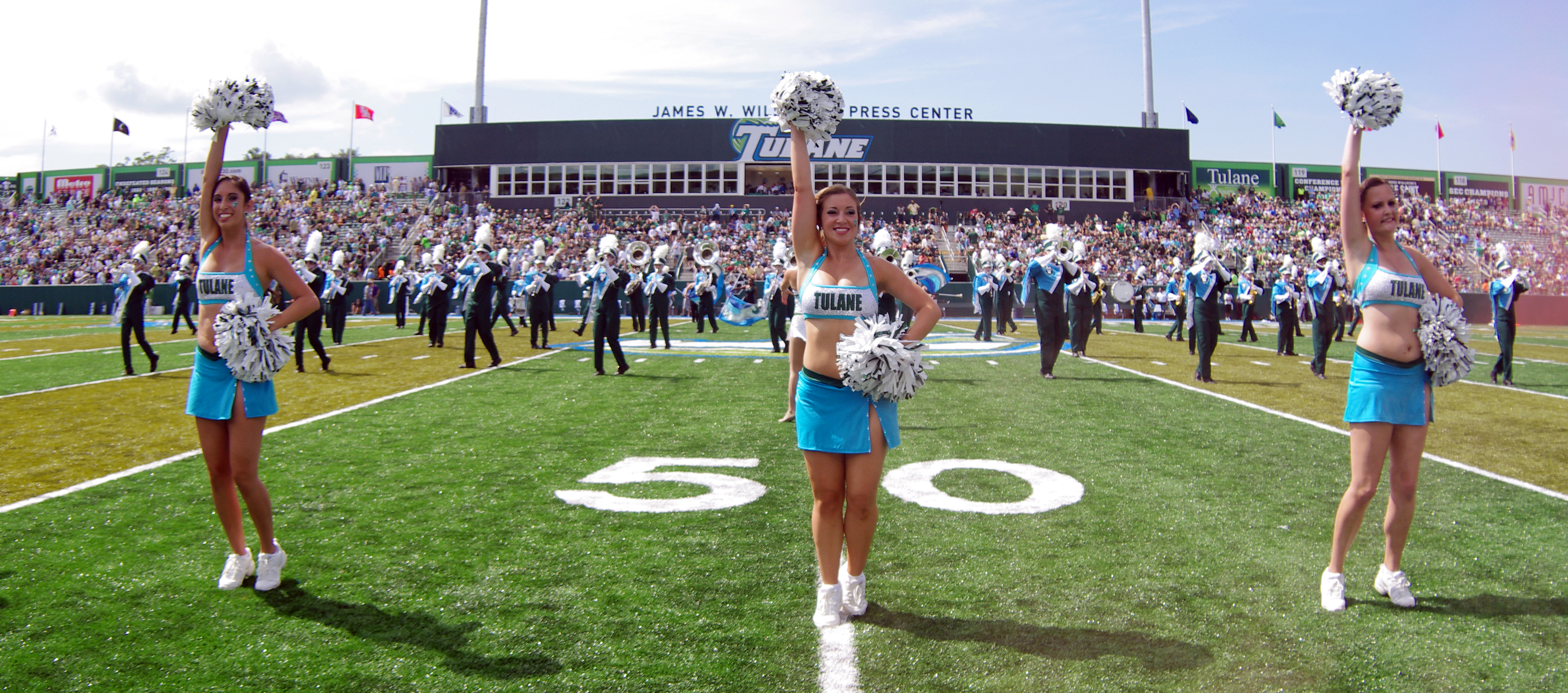
TUMB and Shockwave perform at pregame in Yulman Stadium

- Barry Spanier, Director
- Andrew Szypula, Assistant Director
- Dylan Parrilla-Koester, Assistant Director
- Rosalind Kidwell, Color Guard Instructor
- Tyler Hawk, Front Ensemble Instructor
- Annie Cuccia, Shockwave Director/Choreographer
- Anna Wildes, Program Coordinator
- Jared Kessler & Zachary St. Pierre, 2022-23 Drum Majors

=== Instrumentation ===
The TUMB marches silver Yamaha brass instruments to maintain a consistent look and sound. The drumline also uses Yamaha battery and front ensemble equipment and proudly use Vic Firth Sticks, Zildjian Cymbals, and Remo drumheads.

Woodwinds

- Piccolos
- Clarinets
- Alto saxophones
- Tenor saxophones
- Baritone saxophones

Brass

- Trumpets
- Mellophones
- Trombones
- Baritone horns
- Sousaphones

Percussion

- Battery
- Front Ensemble

=== Guard ===
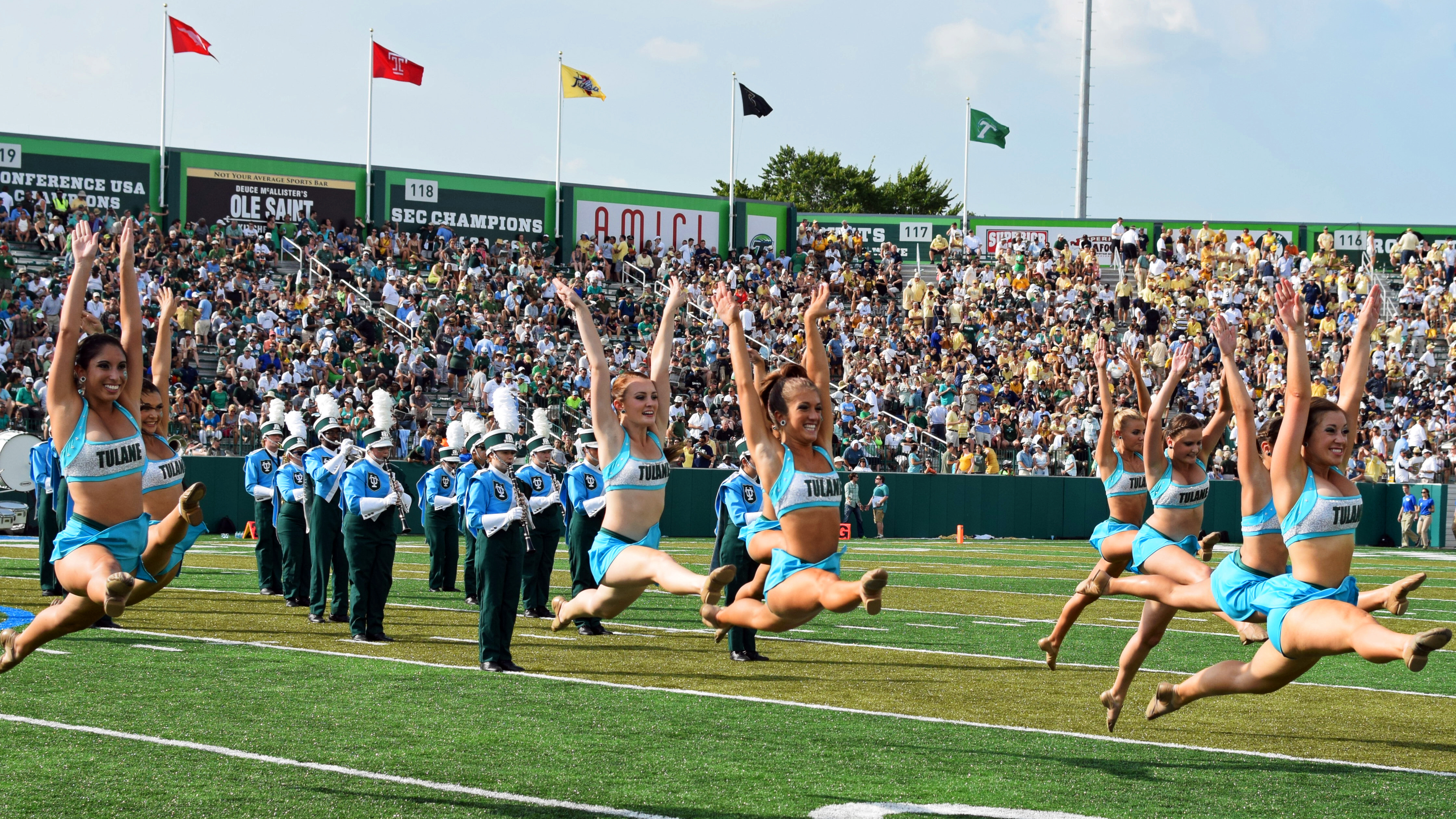
TUMB and Shockwave at halftime

The guard debuted in 2006 with retro uniforms based on archived designs and pictures. In 2009, it introduced a new design more in line with modern guard units, accordingly moving toward incorporation of ballet, jazz, modern, and contemporary modern dance. It performs predominately with flags, rifles, and sabres in pregame and halftime shows, as well as Mardi Gras parades and a Spring stage production. Unlike many university guards, the Tulane guard accepts both male and female members.

=== Shockwave ===
The dance team became an official part of the TUMB in 2009. Aside from performing at home and away football games, the team performs at Tulane basketball, volleyball, and baseball games, as well as Mardi Gras parades with the TUMB and various community events. Shockwave is coached by Annie Cuccia.

== Student benefits ==
Members of the TUMB receive credit both semesters - in the fall for football season and in the spring for Mardi Gras parades. Incoming freshmen who audition have the opportunity to be awarded scholarships that renew as long as they are members in good standing. Upperclassmen are eligible for an award each semester after they have received four credits in any TUMB-related course(s).

== Traditions ==
=== Gameday parade ===
After its field time in Yulman, the TUMB warms up behind Newcomb Hall, near the band's offices on Audubon Street. The band then begins the gameday parade from Newcomb Hall, through the two main tailgating quads on Tulane's Uptown campus, and then down McAlister Drive to the stadium. The parade is led by Tulane's cheerleaders throwing beads from a float created by the Kerns of Mardi Gras World, and fans follow the cheerleaders and band to Yulman Stadium to being each game.

=== Pregame ===
The TUMB during a Pregame Show in 2006

Following a video introduction on Yulman's video board, the TUMB runs onto the field to a drum cadence. The band then starts its performance with a fanfare based on Rebirth Brass Band's "Let's Go Get 'Em" then plays "Roll On, Tulane" before beginning "When the Saints Go Marching In." The TUMB, Shockwave, and cheer squad then lead fans in the Fight Song and "The Hullabaloo" Cheer while forming a traditional serif "T." Finally, the TUMB plays the Tulane University Alma Mater and The Star Spangled Banner before welcoming the Green Wave football team onto the field.

=== Halftime ===
The TUMB performs a halftime show at every home game and at any away games at which the full band is present. The band generally performs 2-3 shows a season, depending on scheduling, and themes can vary widely.

The TUMB enters the field at halftime in 2008.

== TUMBAA ==
The Tulane University Marching Band Alumni Association was formed in 2009 through the efforts of recent graduates. In 2014 it became an official Shared Interest Group of the Tulane Alumni Association. Its main focus is keeping alumni informed and organized, networking both inside and outside the association, and providing support to the TUMB. It also organizes the annual alumni band that joins the TUMB in the stands and at halftime during each homecoming game.

== Friends of the Band ==
The Friends of the Band is administered through the Tulane Fund, under the direction of Jeff Bush. It provides many forms of support, including an annual jambalaya dinner during band camp.

== SoundWave ==
The SounndWave pep band plays at all basketball and some volleyball games in Devlin Fieldhouse. Established in 1992 as a student organization, it became the impetus for the revival of the TUMB in 2005, performing at various athletic events and parades. It has since returned to its original form as a pep band and continues to function as a student organization separate from the TUMB. SoundWave's alumni are organized as the SoundWave Alumni & Booster Organization (SWABO) and provide additional support to the organization.

== Green Wave Brass Band ==
The Green Wave Brass Band (GWBB) formed in 2009, was founded and directed by Mark Lighthiser. Currently under the direction of Mendel Lee, the GWBB is the TUMB's own take on the traditional New Orleans brass band. The band's style emulates the raw street funk of such local groups as Rebirth Brass Band. It is a small-scale brass ensemble usually composed of 1-2 trumpets, 1-2 saxophones, and 1-2 trombones, a tuba, and a drummer (with bass and snare drums), though these positions rotate from a pool of members who come from the TUMB. The band performs in the premium areas of Yulman Stadium during the 3rd quarter of Tulane football games for fans and staff alike. The band regularly performs at public and private events around New Orleans, including bars, conventions, charity benefits, and televised events, including an appearance in the Tulane-themed episode of CNBC's Mad Money in 2011 and in MTV's Brothers Green in 2016. Members of the GWBB also participated in Shakespeare 400, a second-line funeral parade that took place in Shakespeare's hometown of Stratford-upon-Avon in the Spring of 2016.

== Green Wave Winds ==
Green Wave Winds (GWW) is a Winter Guard International Independent A Indoor Winds group founded and co-directed by Andrew Szypula and Mendel Lee in 2015. Composed of wind, percussion, and color guard performers in the Tulane and greater New Orleans community, the GWW currently compete in the Louisiana/Mississippi Color Guard and Percussion Circuit and in WGI Regionals.

== Additional Appearances ==
- Fox's The Best Damn Sports Show Period - New Orleans, September 2006
- New Orleans Saints Football Game - New Orleans, October 2006
- New Orleans Saints Super Bowl XLIV Victory Parade - New Orleans, February 2010
- Krewe of NFL Kickoff Game Parade - New Orleans, September 2010
- Wheel of Fortune - New Orleans, April 2011
- Fox & Friends - New Orleans, February 2013
- DirecTV Celebrity Beach Bowl (Super Bowl XLVII) - New Orleans, February 2013
- NCIS: New Orleans - February 2015
