= 610 Stompers =

Dance group in New Orleans, United States

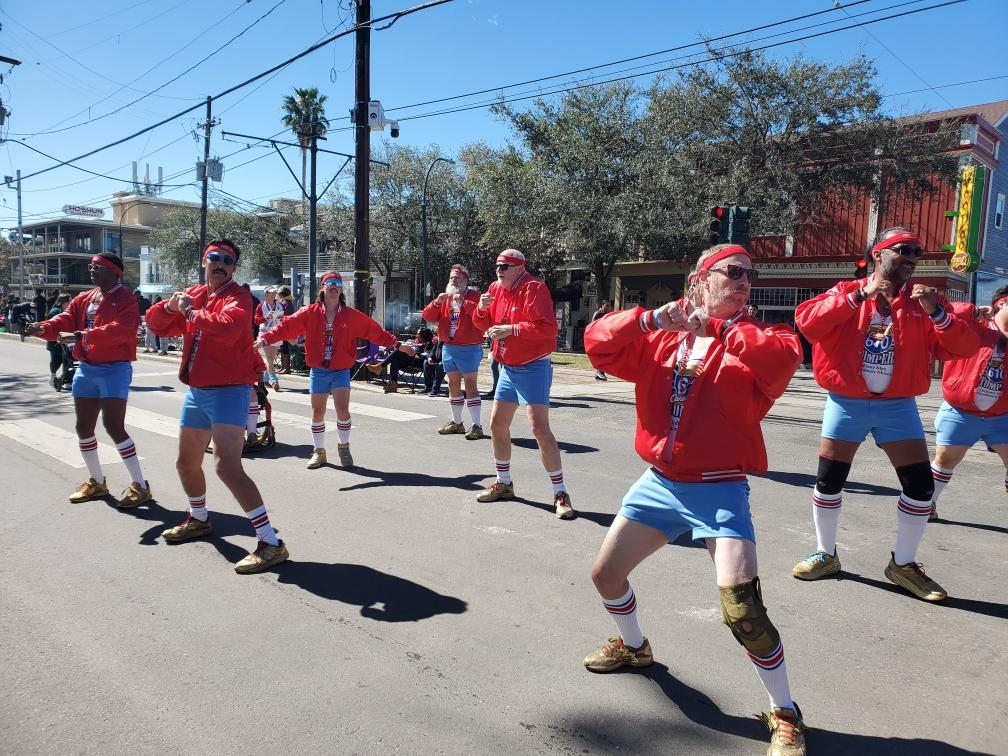
The 610 Stompers performing one of their dances while marching down the parade route.

Started in 2009, the 610 Stompers are a all-male dance group in New Orleans. Named for the Superdome section where the founder, Brett Patron (“Slab”), had season tickets to the New Orleans Saints, the 610 Stompers march in Mardi Gras parades, perform at charity events, and dance at halftime shows.

After three members of the Dancing Grannies were killed in the Waukesha Wisconsin Christmas parade in 2021, they were invited to perform with the Stompers during 2023's Mardi Gras season. The Dancing Grannies reciprocated the invitation, leading the Stompers to participate in several Wisconsin parades.

== Uniform ==
The 610 Stompers uniform is a 70s-style look of white tank tops, headbands, tube socks, blue shorts, gold spray-painted sneakers, and a signature red bomber jacket. The female counterpart to the 610 Stompers is the 610 Splits. Their uniform consists of a tennis skirts, jackets, and visors.
