= Environmental impact of Mardi Gras beads =

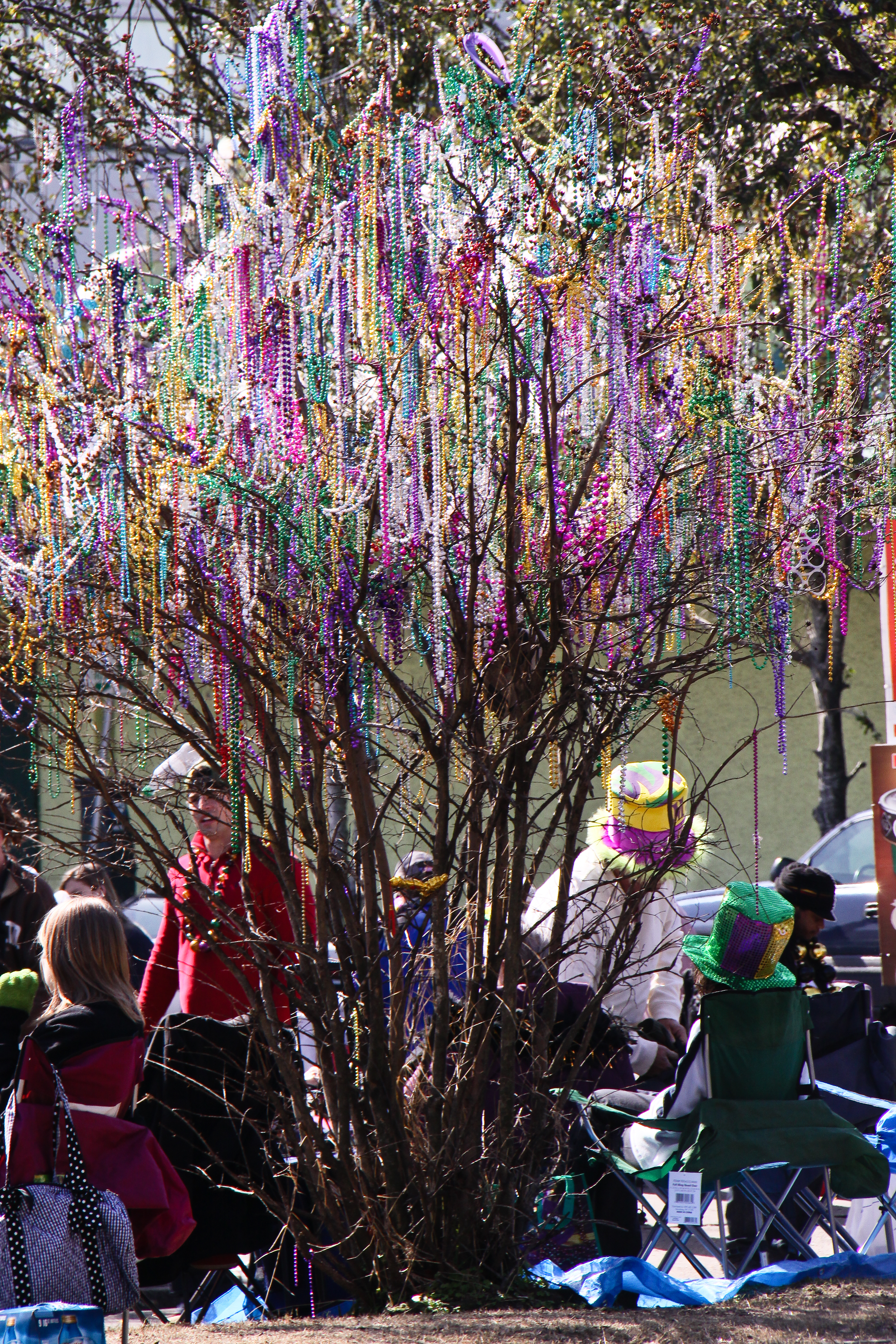
While thought to be decorative, Mardi Gras beads hanging on trees are harmful to the plant as a whole.

When the parade season ended in 2014, the New Orleans city government spent $1.5 million to pick up about 1,500 tons of Mardi Gras-induced waste, consisting mostly of beads. This is a recurring problem every year for the city. In addition, the city must also deal with the environmental repercussions endured after Mardi Gras. Because they are not biodegradable and contain high amounts of heavy metals, Mardi Gras beads put the local environment and health of southern Louisianians at risk.

== Bead composition ==
Polyethylene and polystyrene are popular plastics used in beads. Polystyrene is very stable and can last for many decades as the beads lay in landfills. Eventually, it will begin to slowly oxidize via UV light from the sun. In contrast, polyethylene cannot decompose with UV radiation and biodegrades extremely slowly.

Lead, cadmium, and other elements have been detected in beads in extremely high amounts through various analytical techniques. Many of these elements exceed the suggested safety limits set by the Consumer Product Safety Commission. For example, the safe amount of lead in a product is 100 ppm; however, there have been findings where the amount of lead in a bead surpassed the limit 300 times over. This threatens parade-goers with exposure to high amounts of lead, especially younger children that could potentially put the beads in their mouths.

== History ==
Plastic beads became popular in the 1960s, and were not always a part of Mardi Gras; they were introduced only in the late 1970s. The ritual of throwing Mardi Gras beads dates back to the nineteenth century, particularly the 1970s, in New Orleans. Beads used to be manufactured of glass, and many of them were imported from Czechoslovakia. The delicate glass beads were then replaced with the brightly colored and inexpensive plastic beads.

== Entry into the environment ==
Beads can accidentally enter storm drains, which empty into Lake Pontchartrain and the Mississippi River, which drains into the Gulf of Mexico. The metals in the beads put fish and other marine lifeforms at risk for lead and cadmium poisoning. Exposure to these metals in water causes high mortality rates and increased biomass of these metals among fish species within a month of exposure. Seafood is prevalent in the south Louisiana diet, most of which is harvested from the Gulf. Eating seafood contaminated with lead and cadmium puts people at risk for poisoning.

Beads also can get tangled in trees during parades. Here, the lead in the beads can get washed off via rain water and find its way into leaves and soil. Lead has been shown to be an inhibitor of cell division, water uptake, and photosynthesis, eventually causing death to the plant.

== Impact on humans ==
Lead exposure has been evidenced to significantly inhibit neurological function. One study examined identical twins who worked together as painters using lead-based paint. Using magnetic resonance spectroscopy, it was discovered that they both had lead levels in their bones about 5-10 times more than the average adult. One twin put himself at a higher risk of lead exposure because he was the only one that removed paint on the job. His lead concentration was 2.5 times higher than his twin’s; and after further testing, his memory was shown to be much worse than his twin’s.

Cadmium has been shown to be carcinogenic due to interactions with DNA topoisomerase IIα. This enzyme helps facilitate cell division and DNA repair, specifically with double strand breaks. Cadmium cations react with the topoisomerase in the following manner:

8 Cd^{2+} + topoisomerase IIα − 8H → topoisomerase IIα − 8 Cd^{2+}

Here, the cadmium ions react with sulfur-containing thiol groups in cysteine residues, effectively ruining the structure and function of the topoisomerase.

== Solutions ==
Polylactic acid monomer

Mardi Gras will unlikely be cancelled due to its popularity, cultural significance, and economic importance, but a concerted effort can still be made to curb the negative environmental effects of the beads. One suggested avenue is to replace currently used plastics with polylactic acid (PLA), an environmentally much more friendly material. This polymer can be degraded naturally into lactic acid via hydrolysis or self-hydrolysis, which decomposes whole PLA products in as quickly as a month. A second way is to "recycle" by purchasing used beads rather than buying new ones, which can also translate into cost savings for individual purchasers or re-sellers who buy the beads in large quantities; recycling also provides an environmentally friendly method of "disposal" for those who initially purchased Mardi Gras beads.

Another alternative that has an exponentially reduced environmental impact is to impose restrictions on the presence of the current Mardi Gras beads, such as banning them altogether but permitting non-toxic, eco-friendly alternatives such as beads made from paste, paper, clay, wood, or even vegetables (peas painted with a water-based, non-toxic paint, for example). Some cities and communities in the United States have successfully banned plastic bags, so this would not be an impossible goal. To support and enforce the restriction on toxic beads and ensure implementation of the non-toxic alternatives, the City of New Orleans could also begin imposing a substantial tax or fee on vendors, entertainers, attendees, and other individuals and businesses associated with Mardi Gras to alleviate the hefty financial cost of clean-up that the city itself must bear every year.
