= Jefferson City Buzzards =

The Jefferson City Buzzards are the oldest marching club in New Orleans Mardi Gras. The club was founded in 1890. Named after the former New Orleans municipality of Jefferson City, the Buzzards have an all-male membership and are headquartered at 5215 Annunciation Street.

The Jefferson City Buzzards march in three parades each spring. Two weeks prior to Mardi Gras, the club holds a "practice parade" in uptown New Orleans dressed in drag. On Mardi Gras morning around 6:45am, wearing traditional Mardi Gras costumes, the club begins marching at Exposition Boulevard and Laurel Street, uptown at the edge of Audubon Park. The club walks down Laurel Street to Webster Street, turning right on Tchoupitoulas Street, down Tchoupitoulas Street to Arabella Street, then to Magazine Street, and finally to St. Charles Avenue down to Canal Street where the Club precedes Rex. The route proceeds to Rampart Street then makes a U-turn to end at Magazine and Poydras Streets. The club hands out emblem doubloons and paper flowers as favors.

The Buzzards also parade on Metairie Road as part of Metairie's St. Patrick's Day parade (which takes place on the Sunday before St. Patrick's Day), and on Veterans' Memorial Highway in Metairie the following Sunday as part of the annual Irish-Italian parade.

In August 1958, Armand Hug and His New Orleans Dixielanders made a television appearance on Art Ford's Jazz Party program on WDSU, debuting a new song entitled "The Buzzard Parade" which would eventually become the marching club's signature theme.

The Jefferson City Buzzards are briefly featured in the 1978 documentary 'Always For Pleasure' by Les Blank.
