= Mardi Gras in New Orleans =

Annual carnival celebration in New Orleans, Louisiana

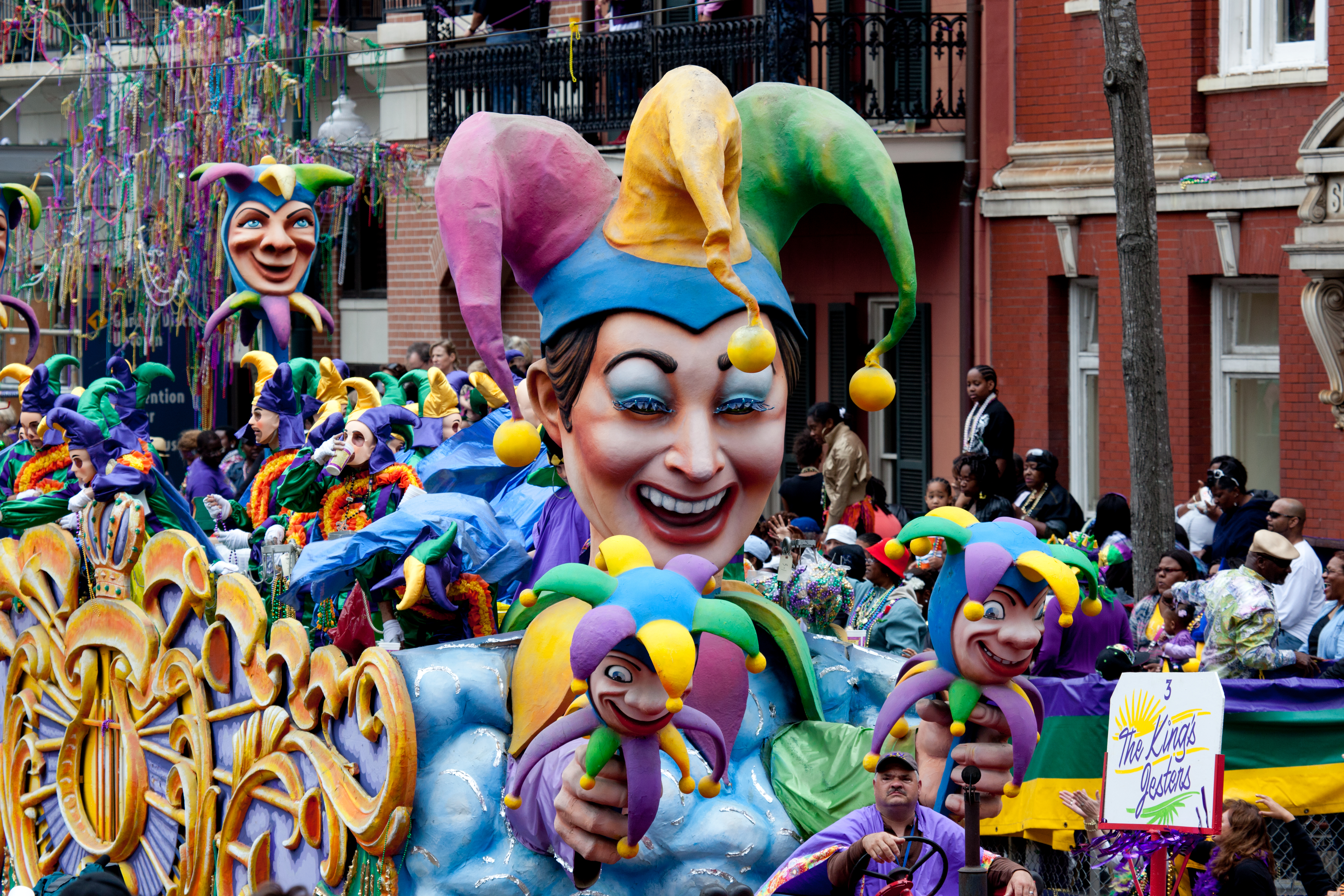
- A Mardi Gras Parade in New Orleans, 2011
- Status: Active
- Frequency: Annual, Day before Ash Wednesday
- Locations: French Quarter; New Orleans, Louisiana
- Country: United States

The holiday of Mardi Gras is celebrated in southern Louisiana, including the city of New Orleans. Celebrations happen for about two weeks, culminating on Mardi Gras (French for "Fat Tuesday"), a celebratory name for Shrove Tuesday, the day before Ash Wednesday, which is the start of Lent in the Western Christian tradition. The overall season is known as Carnival and begins on 12th Night, January 6th, and extends until midnight before Ash Wednesday. Parties known as Club or Krewe balls start soon after, many of which are private, with their Kings and Queens coming from wealthy old families and their courts consisting of the season's debutantes. Most of the high society Krewes do not stage parades. As Fat Tuesday approaches, Mardi Gras parades start in earnest. Usually there is one major parade scheduled each day, while many days have several large parades. The largest and most elaborate parades take place the last five days of the Mardi Gras season. In the final week, many events occur throughout New Orleans and surrounding communities, including parades and balls (some of them masquerade balls).

The parades in New Orleans are organized by social clubs known as krewes; most follow the same parade schedule and route each year. The earliest-established krewes were the Mistick Krewe of Comus, the earliest, Rex, the Knights of Momus and the Krewe of Proteus. Several modern "super krewes" are well known for holding large parades and events (often featuring celebrity guests), such as the Krewe of Endymion, the Krewe of Bacchus, as well as the Zulu Social Aid & Pleasure Club—a predominantly African American krewe. Float riders traditionally toss throws into the crowds. The most common throws are strings of colorful plastic beads, doubloons, decorated plastic "throw cups", and small inexpensive toys. Major krewes follow the same parade schedule and route each year.

While many tourists center their Carnival season activities on Bourbon Street, major parades originate in the Uptown and Mid-City districts and follow a route along St. Charles Avenue and Canal Street, on the upriver side of the Spanish Quarter. Walking parades - most notably the Krewe du Vieux and 'tit Rex - also take place downtown in the Faubourg Marigny and Spanish Quarter in the weekends preceding Mardi Gras Day. Mardi Gras Day traditionally concludes with the "Meeting of the Courts" between Rex and Comus.

== History ==
=== Early history ===
The first record of Mardi Gras being celebrated in Louisiana was at the mouth of the Mississippi River in what is now lower Plaquemines Parish, Louisiana, on March 2, 1699. Iberville, Bienville, and their men celebrated it as part of an observance of Catholic practice. The date of the first celebration of the festivities in New Orleans is unknown. A 1730 account by Marc-Antoine Caillot reports celebrating with music and dance, masking and costuming (including cross-dressing); an account from 1743 shows that the custom of Carnival balls was already established. Processions and wearing of masks in the streets on Mardi Gras took place. They were sometimes prohibited by law, and were quickly renewed whenever such restrictions were lifted or enforcement waned.

In 1833, Bernard Xavier de Marigny de Mandeville, a rich plantation owner of French descent, raised money to fund an official Mardi Gras celebration. James R. Creecy in his book Scenes in the South, and Other Miscellaneous Pieces describes New Orleans Mardi Gras in 1835:

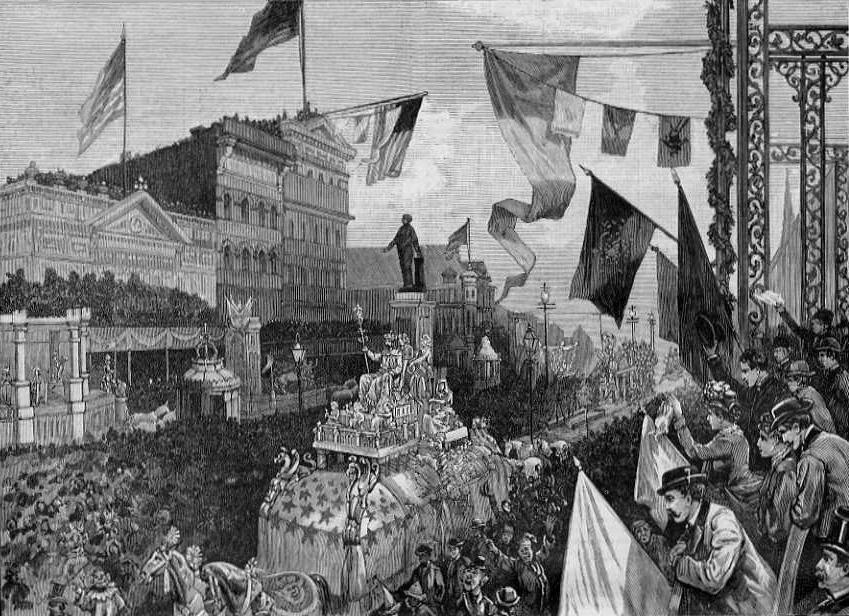
The Carnival at New Orleans, 1885

Shrove Tuesday is a day to be remembered by strangers in New Orleans, for that is the day for fun, frolic, and comic masquerading. All of the mischief of the city is alive and wide awake in active operation. Men and boys, women and girls, bond and free, white and black, yellow and brown, exert themselves to invent and appear in grotesque, quizzical, diabolic, horrible, strange masks, and disguises. Human bodies are seen with heads of beasts and birds, beasts and birds with human heads; demi-beasts, demi-fishes, snakes' heads and bodies with arms of apes; man-bats from the moon; mermaids; satyrs, beggars, monks, and robbers parade and march on foot, on horseback, in wagons, carts, coaches, cars, &c., in rich confusion, up and down the streets, wildly shouting, singing, laughing, drumming, fiddling, fifeing, and all throwing flour broadcast as they wend their reckless way.

In 1856, 21 businessmen gathered at a club room in the French Quarter to organize a secret society to observe Mardi Gras with a formal parade. They founded New Orleans' first and oldest krewe, the Mistick Krewe of Comus. According to one historian, "Comus was aggressively English in its celebration of what New Orleans had always considered a French festival. It is hard to think of a clearer assertion than this parade that the lead in the holiday had passed from French-speakers to Anglo-Americans. ... To a certain extent, Americans 'Americanized' New Orleans and its Creoles. To a certain extent, New Orleans 'creolized' the Americans. Thus the wonder of Anglo-Americans boasting of how their business prowess helped them construct a more elaborate version than was traditional. The lead in organized Carnival passed from Creole to American just as political and economic power did over the course of the nineteenth century. The spectacle of Creole-American Carnival, with Americans using Carnival forms to compete with Creoles in the ballrooms and on the streets, represents the creation of a New Orleans culture neither entirely Creole nor entirely American."

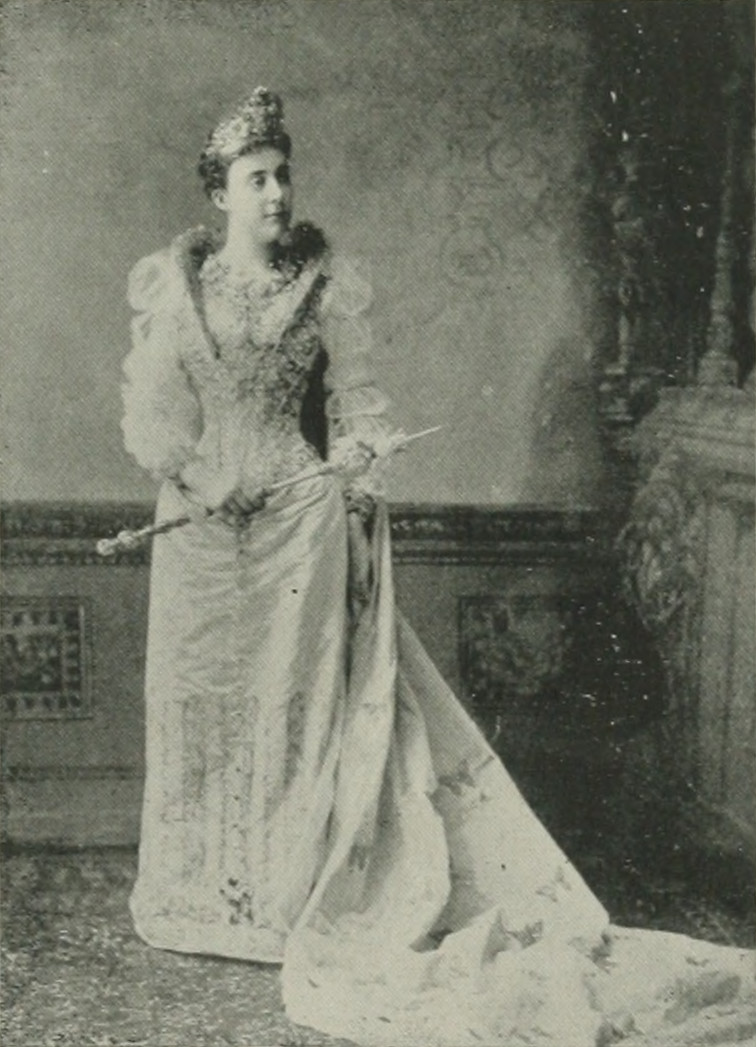
Bessie Behan, Carnival Queen, 1891

In 1872, Grand Duke Alexei Alexandrovich of Russia attended Mardi Gras celebrations, where he was guest of honor reviewing the inaugural Rex parade.

In 1875, Louisiana declared Mardi Gras a legal state holiday. War, economic, political, and weather conditions sometimes led to cancellation of some or all major parades, especially during the American Civil War, World War I and World War II, but the city has always celebrated Carnival.

The 1898, Rex parade, with the theme of "Harvest Queens", was filmed by the American Mutoscope Co. The rumored but long-lost recording was rediscovered in 2022. The two-minute film records 6 parade floats, including one transporting a live ox. In December 2022, the film was deemed "culturally, historically, or aesthetically significant" by the National Film Registry by the Library of Congress.

=== 20th and 21st centuries ===
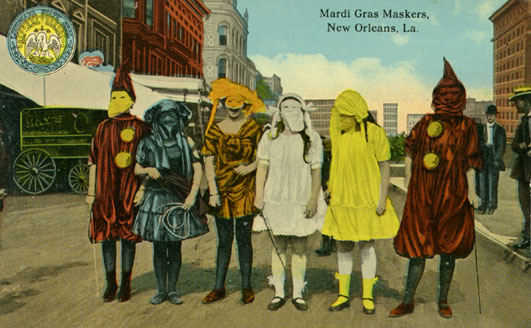
Mardi Gras maskers; c. 1915 postcard

In 1979, the New Orleans police department went on strike. The official parades were canceled or moved to surrounding communities, such as Jefferson Parish, Louisiana. Significantly fewer tourists than usual came to the city. Masking, costuming, and celebrations continued anyway, with National Guard troops maintaining order. Guardsmen prevented crimes against persons or property but made no attempt to enforce laws regulating morality or drug use; for these reasons, some in the French Quarter bohemian community recall 1979 as the city's best Mardi Gras ever.

In 1991, the New Orleans City Council passed an ordinance that required social organizations, including Mardi Gras Krewes, to certify publicly that they did not discriminate on the basis of race, religion, gender or sexual orientation, to obtain parade permits and other public licenses. Shortly after the law was passed, the city demanded that these krewes provide them with membership lists, contrary to the long-standing traditions of secrecy and the distinctly private nature of these groups. In protest—and because the city claimed the parade gave it jurisdiction to demand otherwise-private membership lists—the 19th-century krewes Comus and Momus stopped parading. Proteus did parade in the 1992 Carnival season but also suspended its parade for a time, returning to the parade schedule in 2000.

Several organizations brought suit against the city, challenging the law as unconstitutional. Two federal courts later declared that the ordinance was an unconstitutional infringement on First Amendment rights of free association, and an unwarranted intrusion on the privacy of the groups subject to the ordinance. The US Supreme Court refused to hear the city's appeal from this decision.

Today, New Orleans krewes operate under a business structure; membership is open to anyone who pays dues, and any member can have a place on a parade float.

==== Effects of Hurricane Katrina ====
The devastation caused by Hurricane Katrina on August 29, 2005, caused a few people to question the future of the city's Mardi Gras celebrations. Mayor Ray Nagin, who was up for reelection in early 2006, tried to play this sentiment for electoral advantage. However, the economics of Carnival were, and are, too important to the city's revival.

The city government, essentially bankrupt after Hurricane Katrina, pushed for a scaled back celebration to limit strains on city services. However, many krewes insisted that they wanted to and would be ready to parade, so negotiations between krewe leaders and city officials resulted in a compromise schedule. It was scaled back but less severely than originally suggested.

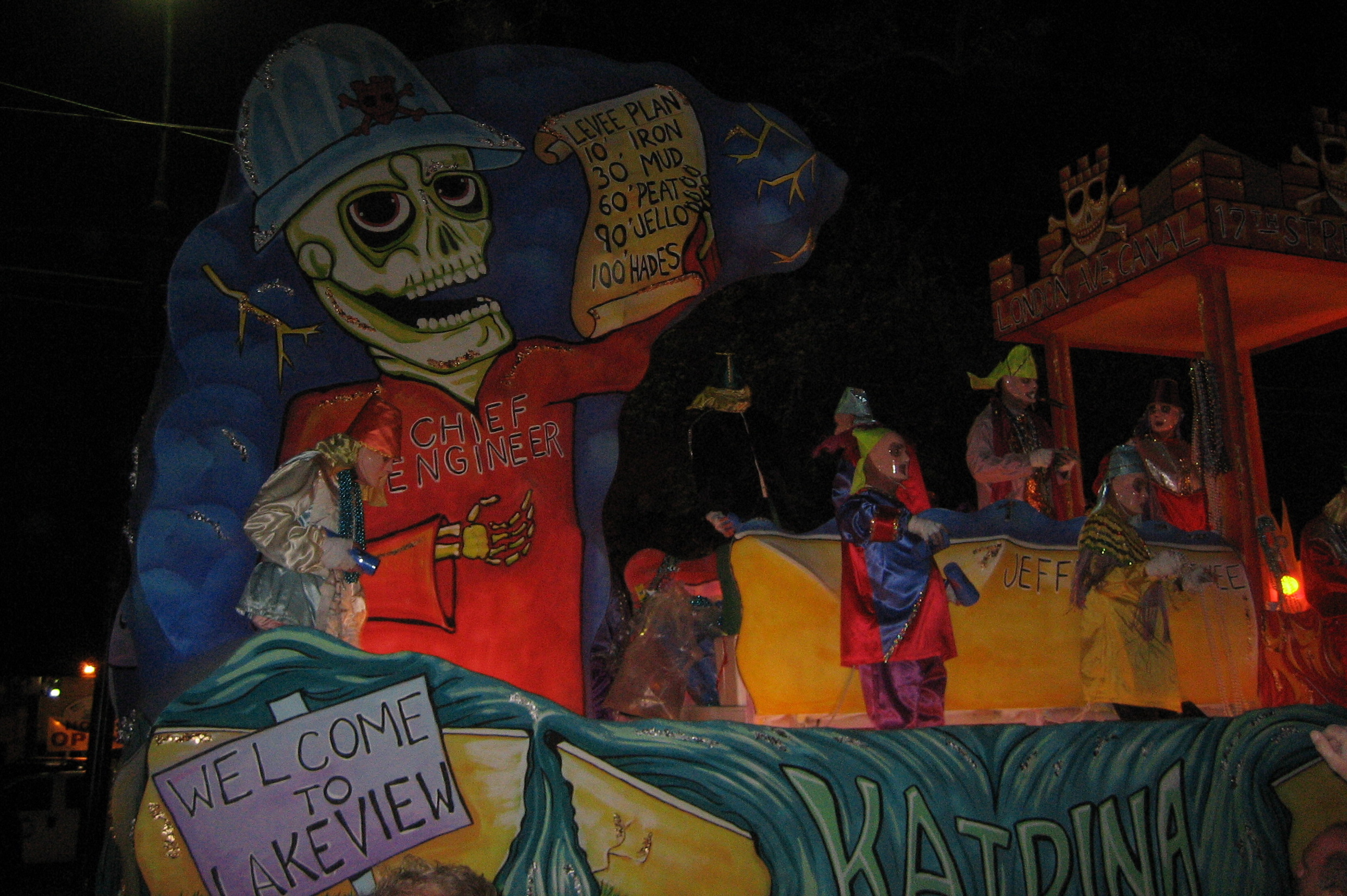
2006: A Knights of Chaos float satirizes the U.S. Army Corps of Engineers, responsible for the failed levees in New Orleans

The 2006 New Orleans Carnival schedule included the Krewe du Vieux on its traditional route through Marigny and the French Quarter on February 11, the Saturday two weekends before Mardi Gras. There were several parades on Saturday, February 18, and Sunday the 19th a week before Mardi Gras. Parades followed daily from Thursday night through Mardi Gras. Other than Krewe du Vieux and two Westbank parades going through Algiers, all New Orleans parades were restricted to the Saint Charles Avenue Uptown to Canal Street route, a section of the city which escaped significant flooding. Some krewes unsuccessfully pushed to parade on their traditional Mid-City route, despite the severe flood damage suffered by that neighborhood.

The city restricted how long parades could be on the street and how late at night they could end. National Guard troops assisted with crowd control for the first time since 1979. Louisiana State troopers also assisted, as they have many times in the past. Many floats had been partially submerged in floodwaters for weeks. While some krewes repaired and removed all traces of these effects, others incorporated flood lines and other damage into the designs of the floats.

Most of the locals who worked on the floats and rode on them were significantly affected by the storm's aftermath. Many had lost most or all of their possessions, but enthusiasm for Carnival was even more intense as an affirmation of life. The themes of many costumes and floats had more barbed satire than usual, with commentary on the trials and tribulations of living in the devastated city. References included MREs, Katrina refrigerators and FEMA trailers, along with much mocking of the Federal Emergency Management Agency (FEMA) and local and national politicians.

By the 2009 season, the Endymion parade had returned to the Mid-City route, and other Krewes expanding their parades Uptown.

==== 2020 tandem float incidents ====
In 2020, two parade attendees—one during the Nyx parade, and one during the Endymion parade, were killed after being struck and run over in between interconnected "tandem floats" towed by a single vehicle. Following the incident during the Nyx parade, there were calls for New Orleans officials to address safety issues with these floats (including outright bans, or requiring the gaps to be filled in using a barrier). Following the second death during the Endymion parade on February 22, 2020 (which caused the parade to be halted and cancelled), city officials announced that tandem floats would be banned effective immediately, with vehicles restricted to one, single float only.

==== Impact of the COVID-19 pandemic ====
Unknown to the participants and local leaders at the time, the 2020 Carnival season (with parades running from January through Mardi Gras Day on February 25) coincided with increasing spread of coronavirus disease 2019 (COVID-19) in the United States as part of what was then classified as a global epidemic. At the time, scrutiny over large public gatherings had yet to emerge, while scrutiny over international travel primarily placed an emphasis on restricting travel from China—the country from which the disease originated. The first case of COVID-19 in Louisiana was reported on March 9, two weeks after the end of Mardi Gras.

Subsequently, the state of Louisiana saw a significant impact from the pandemic, with New Orleans in particular seeing a high rate of cases. Louisiana State University (LSU) associate professor Susanne Straif-Bourgeoi suggested that the rapid spread may have been aided by Mardi Gras festivities. Researchers of the University of Louisiana at Lafayette determined that Louisiana had the fastest growth rate of cases (67.8%, overtaking New York's 66.1% growth) in the 14 days since its first reported case than any region in the entire world.

Mayor LaToya Cantrell stated that she would have cancelled Mardi Gras festivities had she been provided with sufficient warning by the federal government, and criticized the Trump administration for downplaying the threat. Amid continued spread of COVID-19 across the country, in early-November 2020 Cantrell stated that celebrations in 2021 would have to be "something different", as Mardi Gras could not be canceled outright since it is a religious observance. A sub-committee of the Mardi Gras Advisory Committee focused on COVID-19 proposed that parades still be held but with strict safety protocols and recommendations, including enforcement of social distancing, highly recommending the wearing of face masks by attendees, discouraging "high value" throws in order to discourage crowding, as well as discouraging the consumption of alcohol, and encouraging more media coverage of parades to allow at-home viewing. Alcohol consumption during Mardi Gras, has historically been associated with elevated rates of alcohol-involved traffic crashes, according to a multi-year analysis of statewide crash data.

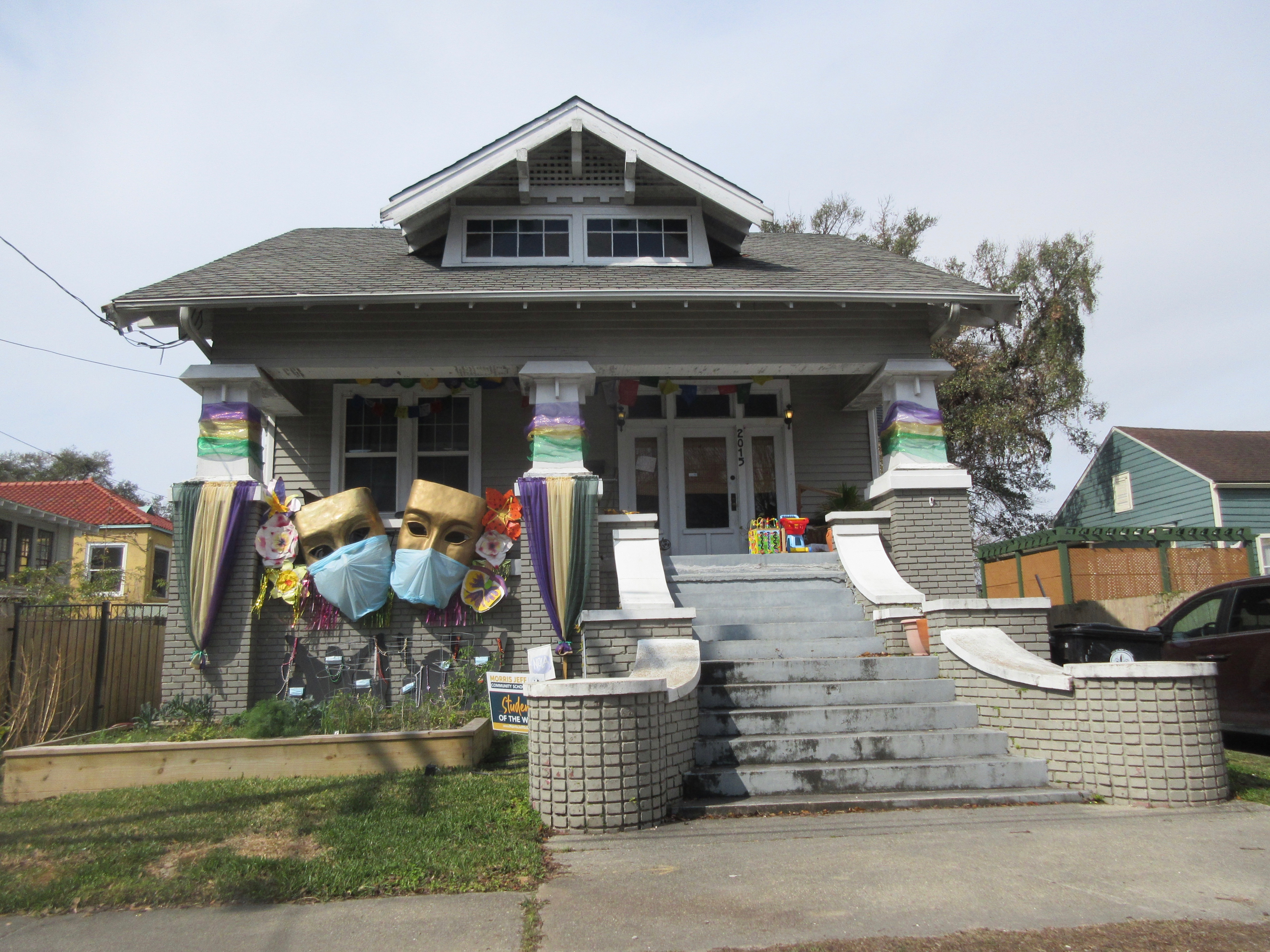
A decorated home in New Orleans during Mardi Gras season in 2021.

On November 17, 2020, Mayor Cantrell's communications director Beau Tidwell announced that the city would prohibit parades during Carnival season in 2021. Tidwell once again stressed that Mardi Gras was not "cancelled", but that it would have to be conducted safely, and that allowing parades was not "responsible" as they can be superspreading events. This marked the first large-scale cancellation of Mardi Gras parades since the 1979 police strike. Other krewes subsequently announced that they would cancel their in-person balls, including Endymion and Rex (who therefore did not name a King and Queen of Mardi Gras for the first time since World War II).

Socially-distanced festivities were established by residents, including "house floats"–a trend of decorating homes in the style of parade floats. A Facebook group known as the "Krewe of House Floats" shared photos of the homes and provided maps, recording participation in the movement in both New Orleans and abroad, including at least one in Australia.

On February 5, 2021, in response to continued concerns surrounding "recent large crowds in the Quarter" and variants of SARS-CoV-2 as Shrove Tuesday neared, Mayor Cantrell ordered all bars in New Orleans (including those with temporary permits to operate as restaurants) to close from February 12 through February 16 (Mardi Gras), and prohibited to-go drink sales by restaurants, and all packaged liquor sales in the French Quarter. To discourage gatherings, pedestrian access to Bourbon Street, Decatur Street, Frenchmen Street between 7:00 p.m. and 3:00 a.m., and Claiborne Avenue under the bridge, was restricted by checkpoints to those accessing businesses and homes within the areas. Mayor Cantrell stated that she would "rather be accused of doing too much than doing too little." The move caught some establishments off-guard, as they had been preparing for and anticipating business on Mardi Gras.

Parades were allowed to return for 2022. In December 2021, the city announced that parades would have modified routes in 2022 due to New Orleans Police Department staffing shortages. On January 6, 2022, Mayor Cantrell stated during a kickoff event that "without a doubt, we will have Mardi Gras in 2022", citing high COVID-19 vaccination rates, and customarily asked residents to "do everything that we know is necessary to keep our people safe." The Krewe de Jeanne D'Arc ceremonially led their parade with a group of marchers with brooms wearing plague doctor outfits, tasked to "sweep the plague away".

The city announced COVID-19 protocols for Mardi Gras 2022 in February 2022, which requires, at a minimum, all participants in a parade (including marchers, performers, and those a riding a float) to present proof of vaccination or a negative COVID-19 test from within the past 72 hours. Some krewes chose to not accept negative tests at all, while some krewes (such as the Krewe of Muses, which also announced plans to have COVID-19 rapid tests as throws) had already announced vaccination requirements for parade participants ahead of the official requirement. Despite the presence of Omicron variant, city health director Jennifer Avegno stated that she was confident Mardi Gras could be conducted in a more normal fashion over 2021.

== Traditional colors ==
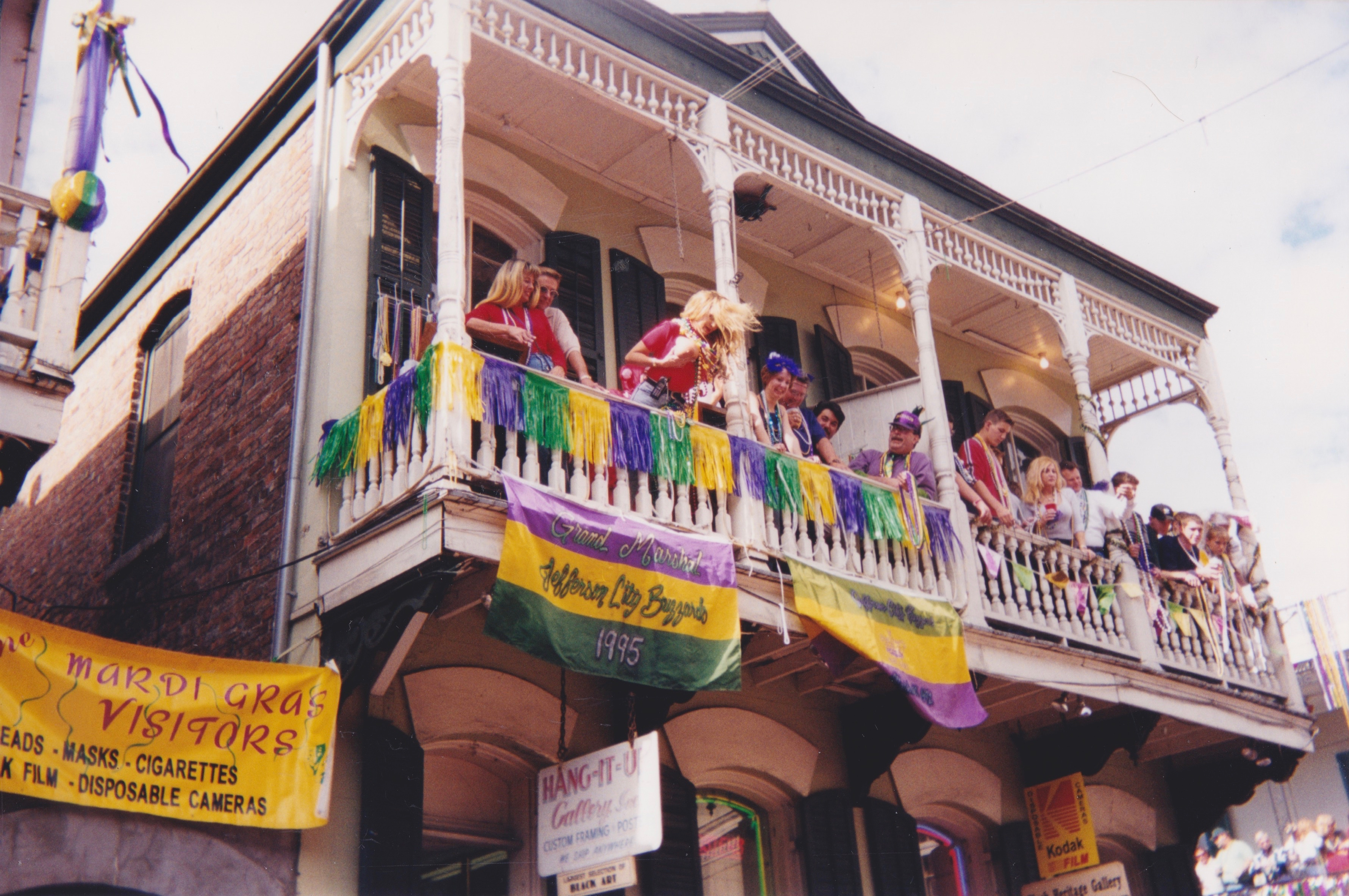
A building with purple, green, and gold banners and decorations during Mardi Gras in 1999.

Historian Errol Laborde theorized that purple, green, and gold were chosen by Rex as the colors of Mardi Gras since they could be arranged in a tricolor that follows the rule of tincture.

The colors traditionally associated with Mardi Gras in New Orleans are purple, green, and gold. The colors were first specified in proclamations by the Rex organization during the lead-up to their inaugural parade in 1872, suggesting that balconies be draped in banners of these colors. It is unknown why these specific colors were chosen; some accounts suggest that they were initially selected solely on their aesthetic appeal, as opposed to any true symbolism. Following a color-themed Rex parade in 1892, Rex declared that the colors symbolized justice, power, and faith respectively.

Mardi Gras historian Errol Laborde believed that the colors were chosen by Rex because they could form a heraldic tricolor to represent their "kingdom". Purple is widely associated with royalty, while white was already heavily used on other national flags, and was thus avoided. Furthermore, a flag in green, gold and purple in that order complies with the rule of tincture, which states that metals (gold or silver) can only be placed on or next to other colors, and that colors cannot be placed on or next to other colors. Despite technically violating the rule of tincture, the colors are still traditionally addressed as purple, green, and gold, in that order.

== Contemporary Mardi Gras ==
=== Epiphany ===
Epiphany on January 6, has been recognized as the start of the New Orleans Carnival season since at least 1900; locally, it is sometimes known as Twelfth Night although this term properly refers to Epiphany Eve, January 5, the evening of the twelfth day of Christmastide. The Twelfth Night Revelers, New Orleans' second-oldest Krewe, have staged a parade and masked ball on this date since 1870. A number of other groups such as the Phunny Phorty Phellows, La Société Pas Si Secrète Des Champs-Élysées and the Krewe de Jeanne D'Arc have more recently begun to stage events on Epiphany as well.

Many of Carnival's oldest societies, such as the Independent Strikers' Society, hold masked balls but no longer parade in public.

Mardi Gras season continues through Shrove Tuesday or Fat Tuesday.

=== Days leading up to Mardi Gras Day ===
A 2020 study estimated that Mardi Gras brings 1.4 million visitors to New Orleans.

Wednesday night begins with Druids, and is followed by Alla.

Thursday night starts off with The Knights of Babylon, and then another all-women's parade featuring the Krewe of Muses. The parade is relatively new, but its membership has tripled since its start in 2001. It is popular for its throws (highly sought-after decorated shoes and other trinkets) and themes poking fun at politicians and celebrities.

Friday night is the occasion of the large Mystic Krewe of Hermes and satirical Krewe D'État parades, ending with one of the fastest-growing krewes, the Krewe of Morpheus. There are several smaller neighborhood parades like the Krewe of Barkus and the Krewe of OAK.

Several daytime parades roll on Saturday (including Krewe of Tucks and Krewe of Iris) and on Sunday (Thoth, Okeanos, and Krewe of Mid-City).

The first of the "super krewes", Endymion, parades on Saturday night, with the celebrity-led Bacchus parade on Sunday night and Harry Connick Jr.'s Krewe of Orpheus on Monday night.

=== Mardi Gras Day ===
The celebrations begin early on Mardi Gras Day, which can fall on any Tuesday between February 3 and March 9 (depending on the date of Easter, and thus of Ash Wednesday).

In New Orleans, the Zulu parade rolls first, starting at 8:00 a.m. on the corner of Jackson and Claiborne and ending at Broad and Orleans, Rex follows Zulu as it turns onto St. Charles following the traditional Uptown route from Napoleon to St. Charles and then to Canal St. Truck parades follow Rex and often have hundreds of floats blowing loud horns, with entire families riding and throwing much more than just the traditional beads and doubloons. Numerous smaller parades and walking clubs also parade around the city. The Jefferson City Buzzards, the Lyons Club, the Irish Channel Corner Club, Pete Fountain's Half Fast Walking Club and the KOE all start early in the day Uptown and make their way to the French Quarter with at least one jazz band. At the other end of the old city, the Society of Saint Anne journeys from the Bywater through Marigny and the French Quarter to meet Rex on Canal Street. The Pair-O-Dice Tumblers rambles from bar to bar in Marigny and the French Quarter from noon to dusk. Various groups of Mardi Gras Indians, divided into uptown and downtown tribes, parade in their finery.

For upcoming Mardi Gras Dates through the year 2100 see Mardi Gras Dates.

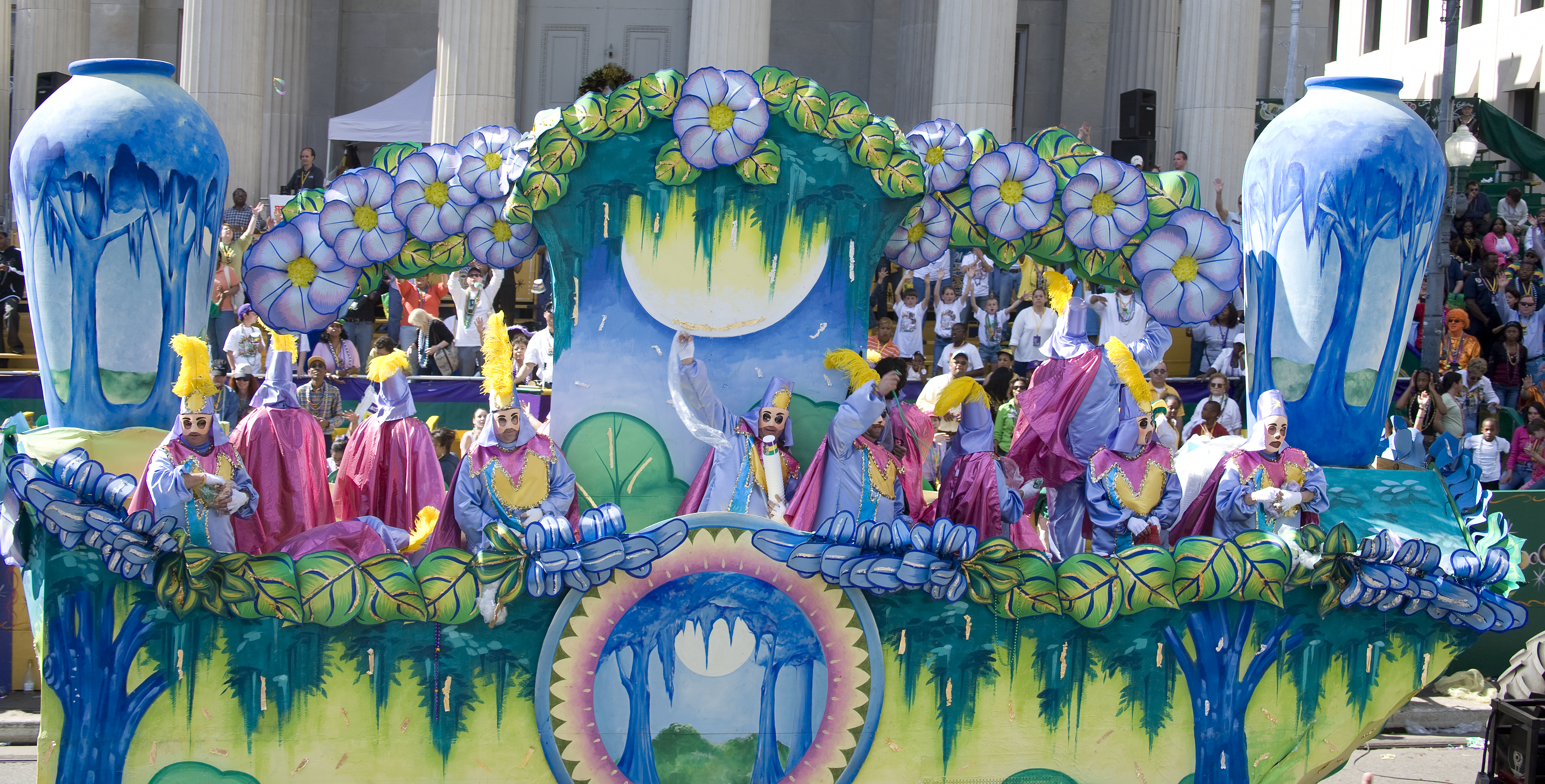
Float on St. Charles Avenue in front of Gallier Hall, 2006

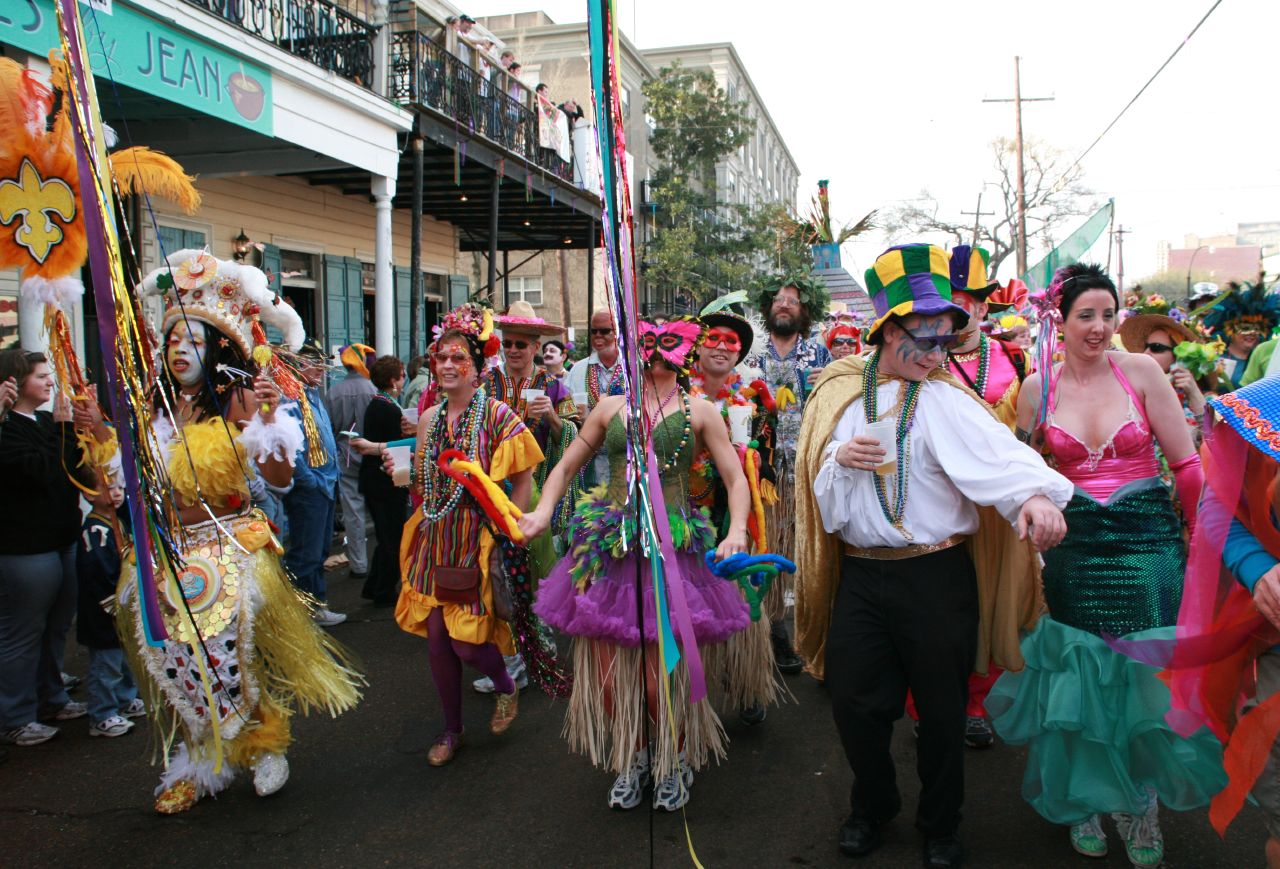
Revelers on St. Charles Avenue, 2007

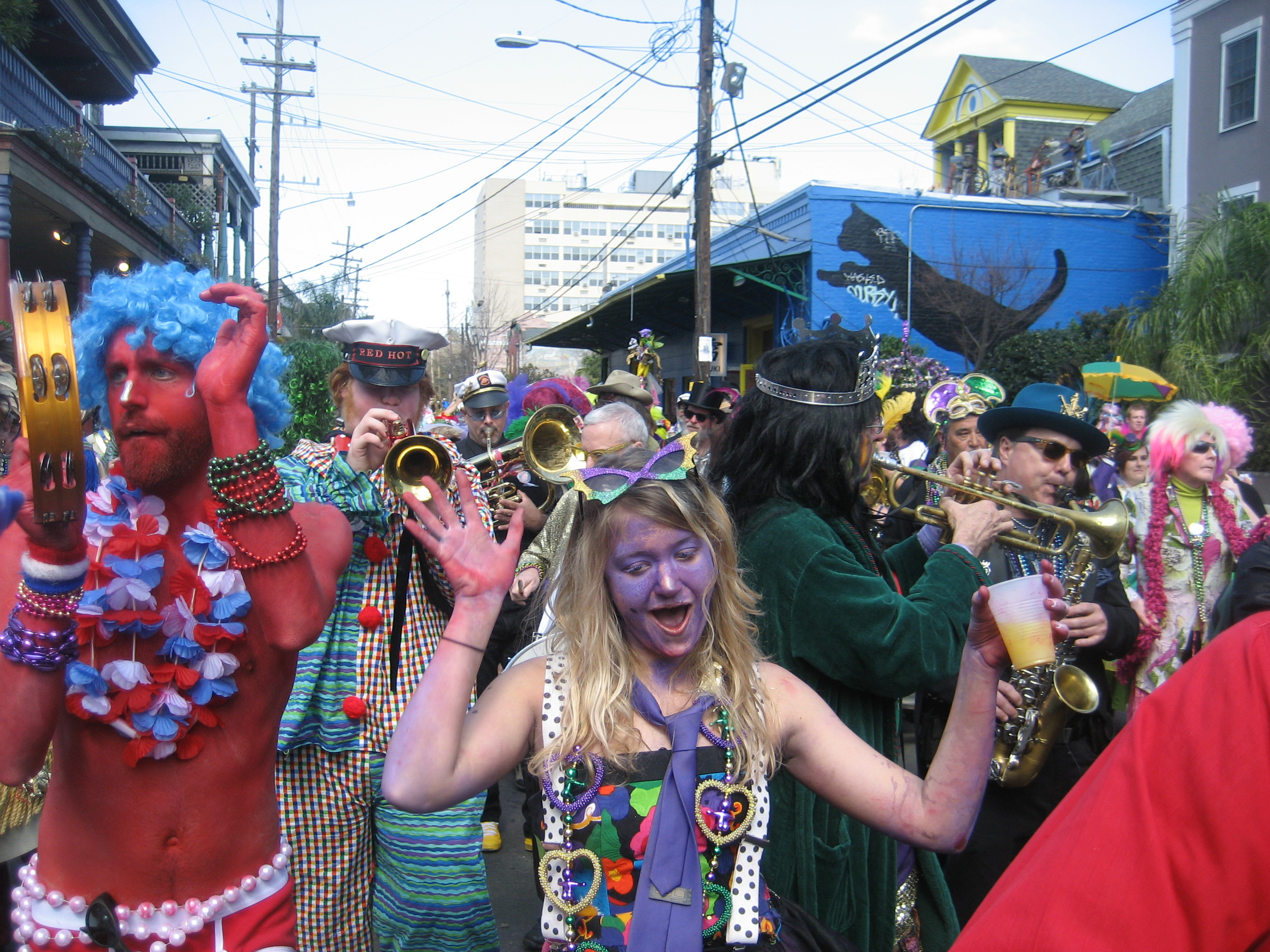
Revelers on Frenchmen Street, 2009

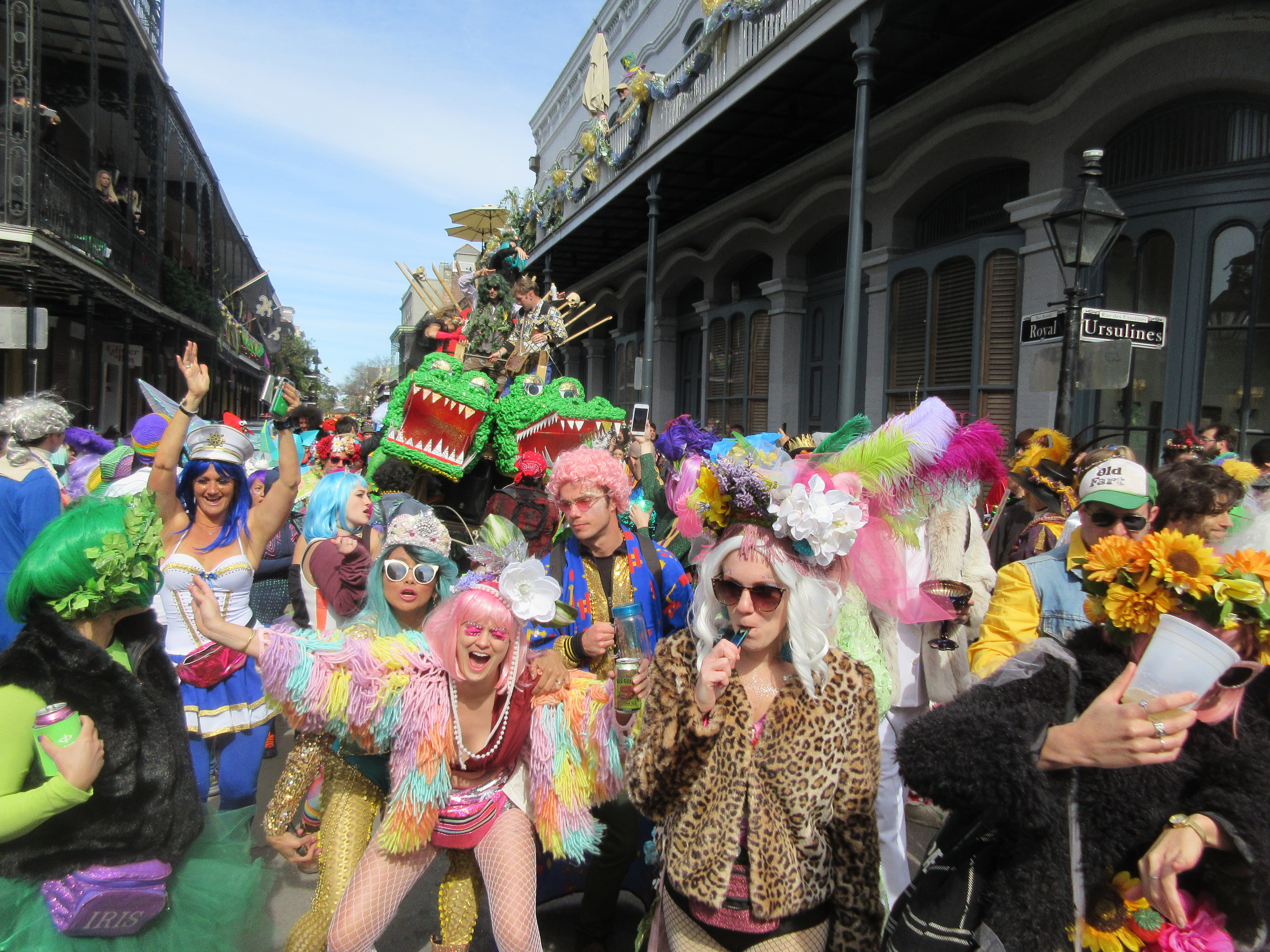
Revelers on Royal Street in the French Quarter, 2019

== Costumes and masks ==
In New Orleans, costumes and masks are seldom publicly worn by non-Krewe members on the days before Fat Tuesday (other than at parties), but are frequently worn on Mardi Gras. Laws against concealing one's identity with a mask are suspended for the day. Banks are closed, and some businesses and other places with security concerns (such as convenience stores) post signs asking people to remove their masks before entering.

== Throws ==
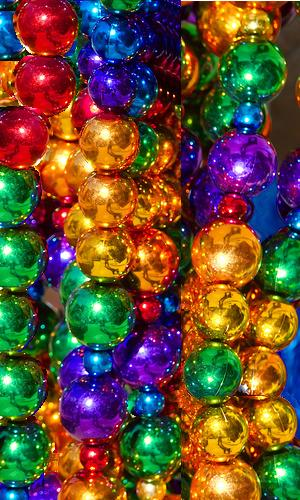
Mardi Gras beads

A 'throw' is the collective term used for the objects that are thrown from floats to parade-goers. Until the 1960s, the most common form was multi-colored strings of glass beads made in Czechoslovakia.

Glass beads were supplanted by less expensive and more durable plastic beads, first from Hong Kong, then from Taiwan, and more recently from China. Lower-cost beads and toys allow float-riders to purchase greater quantities, and throws have become more numerous and common.

In the 1990s, many people lost interest in small, cheap beads, often leaving them where they landed on the ground. Larger, more elaborate metallic beads and strands with figures of animals, people, or other objects have become the sought-after throws. David Redmond's 2005 film of cultural and economic globalization, Mardi Gras: Made in China, follows the production and distribution of beads from a small factory in Fuzhou, China to the streets of New Orleans during Carnival. The publication of Redmon's book, Beads, Bodies, and Trash: Public Sex, Global Labor, and the Disposability of Mardi Gras, follows up on the documentary by providing an ethnographic analysis of the social harms, the pleasures, and the consequences of the toxicity that Mardi Gras beads produce.

In addition to the toxicity of tons of plastic, eye injuries from Mardi Gras parade throws are commonplace, and more severe injuries—such as a fractured skull in an infant struck by a coconut—have also been known to occur.

== Other Mardi Gras traditions ==
=== Social clubs ===
New Orleans Social Clubs or Gentlemen's Clubs play a very large part in the Mardi Gras celebration. The oldest is The Boston Club (third oldest in the United States), founded in 1841 as a place for its members to congregate and partake in the fashionable card game of Boston, Rex Royalty is chosen from among its ranks. The Pickwick Club began as the public face of The Mistick Krewe, but later officially severed ties, still presents debutante balls annually. The Louisiana Club or officially the Louisiana Debating and Literary Association is still the public facade of the Knights of Momus, while the Stratford Club serves as the face of the Order of Mythras.

The two main Mardi Gras parades, Zulu and Rex, are both social club parades. Zulu is a mostly African-American club and Rex is mostly Caucasian. Social clubs host Mardi Gras balls, starting in late January. At these social balls, the queen of the parade (usually a young woman between the ages of 18 and 21, not married and in high school or college) and the king (an older male member of the club) present themselves and their court of maids (young women aged 16 to 21), and different divisions of younger children with small roles in the ball and parade, such as a theme-beformal neighborhood Carnival club ball at local bar room.

After their exclusion from Rex, in 1909 Black Creole and other African American New Orleanians, led by a mutual aid group known as "The Tramps", adorned William Storey with a tin can crown and banana stalk scepter and named him King Zulu. This display was meant as a mockery of Rex's overstated pageantry but in time, Zulu became a grand parade in its own right. By 1949, as an indication of Zulu's increase in prestige, the krewe named New Orleans' native son Louis Armstrong as its king.

Being a member of the court requires much preparation, usually months ahead. Women and girls must have dress fittings as early as the May before the parade, as the season of social balls allows little time between each parade. These balls are generally by invitation only. Balls are held at a variety of venues in the city, large and small, depending on the size and budget of the organization. In the late 19th and early 20th century, the French Opera House was a leading venue for New Orleans balls. From the mid 20th century until Hurricane Katrina the Municipal Auditorium was the city's most famous site for Carnival balls. In more recent years, most are at the ballrooms of various hotels throughout the city. The largest "Super Krewes" use larger venues; Bacchus the Morial Convention Center and Endymion the Superdome.

=== Doubloons ===
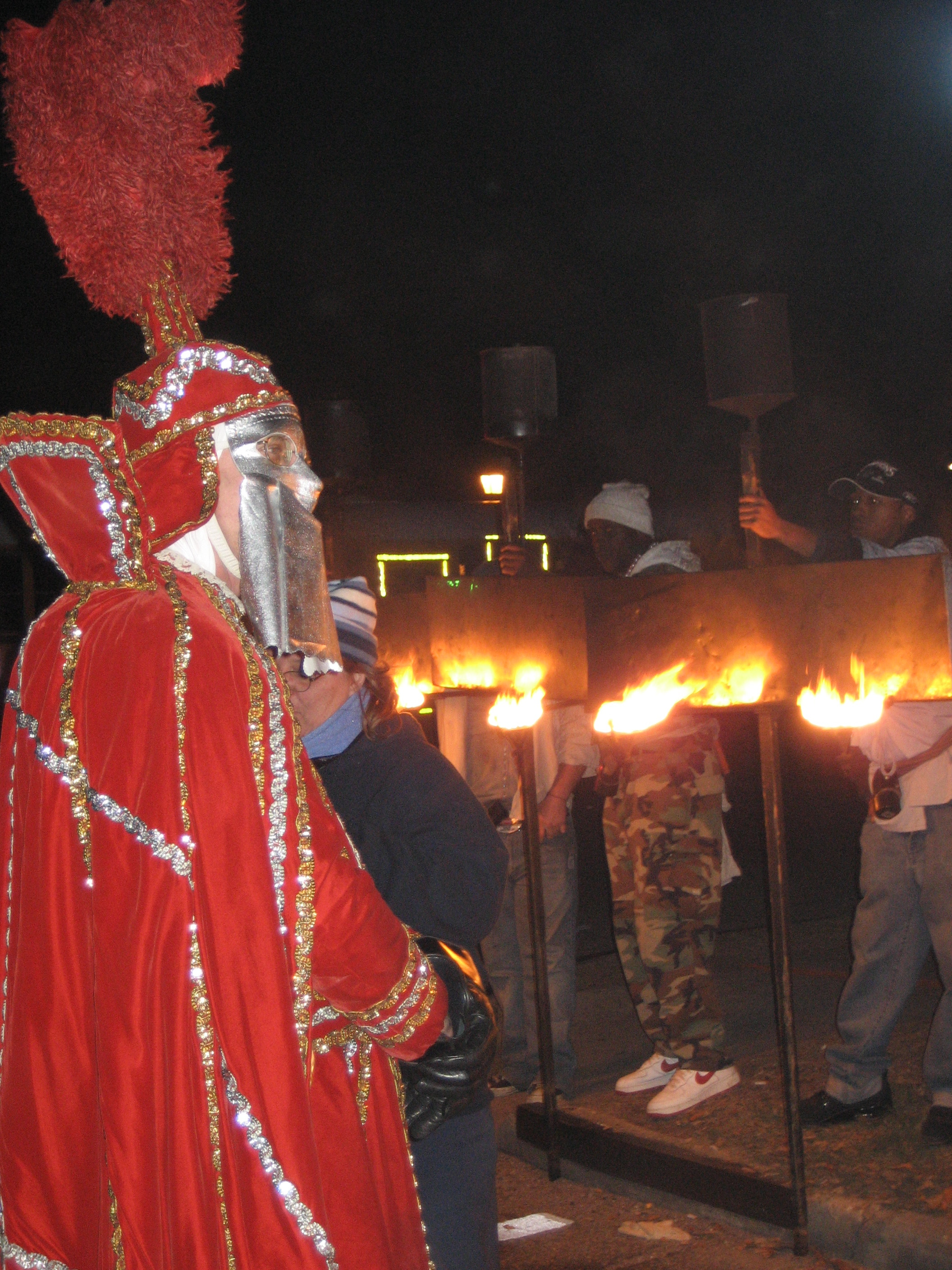
Carriers with lit flambeaux on Napoleon Avenue, just before the start of a parade, 2007

One of the many Mardi Gras throws which krewes fling into the crowds, doubloons are large coins, either wood or metal, made in Mardi Gras colors. Artist H. Alvin Sharpe created the modern doubloon for The School of Design (the actual name of the Rex organization). According to the krewe history, in January 1959 Sharpe arrived at the offices of the captain of the krewe with a handful of aluminum discs. Upon entering the office, he threw the doubloons into the captain's face to prove that they would be safe to throw from the floats. Standard krewe doubloons usually portray the Krewe's emblem, name, and founding date on one side, and the theme and year of the parade and ball on the other side. Royalty and members of the court may throw specialty doubloons, such as the special Riding Lieutenant doubloons given out by men on horseback in the Rex parade. In the last decade, krewes have minted doubloons specific to each float. Krewes also mint special doubloons of cloisonné or pure silver for its members. They never throw these from the floats. Original Rex doubloons are valuable, but it is nearly impossible for aficionados to find a certified original doubloon. The School of Design did not begin dating their doubloons until a few years after their introduction.

=== Flambeau carriers ===
The flambeau (torch) carrier originally, before electric lighting, served as a beacon for New Orleans parade goers to better enjoy the spectacle of night parades. The first flambeau carriers were slaves. Today, the flambeaux are a connection to the New Orleans version of Carnival and a valued contribution. Many people view flambeau-carrying as a kind of performance art – a valid assessment given the wild gyrations and flourishes displayed by experienced flambeau carriers in a parade. Many individuals are descended from a long line of carriers. Parades that commonly feature flambeaux include Babylon, Bacchus, Chaos, Le Krewe d'Etat, Druids, Endymion, Hermes, Krewe of Muses, Krewe of Orpheus, Krewe of Proteus, Saturn, and Sparta. Flambeaux are powered by naphtha, a highly flammable aromatic. It is a tradition, when the flambeau carriers pass by during a parade, to toss quarters to them in thanks for carrying the lights of Carnival. In the 21st century, though, handing dollar bills is common.

=== Rex ===
Rex was formed to create a daytime spectacle not only for the residents of the city but for special guest Grand Duke Alexei Alexandrovich of Russia. The Rex motto is, "Pro Bono Publico—for the public good."

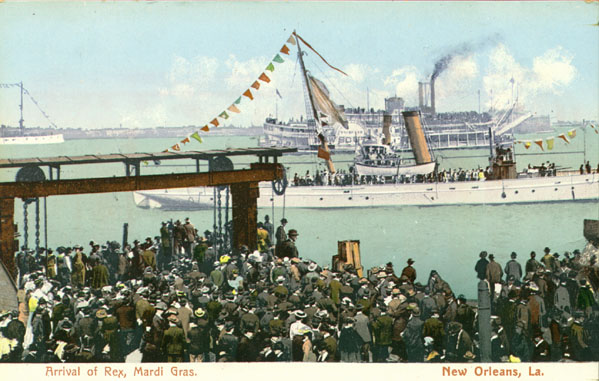
Arrival of Rex, monarch of Mardi Gras, as seen on an early 20th-century postcard

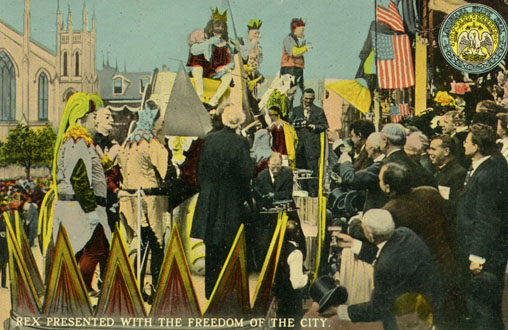
Rex, presented with freedom of the city; early 20th century postcard

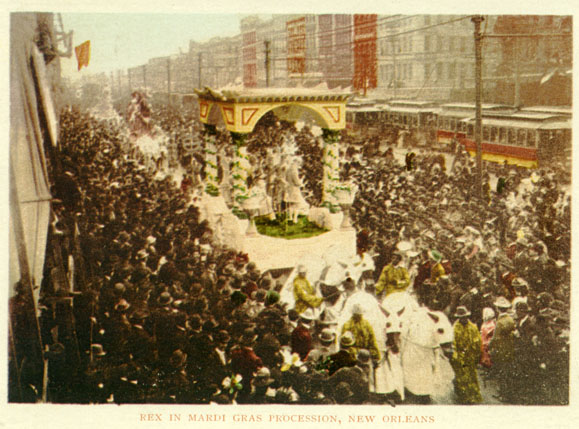
Rex in procession down Canal Street; postcard from c. 1900

The Rex pageant, Mardi Gras Day, New Orleans, La., c. 1907

=== New Orleans Zulu or Mardi Gras Coconut ===
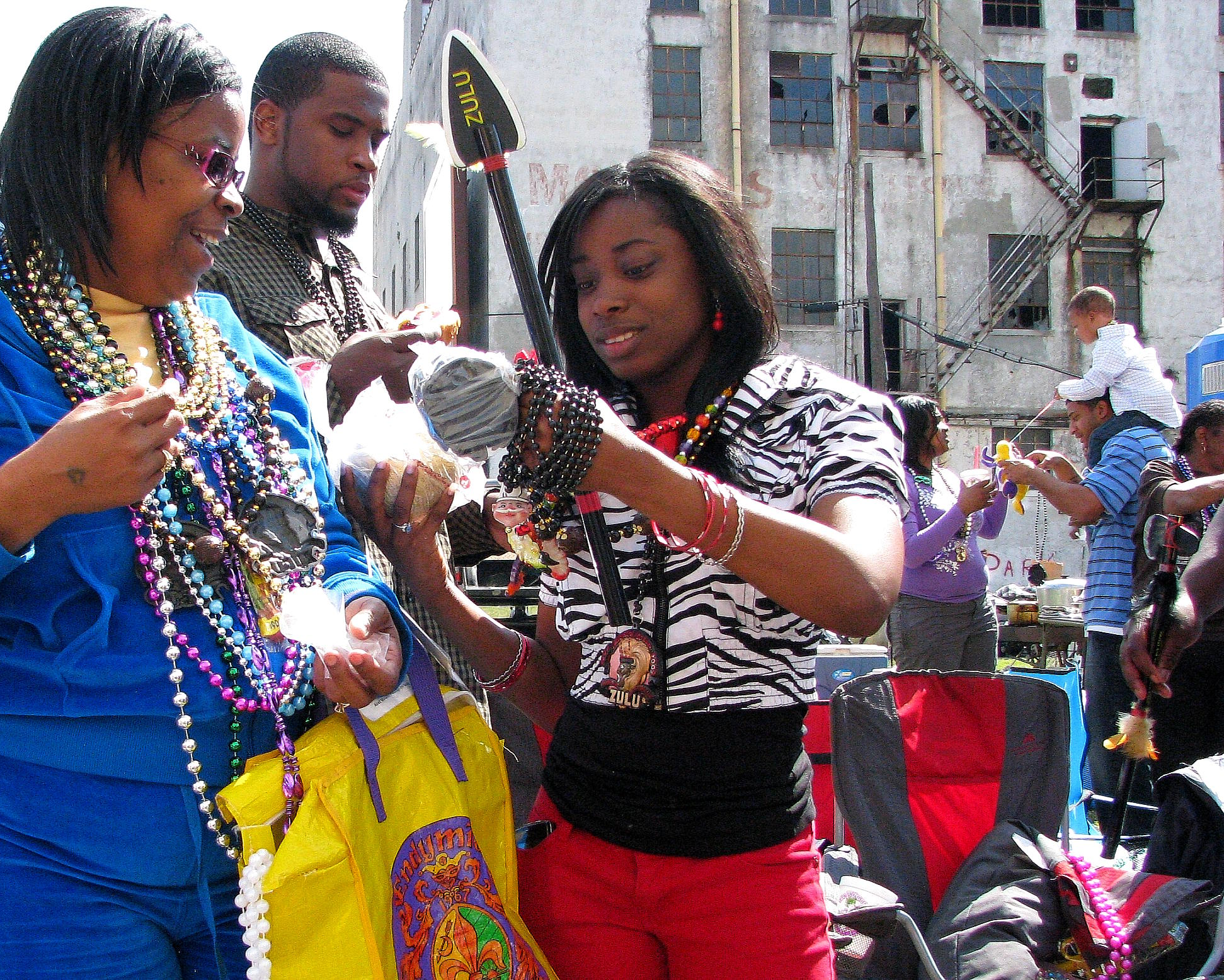
Revelers on Basin Street examine their parade catches, including a Zulu Coconut, 2009

One of the most famous and the most sought after throws, is the Zulu Coconut also known as the Golden Nugget and the Mardi Gras Coconut. The coconut is mentioned as far back as 1910, where they were given in a natural "hairy" state. The coconut was thrown as a cheap alternative, especially in 1910 when the bead throws were made of glass. Before the Krewe of Zulu threw coconuts, they threw walnuts that were painted gold. This is where the name "Golden Nugget" originally came from. It is thought that Zulu switched from walnuts to coconuts in the early 1920s when a local painter, Lloyd Lucus, started to paint coconuts. Most of the coconuts have two decorations. The first is painted gold with added glitter, and the second is painted like the famous black Zulu faces. In 1988, the city forbade Zulu from throwing coconuts due to the risk of injury; they are now handed to onlookers rather than thrown. In the year 2000, a local electronics engineer, Willie Clark, introduced an upgraded version of the classic, naming them Mardi Gras Coconuts. These new coconuts were first used by the club in 2002, giving the souvenirs to royalty and city notables.

=== Ojen liqueur ===
Aguardiente de Ojén (es), or simply "ojen" ("OH-hen") as it is known in English, is a Spanish anisette traditionally consumed during the New Orleans Mardi Gras festivities. In Ojén, the original Spanish town where it is produced, production stopped for years, but it started again in early 2014 by means of the distillery company Dominique Mertens Impex. S.L.

=== House floats ===
In 2021 due to the cancellation of parades due to the COVID-19 pandemic, the practice of decorating homes in the style of parade floats emerged as an alternative, dubbed "home floats" or "house floats". The concept was popularized immediately after the announcement that in-person parades would be prohibited, stemming from a post on Twitter by Megan Boudreaux. She later established a formal "Krewe of House Floats", with participants being listed in an interactive map on its website so local residents can tour them. The revised celebration was nicknamed "Yardi Gras" by residents. Even the dog parade, held by the Mystic Krewe of Mardi Paws in Covington, opted to make "dog house floats' in 2021.

=== Public nudity ===
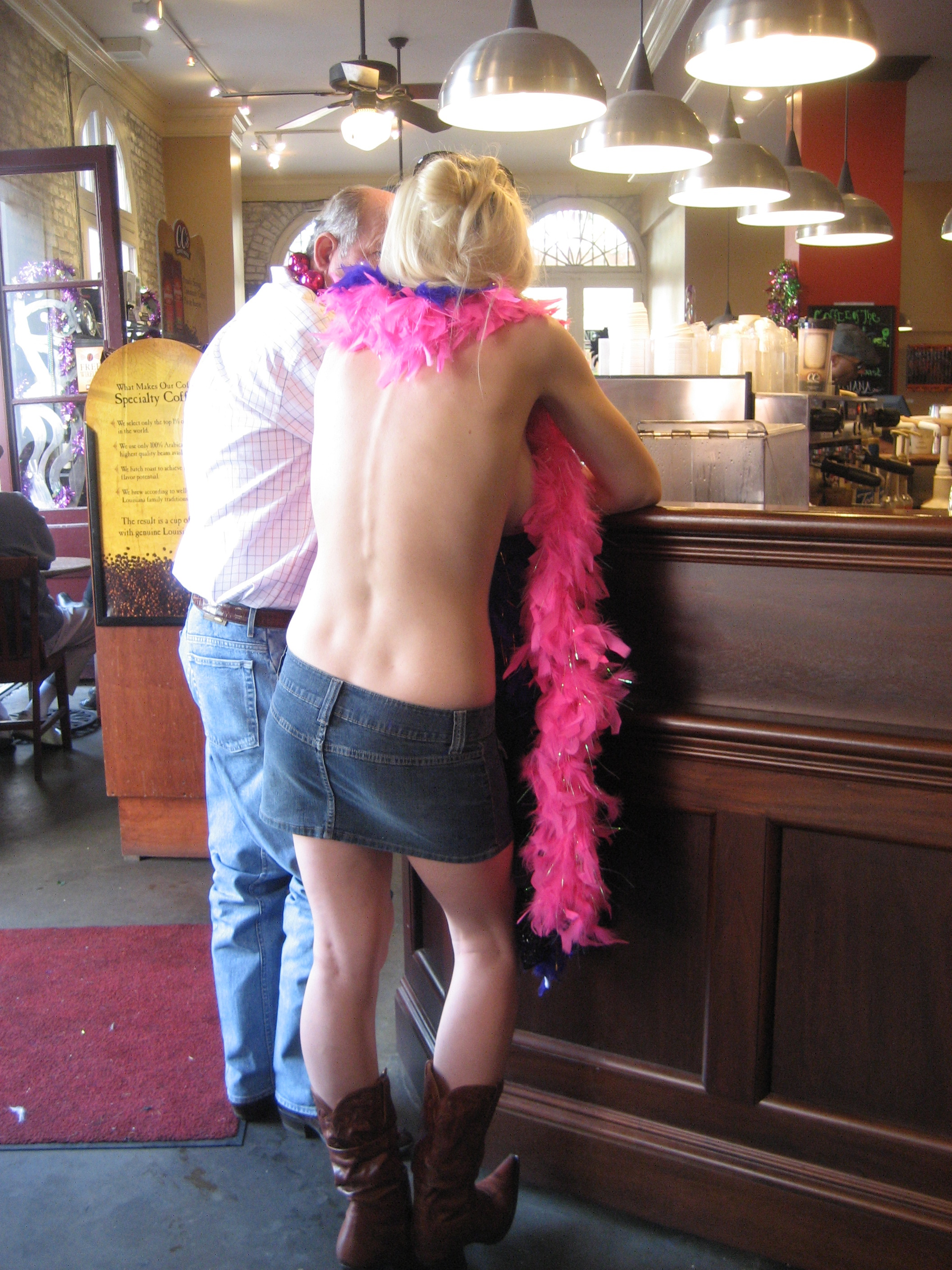
A topless woman at a French Quarter coffee house, Mardi Gras afternoon, 2009

Wearing less clothing than considered decent in other contexts during Mardi Gras has been documented since 1889, when the Times-Democrat decried the "degree of immodesty exhibited by nearly all female masqueraders seen on the streets." Risqué costumes, including body painting, are fairly common. The practice of exposing female breasts in exchange for Mardi Gras beads, however, was mostly limited to tourists in the upper Bourbon Street area. In the crowded streets of the French Quarter, generally avoided by locals on Mardi Gras Day, flashers on balconies cause crowds to form on the streets.

In the last decades of the 20th century, the rise in producing commercial videotapes catering to voyeurs helped encourage a tradition of women baring their breasts in exchange for beads and trinkets. Social scientists studying "ritual disrobement" found, at Mardi Gras 1991, 1,200 instances of body-baring in exchange for beads or other favors.

== See also ==
- Mardi Gras Mambo
- French Quarter Festival
- Fantasy Fest
- Boeuf gras
