= Le Krewe d'Etat =

Satirical New Orleans Carnival group

- Abbreviation: KDE
- Formation: 1996; 30 years ago
- Type: All Male Carnival Krewe
- Location: Uptown, New Orleans, LA.
- Members: 450

Krewe d'Etat, New Orleans Carnival 2017

Le Krewe d'Etat is a satirical New Orleans Carnival Krewe.

== History and formation ==
Krewe d'Etat's first inaugural parade was in 1998. Prior to organizing their own parade, a member of the krewe known simply as Unknown Spokesman said the group had covertly infiltrated Pegasus with some floats of their own. The krewe has historically paraded on the Friday prior to Fat Tuesday, immediately following the Mystic Krewe of Hermes. The parade route originally started at Magazine and Napoleon but now follows the traditional route that starts at Jefferson and Magazine, heading downtown to Magazine and Napoleon, then towards the lake on Napoleon to St. Charles, then heading downtown towards Lee Circle, around Lee Circle, and finally onto Canal Street. The procession includes traditional floats, Lieutenants on horseback, and flambeaux carriers. In 2013, d'Etat had 23 floats and roughly 450 riders.

d'Etat's motto is "Vivite ut Vehatis. Vehite ut Vevatis," which roughly translates to "Live to Ride, Ride to Live."

== Membership ==
Membership is open, but the Krewe has elected to keep the organization small.

== Parade ==
Krewe d'Etat parades on Vendredi Gras after Krewe of Hermes on the Uptown route. The Skeleton Walking Krewe hands out the D'Etat Gazette (Carnival Bulletin) leading the parade which provides an overview of the floats.

Le Krewe d'Etat utilize flambeaux to light the parade route.

Krewe d'Etat is notable for being the first Mardi Gras parade to throw blinking beads.

=== Parade themes ===
The Krewe decides a new theme for their parade annually ("raison d'etre"), and it, just like The Dictator's identity, remains confidential. The parade floats are intended to lampoon current events, politicians, socialites, business moguls, etc.

- 2026 The Dic Blasts Off
- 2025 D'Etat's Heroes and Zeros
- 2024 d'Etat Rocks the Boat
- 2023 D'Good, D'Bad, D'Etat
- 2022 The Dic Throws D'Bones
- 2021 D'Etat Goes Viral (no parade due to COVID-19 pandemic)
- 2020 The Dic Goes To Mardi Gras
- 2019 Paging Dr. d'Etat
- 2018 DicMA
- 2017 Zoo d'Etat
- 2016 The Dictator Plays Games
- 2015 Frid'Etat the 13th
- 2014 D.U.I.
- 2013 The Dictator's Reading Room
- 2012 d'Etat Tells It Like It Is
- 2011 Le Krewe D'Etat's Wide Woild of Sports
- 2010 d'Etat's Inferno
- 2009 The Dictator Does Broadway
- 2008 Le Krewe d'Etat's Dirty Dishes
- 2007 KDTV in Dictavision
- 2006 d'Olympics d'Etat
- 2005 Tarot d'Etat
- 2004 Malice in Wonderland
- 2003 Tales Told by Idiots
- 2002 Rock Around d'Etat
- 2001 d'Etat.com
- 2000 Cinema d'Etat
- 1999 Dictator's Circus
- 1998 Looziana Scandals and Scoundrels

=== Dictology ===
Le Krewe d'Etat eschews monarchy in favor of a figurehead known simply as "The Dictator" whose identity is held secret. The Dictator's "court" includes the Kingfish, the Special Man, the Minister of Misinformation, the Keeper of the Bones and the High Priest.
