= Mardi Gras Doubloons =

Coin-like Mardi Gras throws commemorating Mardi Gras Krewes

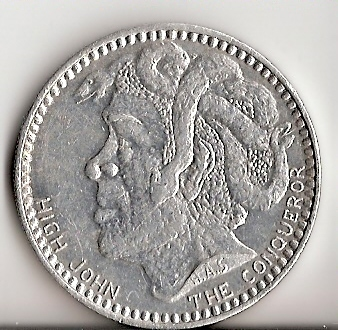
Example of a Mardi Gras Doubloon, from the Krewe of Zulu

Mardi Gras Doubloons are Mardi Gras throws shaped like coins that commemorate various Mardi Gras Krewes. They are typically made of aluminum and are thrown from floats in carnival parades. The first doubloons used as throws from parades of Mardi Gras Krewes date to 1960, and these early doubloons are collectible.

Mardi Gras doubloons were first created by New Orleans artist and entrepreneur H. Alvin Sharpe in 1959. Sharpe had his own metal dies for striking the doubloons from aluminum blanks. He presented a design to Darwin Schreiver Fenner, who was the captain of the Krewe of Rex, the leading Mardi Gras organization of the time. As a result of the presentation, Schreiver personally financed production of 3000 doubloons for the 1960 Mardi Gras year, although the Krewe of Rex produced 80,000 undated doubloons using Sharpe's design, all minted by a firm in Ohio.

Sharpe's design was larger but lighter than United States silver dollars, rendering them safe as Mardi Gras throws. The size was similar to Spanish doubloons, providing public appeal and giving rise to the name. This original design depicted a bust of Rex the King of Carnival on one side of the doubloon with the arms of the School of Design (the organization that stages the Rex Mardi Gras parade) on the other side. The undated design was intentional so that the doubloons could be used as Mardi Gras throws in subsequent years.

In 1964, New Orleans businessmen John Barr and Bill Cox founded the Barco Mint Company to locally produce Mardi Gras doubloons. In 1996, Barco Mint changed its name to the New Orleans Mint. It currently produces Mardi Gras doubloons in addition to commemorative doubloons for other purposes. In recent years, some Mardi Gras organizations have also used producers in China to mint their doubloons, although New Orleans Mint remains dominant.

Mardi Gras doubloons were common Mardi Gras throws by the late 1960s. The typical design for common aluminum throw doubloons has the emblem of the Mardi Gras krewe with its name and year on the front side, and this side generally does not change from year-to-year. The back side of the doubloon depicts the theme of the particular Mardi Gras krewe for that year. Over the years of production, significant variety in shape and color came about. Some are made of materials other than aluminum. The common aluminum doubloon throws went through a period of significant over-production, which has limited their value. However, ones made of silver or cloisonné often have value in excess of the metal itself.

== Gallery ==
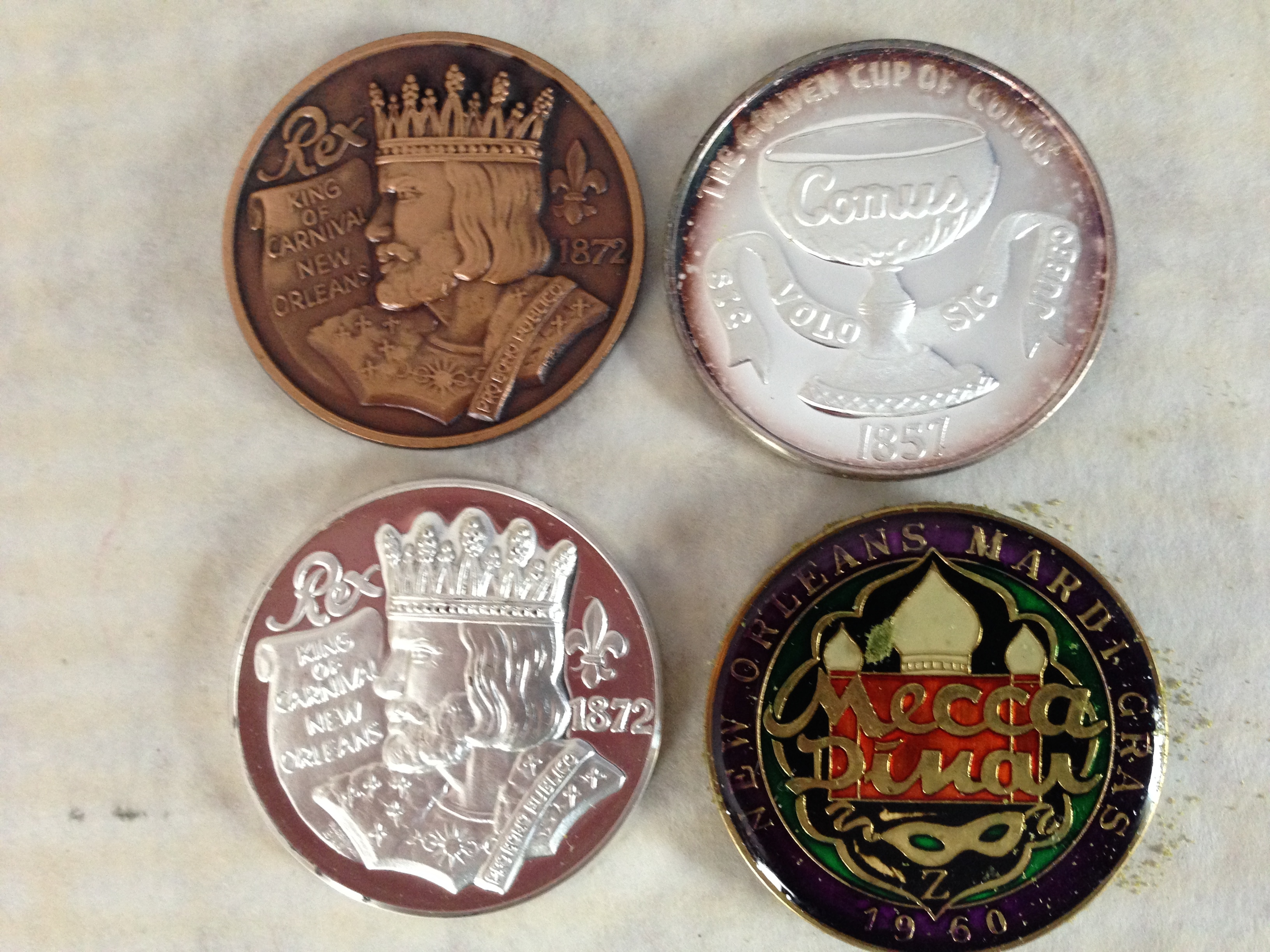
Examples of Mardi Gras doubloons of the cloisonné variety

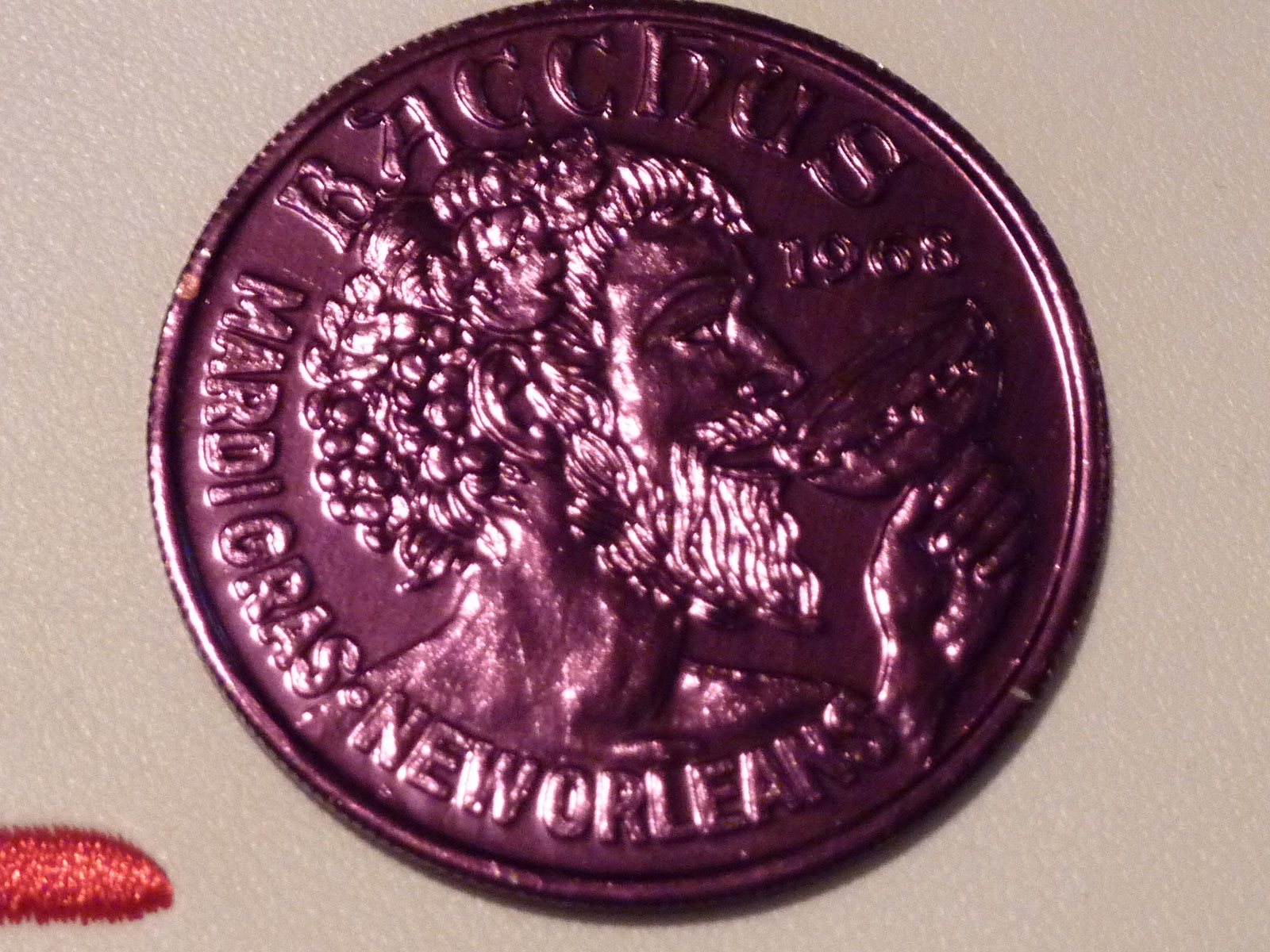
Doubloon from the Krewe of Bacchus

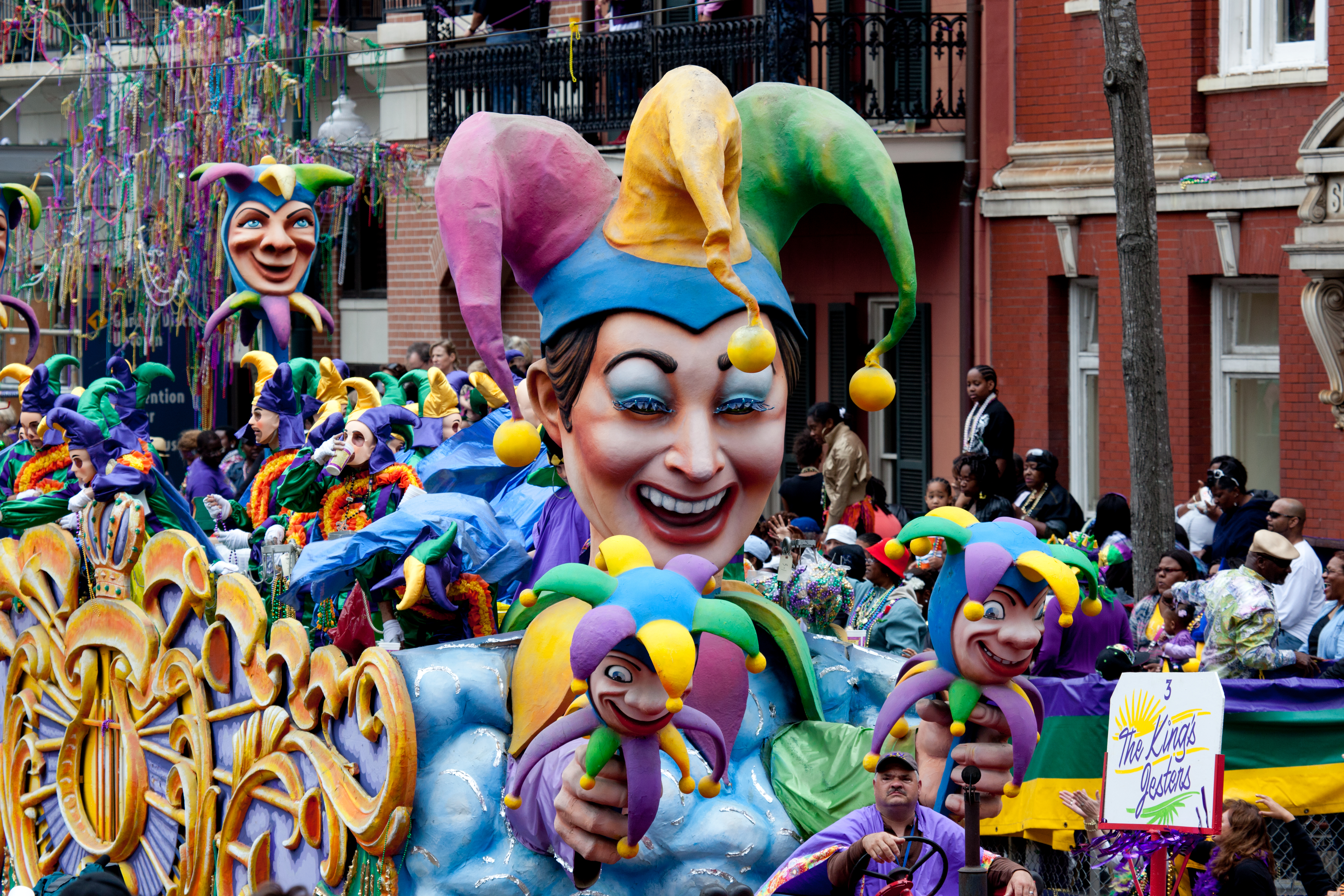
Doubloons are thrown from Mardi Gras floats such as this one

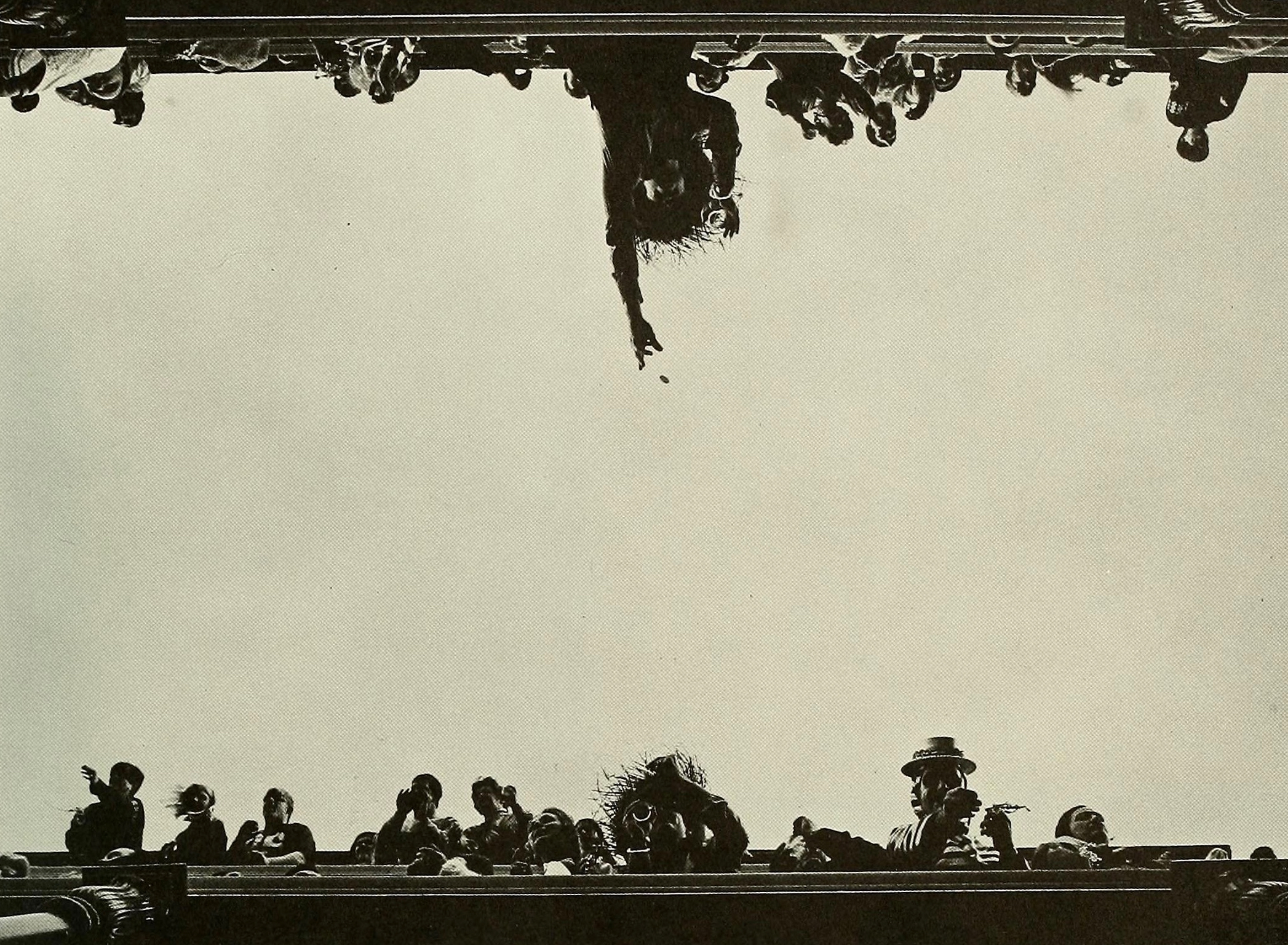
Artistic view of a Mardi Gras krewe member throwing a Mardi Gras Doubloon

== See also ==
- Exonumia
