= Mystic Krewe of Hermes =

New Orleans Mardi Gras Krewe

- Formation: 1937
- Founded at: New Orleans, Louisiana, United States
- Type: Mardi Gras Krewe
- Legal status: Active
- Purpose: Mardi Gras celebrations and charitable activities
- Headquarters: New Orleans, Louisiana, United States
- Location: New Orleans, Louisiana
- Region served: New Orleans metropolitan area
- Members: 800
- Official language: English
- Affiliations: Kern Studios
- Website: mystickreweofhermes.com

The Mystic Krewe of Hermes is a New Orleans Carnival krewe that held its first evening parade in 1937. The Hermes Evening Parade takes place on the Friday night before Mardi Gras. Also known as Hermes, the krewe is renowned for its traditional illuminated floats, spectacular throws, and charitable activities. It is the oldest continuous nighttime Carnival parade in New Orleans. Additionally, on the Friday before Mardi Gras, the krewe hosts the Hermes Walking Parade in the French Quarter.

== Creation and history ==
In 1936, while the United States and New Orleans faced the effects of the Great Depression, a group of local businessmen created a plan to draw more tourists to the city by organizing a Carnival parade on the Friday night before Mardi Gras, thereby extending the Carnival season by several days. As a result, in 1937, the Mystic Krewe of Hermes was established and hosted its first night parade with illuminated floats.

The krewe's name was suggested by F. Edward Herbert, a newspaper reporter who later became a congressman. In Greek mythology, Hermes was the god of commerce and the protector of travelers and he was viewed as an appropriate symbol for the new krewe.

Early Hermes parades featured floats reused from the recently defunct Krewe of Ancient Druids.

In 2009, Antoine's, a historic restaurant in the French Quarter, opened the Hermes Bar. The bar is decorated with Hermes photos and memorabilia.

In celebration of the krewe's 76th anniversary in 2014, the Presbytère museum in New Orleans opened an exhibit highlighting Hermes’ history titled “King of Hermes, The Diamond Jubilee.” The display featured ball gowns, invitations, parade throws, and float sketches. The exhibit was curated from collections of krewe members, the Louisiana State Museum Carnival Collection, and Kern Studios, the company responsible for many Mardi Gras floats. Hermes's artistic director at the time, Henri Schindler, also published a history of the krewe to mark the 75th anniversary.

A key figure in guiding the krewe during the late 20th and early 21st centuries was James J. Coleman Jr., a notable New Orleans businessman and philanthropist. He was known for leading krewe festivities and mentoring members. Coleman died in 2019.

On May 8, 2025, the New Orleans City Council passed a resolution declaring that “the Friday before Mardi Gras Day shall henceforth be known as ‘Hermes Friday.'" The resolution was approved unanimously. It highlighted Hermes’ historic, civic, and economic contributions to the city, its classical and innovative float designs, and the krewe's philanthropic activities.

Since at least the 1970s, Hermes has used a large warehouse at 418-436 Sixth Street in New Orleans as its “den” to store floats. In 2025, the krewe purchased neighboring properties at 2901 and 2903 Tchoupitoulas Street to expand its operations. Later that year, the city approved the demolition of the warehouse building at 2903 Tchoupitoulas Street.

== Membership ==
When it was founded, the krewe set itself apart from traditional krewes by opening membership to individuals of “means and notable standing in the community,” rather than to those with old-line ancestry like Rex, Comus, and other older krewes. The original krewe had between 150 and 200 members. By 2023, the membership had grown to over 800. Membership mainly comes from the fields of law, medicine, and business. As a mystic krewe, members' identities are kept secret. This secrecy also applies to the annual king, who stays masked at all events and whose name is concealed from the press.

== Public Events ==
=== Hermes Evening Parade ===
The Hermes aesthetic has always been rooted in classical design. Each year's Evening Parade features a different theme carefully chosen to tell a story related to the krewe, Carnival, or New Orleans. Float design begins with a pen-and-ink sketch, which serves as the basis for float builders at Kern Studios. The results are beautiful, handcrafted floats that reflect the parade's theme. In 2014, writing in New Orleans Magazine, columnist Errol Laborde said the Hermes parade “is always visually exciting; it’s always one of Carnival’s most glamorous.”

Hermes was the first krewe to use attached lighting on its floats. Its use of colored neon on floats was also innovative. It was also the first to use lighted costumes for krewe members on floats.

On the Friday evening before Mardi Gras, the parade route traditionally begins uptown at 5:30 pm at the intersection of Magazine Street and Jefferson Avenue. The parade then moves east along Magazine to Napoleon Avenue, where it turns north. At St. Charles Avenue, it turns east again. The parade follows St. Charles, goes around Harmony Circle, and then continues along St. Charles. At Canal Street, the parade turns left and heads to Baronne Street, where it ends.

In 2025, estimates of the crowd size for the parade exceeded 300,000 people.

Always known for its extravagant throws, the Hermes krewe members tossed 100 strands of real pearls in the 2019 parade. Local jeweler Franco Valobra provided the necklaces, valued at about $1,500. That same year, popular throws included winged and glowing headbands, wings that can be attached to shoes, and items that coincide with the “Court Music of Louis XIV” theme.

In 2022, former Saints football player Steve Gleason was invited to participate in the Hermes parade. Gleason, who was diagnosed with ALS, started a charity called Team Gleason to support ALS research. With assistance from his caregivers and supporters, Gleason moved along the parade route in his motorized wheelchair, cheered on by onlookers.

The theme for the 2025 parade, “Visions of Joan d’Arc,” celebrated the 15th-century woman warrior, religious figure, and symbol of French heritage. Her efforts to save the City of Orleans in France in 1429 were a notable achievement. In recognition of the theme, the Krewe de Jeanne d’Arc, a French Quarter walking parade, was invited to participate in the Hermes parade.

=== Hermes - Iris Toast ===
The Mystic Krewe of Hermes and the Krewe of Iris hold a traditional joint gathering to kick off their Mardi Gras celebrations on the Friday morning before Mardi Gras at the corner of St. Louis Street and Royal Street in the French Quarter at 10:45 am. Krewe officials and spectators raise their glasses to toast the “Messengers to the Gods,” Hermes and Iris.

=== Hermes Walking Parade ===
At 2 pm on the Friday before Mardi Gras, the Hermes Walking Parade begins in the French Quarter. Hermes members, dressed in business suits and krewe-logo ties, gather at St. Peter and Chartres Streets and march through the quarter, throwing beads and doubloons to the thousands of spectators. The parade is led by marching bands with the Hermes king riding in a horse-drawn carriage.

== Private Events ==
The annual Hermes Grand Ball occurs on the Thursday night before the Hermes Friday parades. A champagne reception is held before the ball, followed by a supper dance.

Guests wear white tie and ball gowns. The evening features appearances by the King and Queen of Hermes, along with their royal court, dressed in elaborate gowns and costumes. Printed invitations and programs for the event, designed by local artists, are lavish and detailed.

While the Grand Ball is usually covered by the local press, the 1958 ball attracted extra attention when Zsa Zsa Gabor, a vibrant and glamorous actress, attended as the guest of New Orleans Mayor deLesseps S. “Chep” Morrison. Her appearance caused excitement at the ball as krewe members shouted her name as she passed by.

== Charitable Activities ==
Under the leadership of James J. Coleman Jr., the krewe established Hermes’ Beyond the Parade Foundation. The foundation supports first responders in New Orleans. It promotes long-term solutions to address violent crime in the region. Workforce development, mentorship opportunities, and early childhood education are also areas of focus.

The Police and Justice Foundation of New Orleans presented Hermes with its Corporate Responsibility Award at a 2016 luncheon.

In 2017, the foundation partnered the Police and Justice Foundation of New Orleans to donate $25,000 worth of equipment to the city's police department. The funds were used to buy foul-weather suits for mounted and motorcycle officers. The foundation also donated a new horse to the department's Mounted Unit. The horse was named JC, after Coleman.
