= Krewe of Bacchus =

Group in the New Orleans Mardi Gras

- The Bacchagator, one of the Krewe of Bacchus's signature floats
- Abbreviation: KoB
- Named after: Bacchus
- Formation: 1968; 58 years ago
- Founders: Owen Edward Brennan, Sr., Owen Brennan, Jr
- Founded at: New Orleans, LA.
- Type: Carnival Krewe
- Location: New Orleans, LA.
- Website: kreweofbacchus.org

Krewe of Bacchus is a New Orleans Mardi Gras super krewe.

== History and formation ==
The Krewe of Bacchus is an organization founded in 1968 by Owen Brennan, Jr. as one of the first modern "superkrewes," defined by their size, spectacular floats, and celebrity riders. It is named for Bacchus, the Roman god of wine.

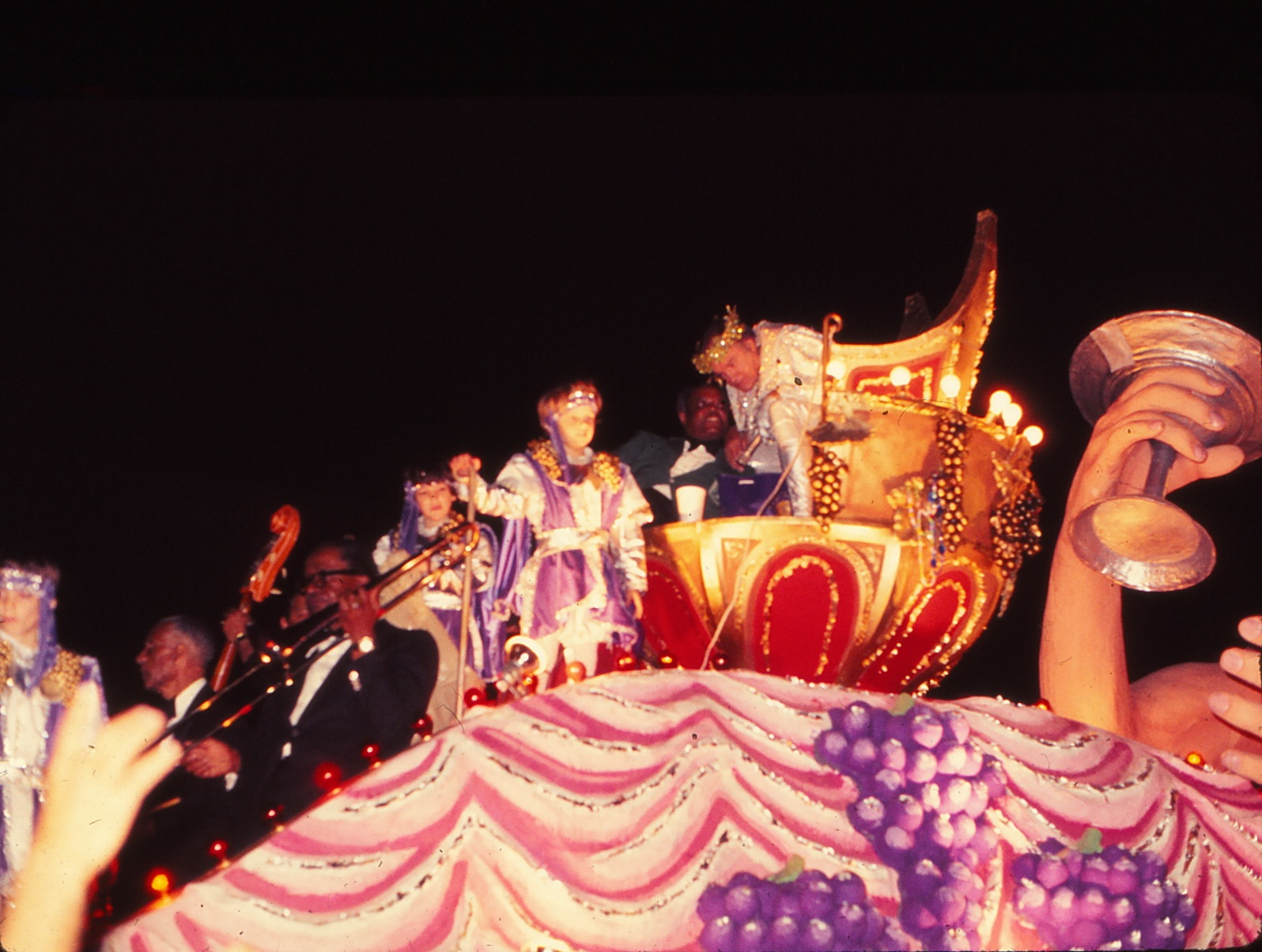
Bob Hope as King of Bacchus in 1973

Bacchus was the first krewe to have celebrities appear as part of the parade. Past celebrities who have served as Bacchus include: Steve Guttenberg, Danny Kaye, William Shatner, Lorne Greene, Charlton Heston, Jackie Gleason, Bob Hope, New Orleans' own Pete Fountain, JK Simmons, Phil Harris, Henry Winkler, Glen Campbell, Jon Lovitz, and more recently, Elijah Wood, Sean Astin, Michael Keaton, James Gandolfini, Gerald McRaney in 1992, Harry Connick, Jr. in 1993, Hulk Hogan in 2008, Val Kilmer in 2009, Drew Brees in 2010, Will Ferrell in 2012, Anthony Mackie in 2016 and Jim Caviezel in 2017, Jensen Ackles (whose wife, Danneel Ackles is a native of Lafayette and named after New Orleans' Danneel Street) in 2019, Adam Devine in 2023, Kevin Dillon in 2024 and Shaquille O'Neal in 2025.

Ron Howard's reign as Bacchus was canceled by the 1979 New Orleans Police Department strike which scuttled all official Mardi Gras parades within the city limits. His Happy Days co-star, Henry Winkler, reigned in 1977.

The only non-celebrity to reign as Bacchus was Sgt. John McKeel Jr. (1981), who was held captive for 444 days during the Iran Hostage Crisis with 51 others.

== Membership ==
The 2020 Krewe included more than 1,600 members, and its parade featured 33 floats, including its signature floats: the Bacchasaurus, a giant dinosaur; the Bacchawhoppa, an equally large whale; Bacchagator, an enormous alligator; and Bacchatality, a three-float procession made up of restaurateurs. The Baccha-Amore, a love themed float, was introduced in 2008. For the 50th Anniversary, the Krewe introduced two new signature floats: the BacchaKong Family and the Bacchaneer. In 2026 Baby Bacchawhoppa will be joining the Bacchawhoppa float as a tandem addition to that signature float. In keeping with tradition, "Bacchus beads," Bacchus Socks, and doubloons are thrown to revelers from the floats.

After a long absence from prime time television, Bacchus returned to the New Orleans airwaves in 2009, when NBC affiliate WDSU produced a five-hour live broadcast of the parade and ensuing party at New Orleans Morial Convention Center. The Bacchus Rendezvous, the krewe's ball, has been held at the Convention Center since 1994 after it was held at the now-demolished Rivergate Convention Center from 1969 to 1993.

== Parade ==
The Krewe of Bacchus parades during the New Orleans Mardi Gras, on the Sunday evening before Mardi Gras.

=== Parade themes ===
- 1969 The Best Things in Life
- 1970 Remember When
- 1971 Bacchus Salutes Mardi Gras
- 1972 Bacchus Book of Horrors
- 1973 Bacchus Goes to the Movies
- 1974 Bacchus Reads the Comics
- 1975 The Circus Parade
- 1976 Spirit of '76
- 1977 Happily Ever After
- 1978 Monarchs and Memories
- 1979 The Undersea World of Bac-chu-steau (parade cancelled due to New Orleans Police Department strike)
- 1980 The Undersea World of Bac-chu-steau
- 1981 The Old Testament
- 1982 American Heroes and Heroines
- 1983 Bacchus Presents: Jewels of the Zodiac
- 1984 Rivers of the World
- 1985 In Vino Veritas
- 1986 New Orleans, We Love You
- 1987 Bacchanal
- 1988 20 Years of Bacchus
- 1989 Sing Along with Bacchus
- 1990 Our Planet Earth
- 1991 The Bacchus Gallery of Art
- 1992 What a Way to Go
- 1993 Silver Jubilee
- 1994 I am Sending You a Big Bouquet of Roses
- 1995 Color My World
- 1996 Games People Play
- 1997 Bacchus' Comic Book Heroes
- 1998 Where Y'at Dawlin'
- 1999 A Tribute to Jules Verne
- 2000 Milestones to the Millennium
- 2001 Denizens of the Deep
- 2002 Bacchus Journeys Through Africa
- 2003 Bacchus' Fantasy World
- 2004 Bacchus Magical Mystery Tour
- 2005 Bacchus Super Sunday
- 2006 Bacchus Follows the Yellow Brick Road
- 2007 Through the Eyes of a Child
- 2008 40 Years of Fun
- 2009 Creatures of the Imagination
- 2010 Love is in the Air
- 2011 Bacchus Salutes America's Greatest Generation
- 2012 Bacchus Celebrates the Louisiana Bicentennial
- 2013 Bacchus Sails the Seven Seas
- 2014 Bacchus Explores Our Sportman's Paradise
- 2015 Children's Stories that Live Forever
- 2016 Flights of Delight
- 2017 Bacchus Salutes the Saints 50th
- 2018 Bacchus Celebrates Its Golden
- 2019 Starring Louisiana
- 2020 Wild, Wild West
- 2021 Parade cancelled due to COVID-19 pandemic
- 2022 From the Heart
- 2023 Throw Me Something Mister
- 2024 Take A Number, Please
- 2025 Louisiana Fairs and Festivals
- 2026 Bacchus Celebrates America 250

=== Celebrity Monarchs ===
- 1969 Danny Kaye
- 1970 Raymond Burr
- 1971 Jim Nabors
- 1972 Phil Harris
- 1973 Bob Hope
- 1974 Glen Campbell
- 1975 Jackie Gleason
- 1976 Perry Como
- 1977 Henry Winkler
- 1978 Ed McMahon
- 1979 Ron Howard
- 1980 Pete Fountain
- 1981 Sgt. John McKeel, Jr. (of the Iran hostage crisis)
- 1982 Dom DeLuise
- 1983 Charlton Heston
- 1984 Kirk Douglas
- 1985 Lorne Greene
- 1986 John Ritter
- 1987 William Shatner
- 1988 Alan Thicke
- 1989 Billy Crystal
- 1990 Dennis Quaid
- 1991 Steve Guttenberg
- 1992 Gerald McRaney
- 1993 Harry Connick, Jr.
- 1994 Jean Claude Van-Damme
- 1995 John Larroquette
- 1996 Dick Clark
- 1997 Tom Arnold
- 1998 Drew Carey
- 1999 Jim Belushi
- 2000 Luke Perry
- 2001 Larry King
- 2002 Nicolas Cage
- 2003 Jon Lovitz
- 2004 Elijah Wood
- 2005 Sean Astin
- 2006 Michael Keaton
- 2007 James Gandolfini
- 2008 Hulk Hogan
- 2009 Val Kilmer
- 2010 Drew Brees
- 2011 Andy Garcia
- 2012 Will Ferrell
- 2013 G. W. Bailey
- 2014 Hugh Laurie
- 2015 John C. Reilly
- 2016 Anthony Mackie
- 2017 Jim Caviezel
- 2018 J. K. Simmons
- 2019 Jensen Ackles
- 2020 Robin Thicke
- 2021 The parade was canceled in 2021 due to the COVID-19 pandemic
- 2022 Josh Duhamel
- 2023 Adam Devine
- 2024 Kevin Dillon
- 2025 Shaquille O'Neal
- 2026 Patrick Warburton
