= Meadow Creek Elementary =

Meadow Creek Elementary can refer to the following schools:

- Meadow Creek Elementary, a former school of the Yucaipa-Calimesa Joint Unified School District in Yucaipa, California
- Meadow Creek Elementary, a school of the Hurst-Euless-Bedford Independent School District in Bedford, Texas
- Meadowcreek Elementary, a school of the Gwinnett County Public Schools in Norcross, Georgia
- Meadowcreek Elementary, a school of Crowley Independent School District in Fort Worth, Texas
