= Super Bowl LIX =

2025 National Football League championship game

Kansas City Chiefs (1) (AFC) (15–2)	Philadelphia Eagles (2) (NFC) (14–3)
22	40
Head coach: Andy Reid	Head coach: Nick Sirianni
	1	2	3	4	Total
KC	0	0	6	16	22
PHI	7	17	10	6	40
- Date: February 9, 2025
- Kickoff time: 5:30 p.m. CT
- Stadium: Caesars Superdome; New Orleans, Louisiana
- MVP: Jalen Hurts, quarterback
- Favorite: Chiefs by 1.5
- Referee: Ron Torbert
- Attendance: 65,719

Ceremonies
- National anthem: Jon Batiste
- Coin toss: Brett and Jack Bech and Cathy and Louis Tenedorio on behalf of the families of the 2025 New Orleans truck attack victims
- Halftime show: Kendrick Lamar, featuring SZA and Samuel L. Jackson

TV in the United States
- Network: TV: Fox; Telemundo (Spanish); Fox Deportes (Spanish); Streaming: Tubi; NFL+
- Announcers: Kevin Burkhardt (play-by-play); Tom Brady (analyst); Erin Andrews and Tom Rinaldi (sideline reporters); Mike Pereira (rules analyst)
- Nielsen ratings: 41.7 (national); U.S. TV viewership: 127.7 million
- Cost of 30-second commercial: $7–8 million

Radio in the United States
- Network: Westwood One
- Announcers: Kevin Harlan (play-by-play); Kurt Warner (analyst); Laura Okmin (sideline reporter); Gene Steratore (rules analyst)

Super Bowl LIX was an American football championship game played between the American Football Conference (AFC) champion and two-time defending Super Bowl champion Kansas City Chiefs and the National Football Conference (NFC) champion Philadelphia Eagles. This game would determine the champion of the National Football League (NFL) for the 2024 season. In a rematch of Super Bowl LVII which was played two years prior, the Eagles defeated the Chiefs 40–22. The game was played on February 9, 2025, at Caesars Superdome in New Orleans, Louisiana. It was the eleventh Super Bowl played in New Orleans, and the eighth in the Superdome. Eagles quarterback Jalen Hurts was named Super Bowl MVP after scoring three total touchdowns (two passing, one rushing) and setting the Super Bowl record for rushing yards by a quarterback with 72.

The Chiefs finished the regular season with a 15–2 record (tied for league best). Kansas City's seventh Super Bowl appearance, the franchise entered the game in a bid to achieve the first Super Bowl three-peat, having won Super Bowl LVIII in 2024 and Super Bowl LVII in 2023. The Eagles posted a 14–3 record with the aid of an improved offense and the league's top-ranked defense, making their fifth Super Bowl appearance.

Although Super Bowl LIX was expected to be a close contest, with Kansas City being the favorite to win, the Eagles dominated throughout the game. The Chiefs did not score until the waning moments of the third quarter, gaining only 23 yards in the first half, the second-lowest first-half yardage in Super Bowl history. Kansas City quarterback Patrick Mahomes struggled throughout, being sacked a career-high six times, all while the Eagles' defense did not employ any blitzes. He committed three turnovers, including a 38-yard pick-six by Cooper DeJean, who became the second rookie in Super Bowl history to achieve such a feat. Philadelphia took advantage of their powerful defensive performance and Kansas City's offensive struggles to build an insurmountable 34-point lead by the third quarter. The Eagles held a 40–6 lead in the final five minutes before the Chiefs had two late scores, occurring after head coach Nick Sirianni pulled many of the Eagles’ starters from the game to prevent injury.

This was the Eagles' second Super Bowl victory, following their first in Super Bowl LII seven years earlier, and their fifth NFL championship. The Chiefs suffered their third Super Bowl loss in franchise history, following losses in Super Bowl I and Super Bowl LV.

The game was televised in the United States by Fox and streamed on Tubi. Super Bowl LIX became the most watched broadcast in American television history, with an average of 127.7 million viewers in the United States, breaking a record set by the previous year's Super Bowl. An average of 14.5 million viewers came from streaming platforms. The halftime show, headlined by Kendrick Lamar, became the most watched of its kind with a television audience of more than 133.5 million viewers, breaking a record set by that of Super Bowl XXVII featuring Michael Jackson. It was also the first Super Bowl to be attended in-person by a sitting U.S. president (Donald Trump).

Super Bowl LIX is considered to be one of the worst Super Bowls by several sports outlets, who noted its one-sidedness throughout. However, the Eagles' defensive performance was widely praised as one of the best in the game's history.

== Background ==
=== Host selection ===
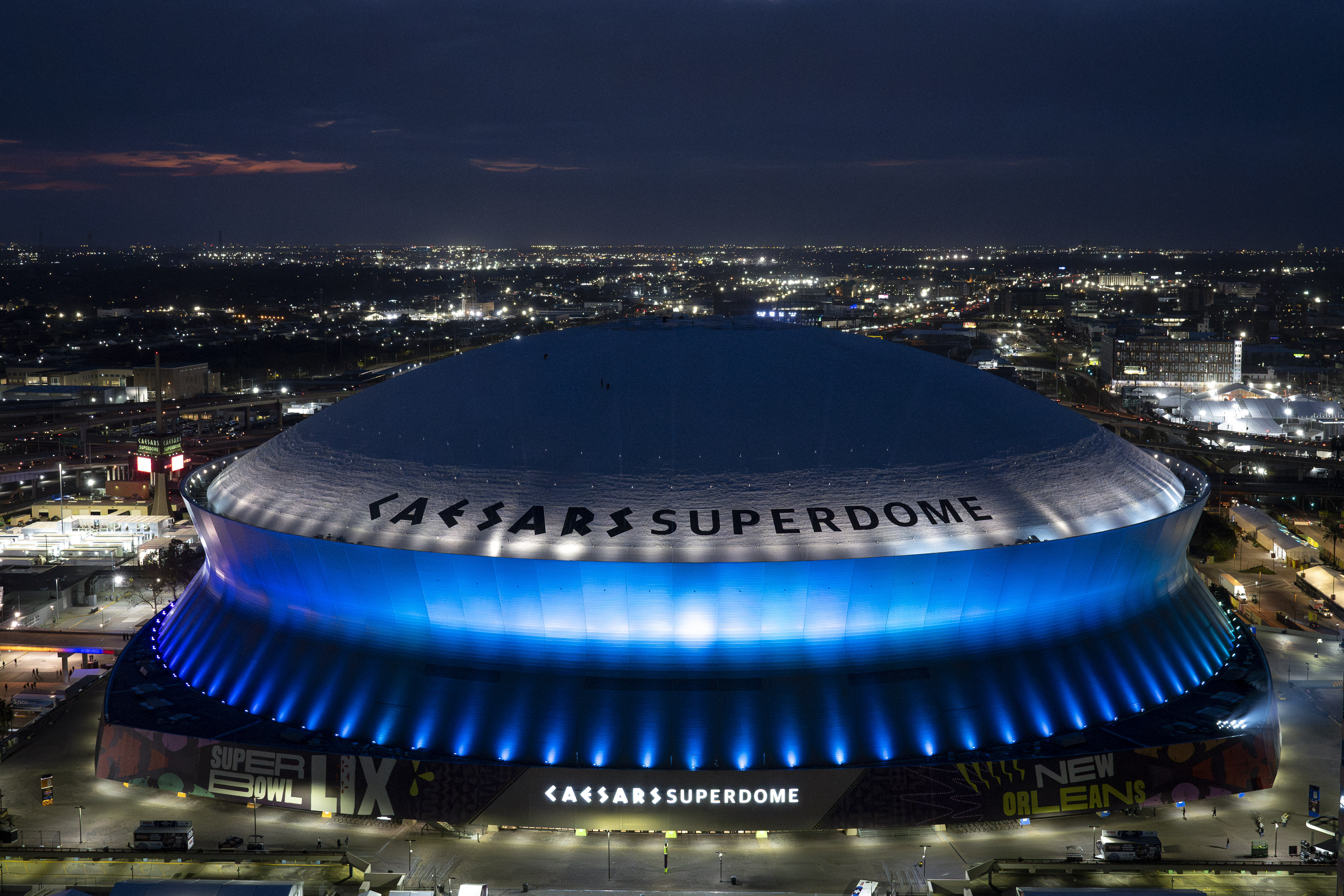
Caesars Superdome in New Orleans, the venue for Super Bowl LIX

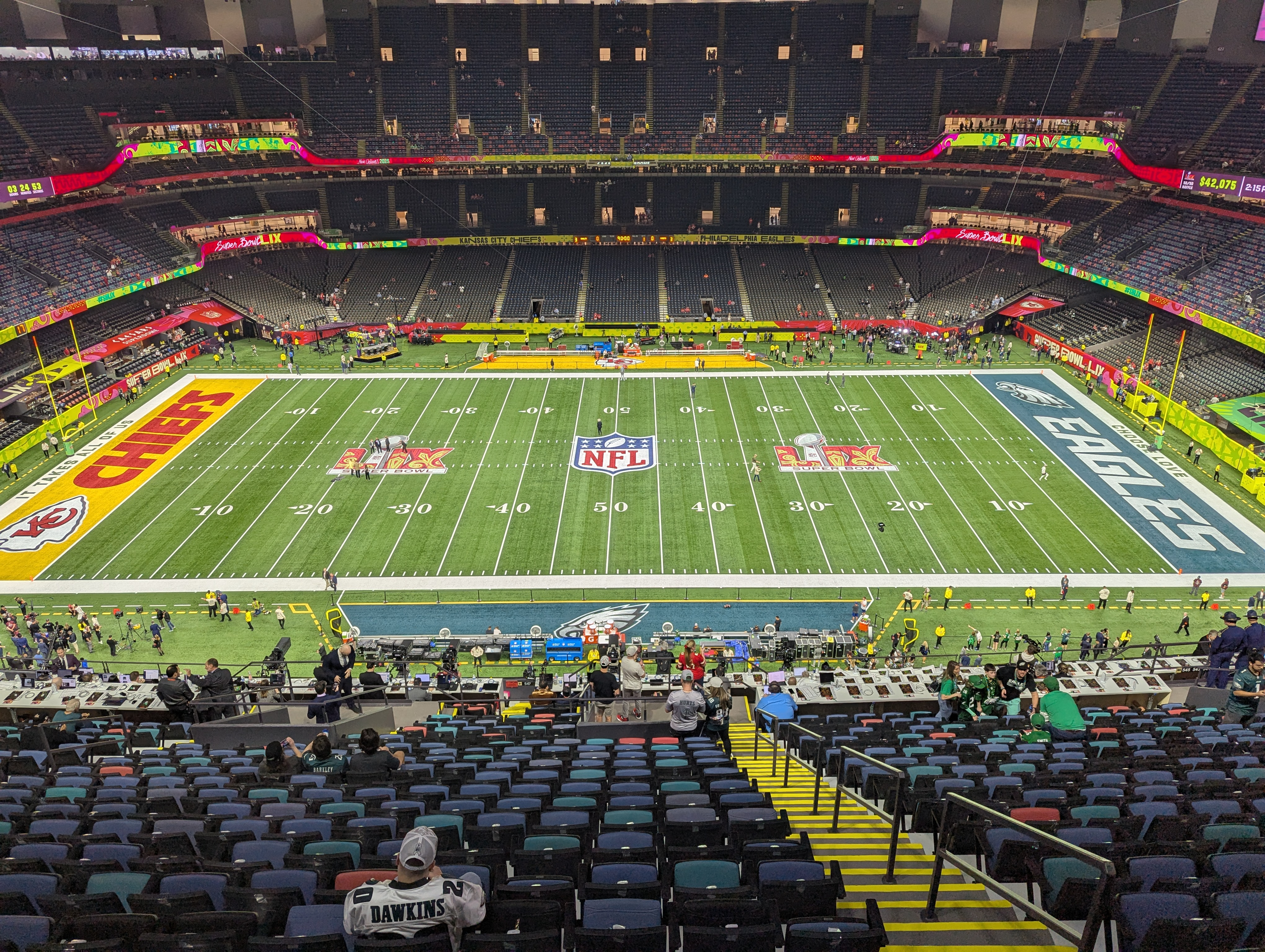
The field setup at Caesars Superdome prior to Super Bowl LIX

On May 23, 2018, the league originally selected New Orleans as the site for Super Bowl LVIII, then tentatively scheduled for February 4, 2024. In March 2020, the league and the NFLPA agreed to expand the regular season from 16 to 17 games starting in 2021, pushing Super Bowl LVIII to February 11, 2024, and causing a conflict with New Orleans' Mardi Gras celebrations. On October 14, 2020, the league decided to move Super Bowl LVIII to another city (Las Vegas was later chosen) and awarded Super Bowl LIX to New Orleans instead, as Mardi Gras in 2025 was not until March 4, thus avoiding any conflicts.

=== Logo ===
The official logo for Super Bowl LIX was unveiled on February 12, 2024, and follows the logo template established since Super Bowl LVI, with the Roman numerals featuring imagery representing the host city/region. The Roman numerals contain artwork by local artist "Queen" Tahj Williams—a figure in the community of Mardi Gras Indians. It marks the first time the NFL has collaborated with a local artist on the design of a Super Bowl emblem.

The design was created with beads, and features Mardi Gras–inspired red-, green-, and gold-colored fleur-de-lis patterns, a symbol long connected with New Orleans and used as the logo for the New Orleans Saints, evoking designs of ironwork balconies typical in the city's architecture, especially in the French Quarter.

=== Security ===
Super Bowl organizers said they would review security procedures in the wake of the truck attack incident on Bourbon Street on January 1, 2025, in which 15 people were killed and dozens were injured, delaying the 2025 Sugar Bowl at the Superdome to the following day. Tourism official Walt Leger III said on New Year's Day that the priority would be on the immediate response to the attack but "[t]here will be more deep conversations in the coming days and weeks to discuss possible enhancements for the Super Bowl." Meanwhile, the NFL released a statement assuring that the game would be a "safe and enjoyable" experience.

Leger emphasized that while recovery remained the immediate focus, discussions had been underway regarding increased security measures for the Super Bowl. In response to the attack, the city of New Orleans significantly ramped up security, including a larger law enforcement presence and stricter movement restrictions in the city. Vehicle traffic was prohibited on Bourbon Street, and "safe corridors" were established for key individuals. Over 2,000 officers, including federal agents, special forces, and bomb-sniffing dogs, were deployed to safeguard the area.

The city's security plan for the Super Bowl was expected to be the most advanced in years, shaped by lessons from the January attack. Measures included federal air marshals, rooftop snipers, and anti-drone technology. Additionally, security teams conducted thorough sweeps of the Superdome to ensure the venue remained free of potential threats. Meanwhile, the NFL released a statement assuring that the game would be a "safe and enjoyable" experience.

=== Slogan ===
On February 3, 2025, league officials announced that the "End Racism" slogan, which debuted at the end zone of Super Bowl LV, would be reworded to "Choose Love" during the game. Although at least one high-ranking NFL official had expressed concern in light of U.S. President Donald Trump's remarks on racism, NFL spokesperson Brian McCarthy said that he made the choice in light of such recent events as the New Orleans truck attack, the January 2025 Southern California wildfires, and the Potomac River mid-air collision. The slogan "It Takes All of Us" remained in the end zone. Goodell had earlier reaffirmed his league's commitment to diversity, equity, and inclusion efforts despite efforts at such having been scaled back by a number of other American corporations since 2024.

=== Super Bowl week events ===
Super Bowl Opening Night was held at the Superdome on February 3, while the Super Bowl Experience was hosted by the New Orleans Morial Convention Center. A two-day cultural festival was hosted in the French Market.

The Super Bowl LIX Host Committee hosted a parade through the French Quarter on February 8. The parade featured appearances by the LSU, Tulane, and Marine Corps marching bands, themed floats representing the participating teams (featuring mascots, cheerleaders, and family members of players), and contributions from various krewes and organizations associated with Mardi Gras in New Orleans—including the Baby Doll Ladies, Mardi Gras Indians, Endymion, Orpheus, and Bacchus (whose float carried grand marshal Todd Graves). Unlike the official Mardi Gras parades, this parade would be underwritten by various sponsors (including sponsorship of specific floats and contingents, and a hitch of Budweiser Clydesdales participating in the parade themselves); city ordinances prohibit parades held during the official Mardi Gras period (which began February 21) from having corporate sponsorships.

=== Boycott efforts ===
Calls were made for a boycott of the game, making claims of officiating misconduct in the Chiefs' favor during the 2024 season, particularly the AFC Championship Game. Prices for tickets to the game on the secondary market collapsed following the AFC Championship Game, falling roughly 30% compared to resale tickets for Super Bowl LVIII; Brett Goldberg, co-owner of TickPick, suggested New Orleans's relatively low hotel capacity was a factor in the sharp decline, but that Chiefs fatigue was also a factor: "I think if the Bills won, you would've seen a very different dynamic here." In Buffalo, Bills Mafia co-founder Del Reid lent his support to "not-watch parties" to give disgruntled Bills fans an opportunity to socialize out of the house without being subjected to the game.

Both commissioner Roger Goodell and Referees Association executive director Scott Green have denied accusations of wrongdoing, with Goodell suggesting that the notion of games being rigged or fixed in the Chiefs' favor is "a ridiculous theory" not to be taken seriously. The boycott, despite not having a visible impact on overall national viewership, resulted in a marked decline in viewership in Buffalo, where the 237,000 viewers for the game was the lowest since people meters were introduced and a 25% drop from the 315,000 who watched the previous year's Super Bowl.

== Teams ==
=== Kansas City Chiefs ===
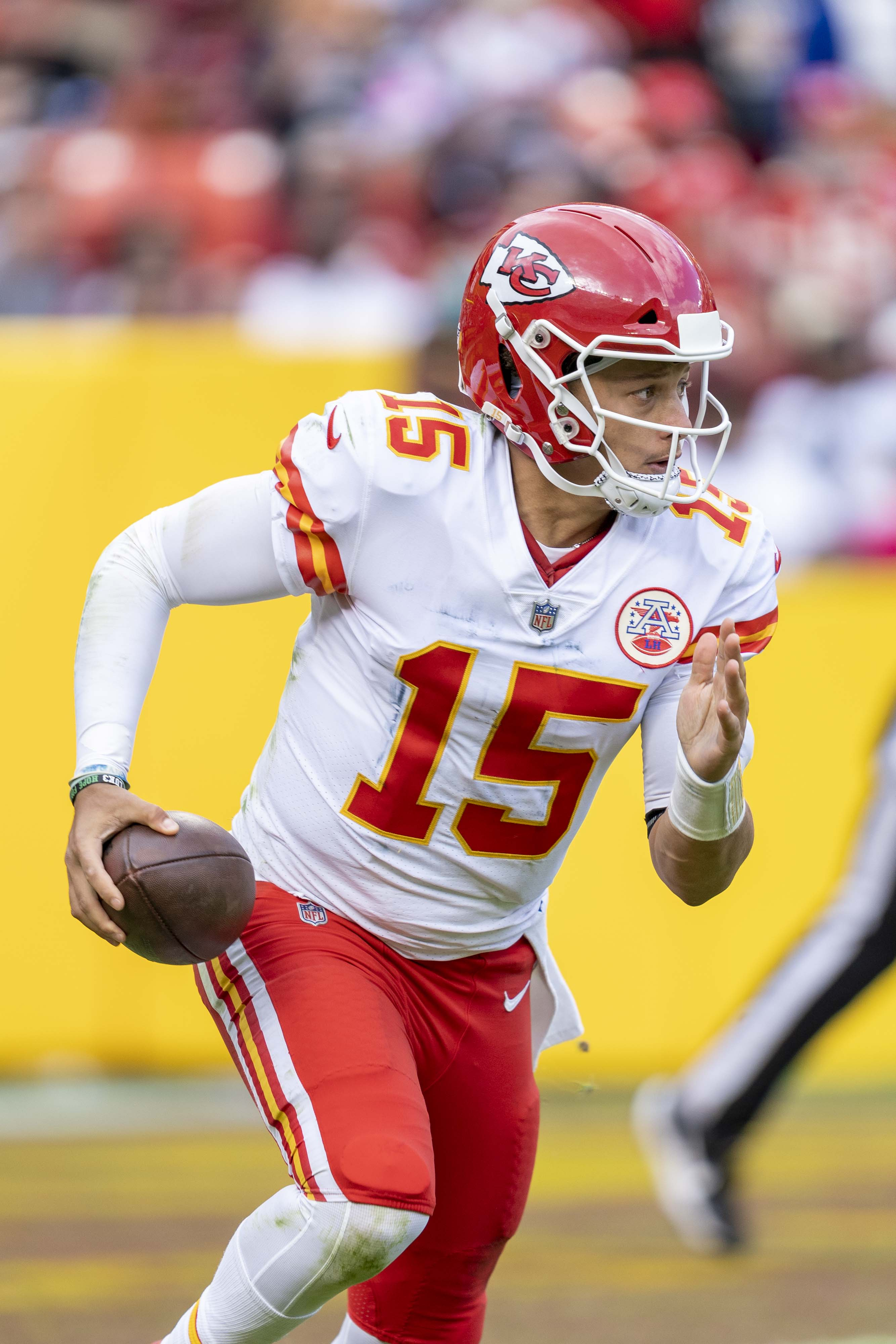
Patrick Mahomes and the Kansas City Chiefs were attempting to win their third consecutive Super Bowl, which would have represented an unprecedented three-peat of Super Bowl victories.

The Kansas City Chiefs entered Super Bowl LIX attempting to become the first NFL team to win three Super Bowls in a row. Under head coach Andy Reid, the Chiefs finished the regular season 15–2, tied with the Detroit Lions for best regular-season record in the NFL.

The team's quarterback, Patrick Mahomes, had lower stats than in previous seasons, missing the 4,000-yard passing mark and the Pro Bowl for the first time as a starter. However, he had seven game-winning drives, tied for second-most of all time. Tight end Travis Kelce led the team in receiving yards (823), while running back Kareem Hunt led the team in rushing yards (728). Wide receiver Xavier Worthy had a productive rookie season with 742 yards and nine touchdowns. The Chiefs acquired wide receiver DeAndre Hopkins in a mid-season trade with the Tennessee Titans; Hopkins had 437 receiving yards and four receiving touchdowns in five starts. The offensive line included Pro Bowlers Joe Thuney, Creed Humphrey, and Trey Smith, with Thuney and Humphrey also being selected to the AP All-Pro team.

The Chiefs' defense was headlined by All-Pros defensive tackle Chris Jones (5.0 sacks) and cornerback Trent McDuffie (two interceptions). Other notable players include George Karlaftis (8.0 sacks), Nick Bolton (106 tackles), and Justin Reid (87 tackles). They were a top-four defense for the second straight year under defensive coordinator Steve Spagnuolo.

Super Bowl LIX marked the seventh Super Bowl appearance for the Chiefs, who won Super Bowls IV, LIV, LVII, and LVIII, while losing Super Bowls I and LV. They played in the Super Bowl four times in the past five seasons, winning three of them. Kansas City became the first team to win two consecutive Super Bowls and play in a Super Bowl the following season; the previous eight teams to win two consecutive Super Bowls failed to appear in the game for a third consecutive season. They attempted the first "three-peat" of three consecutive Super Bowl wins (with the league securing a trademark license from Pat Riley to allow the use of the word commercially), the first time the same team would have won the NFL Championship three times in a row since the Green Bay Packers achieved the feat from 1965 to 1967, which included their wins of the first two Super Bowls. The last team in the four North American major professional sports leagues to successfully achieve a three-peat was the Los Angeles Lakers in the National Basketball Association (NBA) from 2000 to 2002.

=== Philadelphia Eagles ===
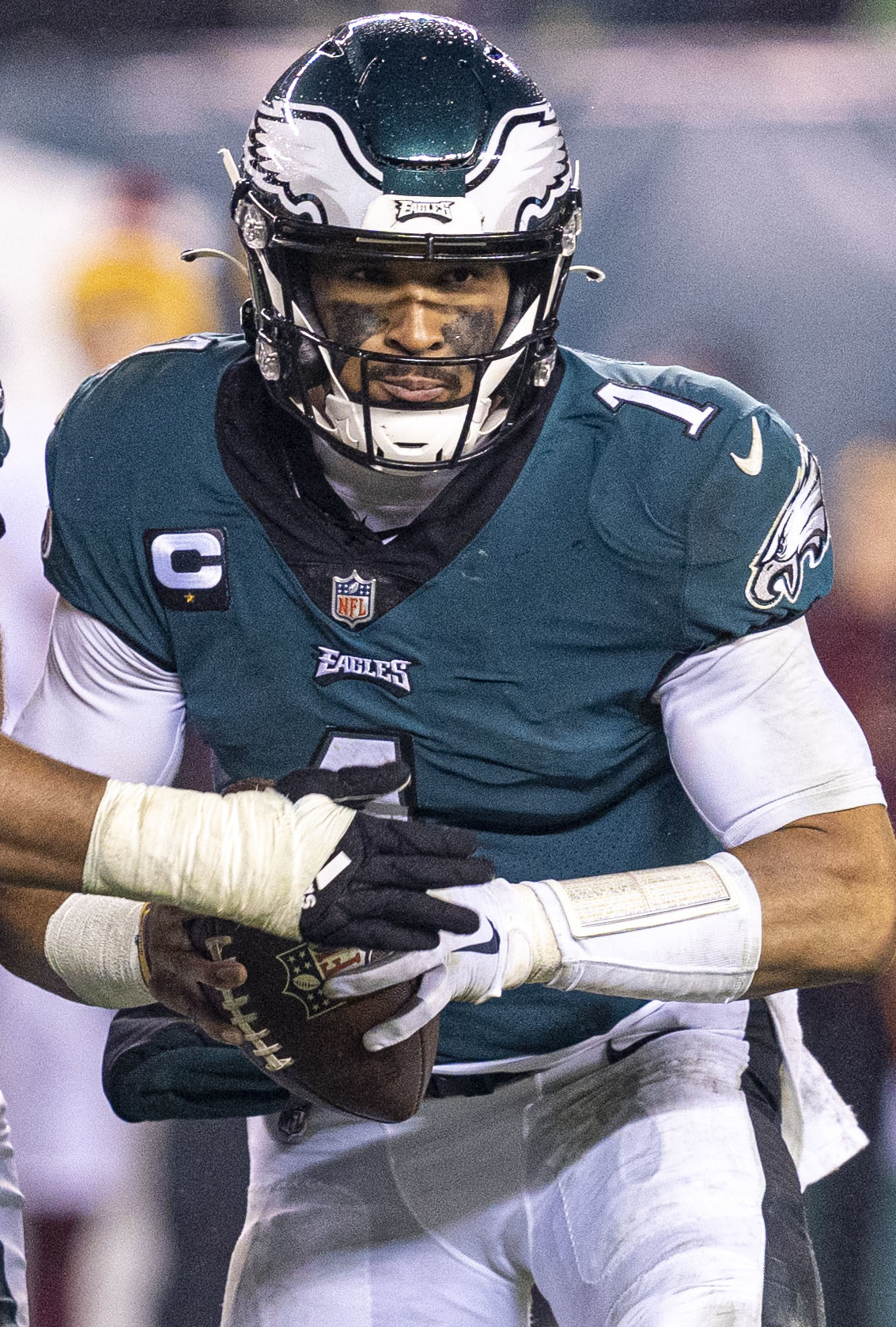
Jalen Hurts, quarterback of the Philadelphia Eagles, led the Eagles to the Super Bowl for the second time in his career, after playing in Super Bowl LVII during the 2022 NFL season.

Under head coach Nick Sirianni, the Philadelphia Eagles improved upon their 11–6 record in 2023, going 14–3. This was Philadelphia's fifth Super Bowl appearance, following a win in Super Bowl LII and losses in Super Bowls XV, XXXIX, and LVII.

Quarterback Jalen Hurts had an efficient season, with career highs in completion percentage, yards per attempt, passer rating, and only five interceptions. However, he only attempted 361 passes due to the high workload from Offensive Player of the Year and first-team All-Pro running back Saquon Barkley, who became the ninth player in league history with 2,000 rushing yards in a season. Hurts also missed the final three games in the regular season due to a concussion and broken finger, but he returned for the playoffs. The Eagles receiving corps included second-team All-Pro wide receiver A. J. Brown (1,079 yards), wide receiver DeVonta Smith (833 yards), and tight end Dallas Goedert (496 yards). The offensive line was one of the best in the league, with Cam Jurgens, Landon Dickerson, and Lane Johnson making the Pro Bowl, as well as Johnson and Jordan Mailata being selected as All-Pros.

Under defensive coordinator Vic Fangio, the Eagles had the top-ranked defense in the NFL, headlined by linebacker Zack Baun (151 tackles, five forced fumbles, 3.5 sacks). The defensive front consisted of All-Pro defensive tackle Jalen Carter (4.5 sacks) and Milton Williams (5.0 sacks), and outside linebackers Josh Sweat (8.0 sacks) and Nolan Smith (6.5 sacks). The secondary had multiple key contributors, including rookie cornerbacks Quinyon Mitchell and Cooper DeJean, safeties Reed Blankenship and C. J. Gardner-Johnson, and veteran cornerback Darius Slay.

=== Playoffs ===
The Chiefs entered the playoffs as the No. 1 seed in the AFC and earned a first-round bye. In the Divisional Round, they defeated the Houston Texans, 23–14. In the AFC Championship Game, the Chiefs beat the Buffalo Bills, 32–29, making it the fourth time in five seasons that the Chiefs defeated the Bills in the playoffs. The victory was with some controversy, particularly with a disputed spotting of the ball that ended a Bills drive with a turnover on downs, giving the Chiefs the opportunity for the go-ahead score.

The Eagles went into the playoffs as the No. 2 seed in the NFC. In the Wild Card Round, they defeated the Green Bay Packers, 22–10. In the Divisional Round, the Eagles defeated the Los Angeles Rams, 28–22. The Eagles went on to defeat the Washington Commanders in the NFC Championship Game, 55–23, setting a record for the most points scored in a conference championship game.

=== Pre-game notes ===
The game was a rematch of Super Bowl LVII, which was played two years earlier, in which the Chiefs defeated the Eagles, 38–35. Patrick Mahomes vs. Jalen Hurts was the fourth rematch between two starting quarterbacks in Super Bowl history, joining Eli Manning–Tom Brady, Troy Aikman–Jim Kelly, and Terry Bradshaw–Roger Staubach. In each of the previous three instances, the same quarterback won both games.

This was the eleventh Super Bowl in New Orleans and the first since Super Bowl XLVII in 2013. It was also the second Super Bowl in New Orleans for both the Chiefs and the Eagles. The Chiefs defeated the Minnesota Vikings in Super Bowl IV at Tulane Stadium, which was also the first Super Bowl played in New Orleans. The Eagles lost in their previous Super Bowl appearance in New Orleans, falling to the Oakland Raiders in Super Bowl XV at the then-named Louisiana Superdome.

As the designated home team in the Super Bowl's annual rotation between the two conferences, the Eagles chose to wear their midnight green home jerseys with white pants. The Chiefs wore their white away jerseys with red pants. Both teams matched the uniforms they wore in Super Bowl LVII.

As the designated home team, the Eagles practiced at the host New Orleans Saints' practice facility in Metairie, Louisiana, the week leading up to the game, while the Chiefs held their practices at Tulane University in New Orleans.

Like Super Bowl LVII, this game was dubbed the "Andy Reid Bowl". Reid is the winningest head coach in both Philadelphia and Kansas City's team history. As the Eagles’ head coach from 1999 to 2012, Reid compiled a 130–93–1 (.583) record, and won one NFC Championship. As the Chiefs’ head coach since 2013, Reid had a 143–53 (.730) record, five AFC Championships, and three Super Bowl victories.

As in Super Bowl LVIII, this game was dubbed by some as the "Swiftie Bowl" (or "Swiftie Bowl II") due to the high-profile relationship between Chiefs tight end Travis Kelce and pop star Taylor Swift, and Swift's frequent presence at Chiefs games. A survey conducted by LendingTree in early January determined that Swift's association with the league had a polarizing effect on its fan base; it noted 14% of respondents had increased interest in the league because of Swift but that 10% had lost interest because of her and 17% now hated her influence on the NFL.

Like previous Super Bowls involving the Chiefs, Kansas City Indian Center and Not in Our Honor Coalition called for the team to change its name and stop the use of the tomahawk chop. The team is not directly named for Native Americans; "Chief" was the nickname of Kansas City mayor Harold Roe Bartle when the team moved to Kansas City. Bartle was not a Native American; his nickname came from his history of dressing up as Native Americans while leading a Boy Scout camp.

During the team introductions, actor Jon Hamm introduced the Chiefs and actor Bradley Cooper introduced the Eagles.

A moment of silence for football executive Virginia Halas McCaskey who died three days earlier was held before "America the Beautiful" and the national anthem.

== Broadcasting ==
=== United States ===
==== Television ====
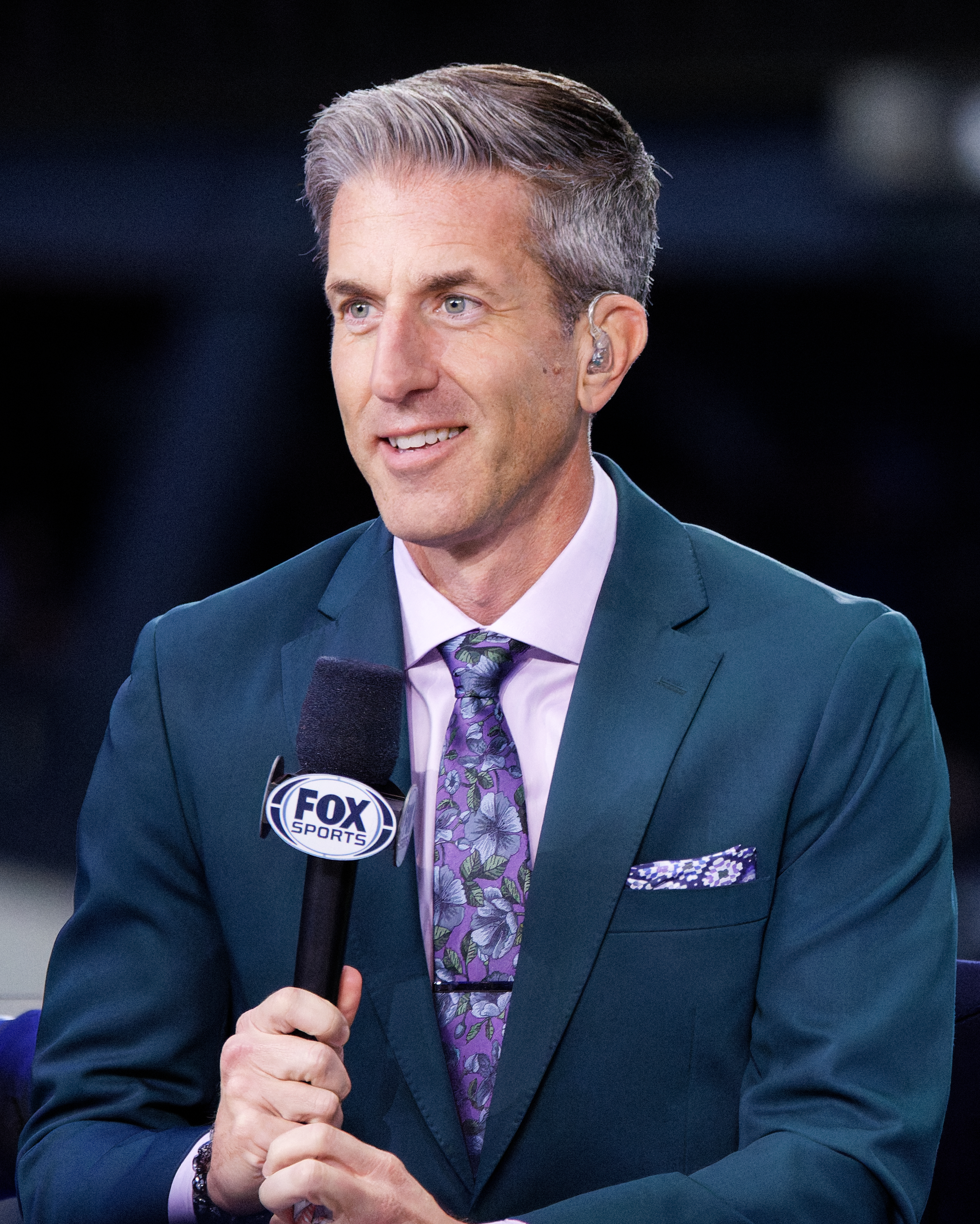
Kevin Burkhardt

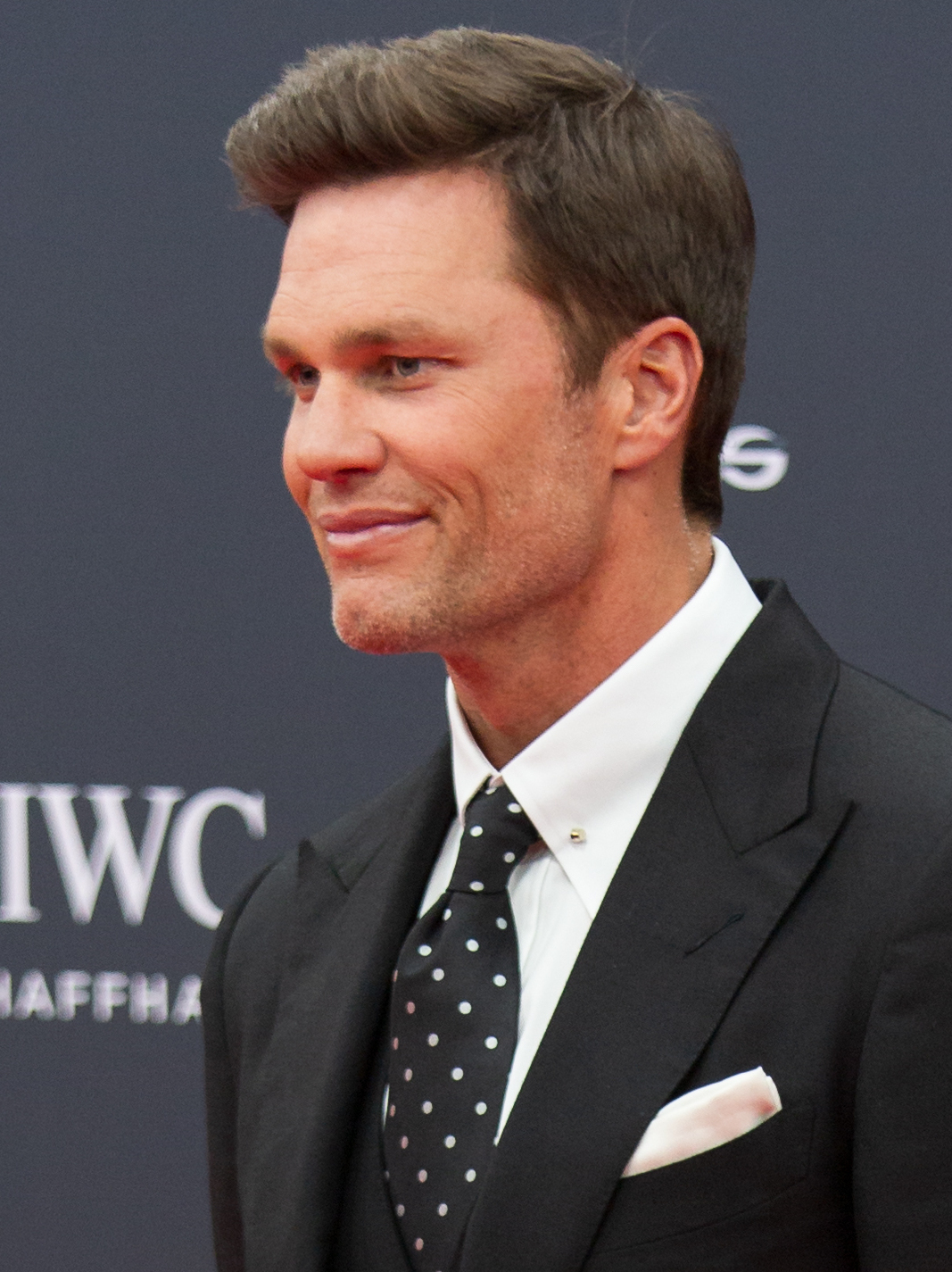
Tom Brady

Super Bowl LIX was televised in English by Fox, with game commentary called by play-by-play announcer Kevin Burkhardt, color analyst Tom Brady, sideline reporters Erin Andrews and Tom Rinaldi, and rules analyst Mike Pereira. Studio coverage was provided by the network's Fox NFL Sunday crew, with Curt Menefee hosting, Terry Bradshaw, Rob Gronkowski, Howie Long, Michael Strahan, and Jimmy Johnson providing analysis, and Jay Glazer contributing insider reports. It was the second Super Bowl to be broadcast under the 11-year NFL television contract as part of the four-year rotation between CBS, Fox, NBC, and ABC/ESPN. On October 14, 2024, it was announced that both Fox Deportes and Telemundo would air separate Spanish-language feeds of the game for the first time.

Fox used over 140 cameras, including a new 4K, 240 Hz model from Sony as its high skycam. The lower skycam employed the use of lidar and simultaneous localization and mapping (SLAM) technology to provide more precise tracking of its position, data which would primarily be used to improve the performance of augmented reality (AR) graphics. Fox produced the game in 1080p high definition with HLG high-dynamic-range color, upconverted to a 4K ultra-high-definition feed available through participating television and streaming providers. Comcast announced that it would carry the game in Dolby Vision and Dolby Atmos surround sound on Xfinity. On broadcast television, Gray Media announced it would carry the game in Dolby Vision and HDR10+ on its Fox affiliates that offer ATSC 3.0 signals, including New Orleans' WVUE-DT.

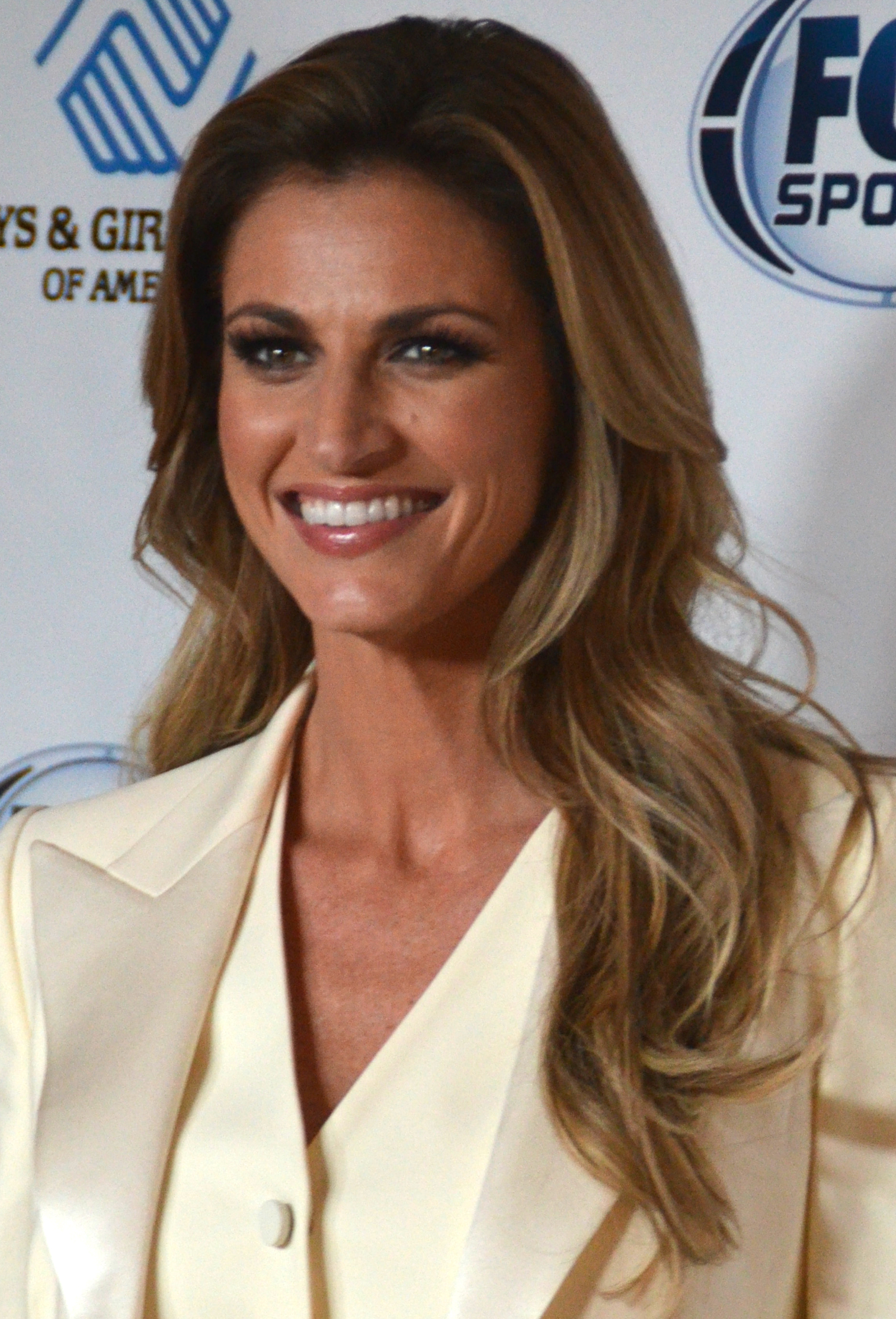
Erin Andrews

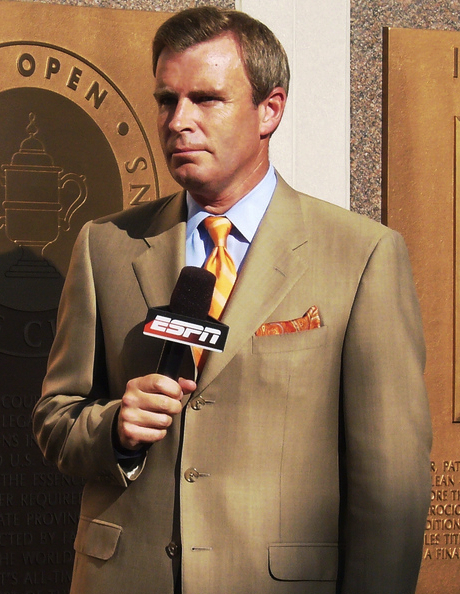
Tom Rinaldi

The season 3 premiere of Fox's game show The Floor aired after the game. Beginning in January 2025, the Fox series Kitchen Nightmares aired a series of "Road to Super Bowl LIX" episodes during the first half of its ninth season, which primarily featured restaurants in the New Orleans area, and featured guest appearances by NFL players and personalities. As part of its Super Bowl week programming, Fox scheduled special broadcast television airings of the Fox Sports 1 lineup of weekday studio programming (including The Herd with Colin Cowherd among others) from New Orleans on February 7.

Fox Corporation announced, based on preliminary Nielsen data and internal Tubi measurements, the game was watched by an average of 126 million people across all channels and streaming services, which would make it the most-watched Super Bowl in history. Viewership peaked at around 135.7 million during the second quarter. This increase was largely due to changes in the audience measurement methodologies that added out-of-home viewing in smaller media markets that had not been counted in previous years, as well as a major spike in online viewing, as Fox reported that 13.6 million of those viewers came from the Tubi broadcast and 900,000 viewers from NFL+. Direct streaming comparisons are not possible because Paramount+, which had streamed the previous year's Super Bowl, did not make its data public. Nielsen revised that number upward to 127.7 million the next day, adding in 1.87 million viewers who watched the Spanish language simulcasts. Samba TV measurements calculated a 5% decline compared to the previous year.

==== Advertising ====
In August 2024, before the beginning of the 2024 NFL regular season, Fox announced that it had sold most of its advertising slots for Super Bowl LIX. The 30-second ad slots were priced at $7 million each. This sale included the main event inventory and additional slots typically reserved by the network. Citing unexpected commitments emerging from the 2025 California wildfires, several advertisers withdrew from the game, such as State Farm; this allowed Fox to resell these ad slots at a higher rate. According to reports, several of the newly available slots were sold for $8 million each. Interest in advertising extended to Fox's pre-game show; traditionally, ads during the pre-game show sold for around $2 million for 30-second slots. For Super Bowl LIX, prices rose to $4.5 million for these slots, reflecting increased demand.

The Super Bowl Ad Meter survey conducted by USA Today was won by Budweiser for its commercial "First Delivery", its first win on the survey since 2015. Nike notably aired a commercial during the game for the first time since 1988, with an ad focusing upon and celebrating women's sports. Doritos revived its "Crash the Super Bowl" promotion, while debuting advertisers during the game included Bosch, Duracell, HexClad (the first cookware company to air an ad during the game), Instacart, Liquid Death, NerdWallet, OpenAI, Ritz, and Totino's. Cetaphil aired an ad exclusive to the New Orleans market starring rapper and New Orleans native Lil Wayne; playing upon not having been chosen to play the game's halftime show, it notably teased the release date for his upcoming album Tha Carter VI.

Kanye West bought local ad time on four Fox stations in which he promoted the website for his Yeezy brand from a dentist's chair. After the ad aired, the only item available for purchase on the website's shop was a white T-shirt with a large swastika. Kanye's website was taken down by Shopify a couple hours later. Jack Abernethy, the CEO of Fox Television Stations, said that "The ad, which was presented as a legitimate online apparel site before and during the airing of the Super Bowl, was switched at some point afterwards", and condemned the website's content.

==== Streaming ====
On January 15, 2025, Fox announced that its telecast of Super Bowl LIX would stream in English and Spanish on Tubi, Fox Corporation's free ad-supported streaming television (FAST) platform, for the first time, thereby returning the game to free Internet television without a paywall or TV Everywhere requirement; most of the networks except Fox have paywalled the stream since Super Bowl LVI. Tubi streamed a digital-exclusive pre-game show hosted by Olivia Culpo—Tubi Red Carpet at Super Bowl LIX—which focused on pop culture topics relating to the game (such as celebrity attendees, and festivities around New Orleans). Emulating the traditional linear television lead-out, the Tubi app then directed viewers to the first episode of its original sitcom The Z-Suite, which premiered earlier in the week, following the conclusion of the telecast.

==== Radio ====
Westwood One held the national radio rights to the game in English, with play-by-play announcer Kevin Harlan, color analyst Kurt Warner, sideline reporter Laura Okmin, and rules analyst Gene Steratore on the call. Scott Graham hosted studio coverage along with analysts Devin McCourty and Ross Tucker. Entravision carried the game nationally in Spanish, with Ricardo Celis and Tony Nuñez announcing.

In the home markets of the two teams, the game was broadcast on their flagship radio stations with their local announcers. 96.5 The Fan aired the Chiefs' call of the game with Mitch Holthus, Danan Hughes, and Josh Klinger, while 94 WIP carried the Eagles' call with Merrill Reese and Mike Quick.

=== International ===
Super Bowl LIX was broadcast in more than 150 countries on every continent except Antarctica, including:

==== Americas ====
- In Canada, the game's broadcast rights were owned by Bell Media. The game was televised in English on Fox (within American–Canadian borders for some markets), TSN and CTV, subject to simultaneous substitution; RDS carried the French broadcast of the game. Additionally, the game was streamed on TSN+ and DAZN.
- In Latin and South America, the game was televised by ESPN and its streaming and on-demand platform Disney+ in Spanish. English language commentary was available on ESPN 3 across Latin America.
- In the Caribbean, the game was broadcast on ESPN.
- In Mexico, the game was televised by ESPN and Azteca 7 both in Spanish. Dedicated English language commentary was available on ESPN 3.
- In Brazil, the game was televised by ESPN and RedeTV! and its streaming and on-demand platforms Disney+ in Portuguese (with English SAP) and NFL Game Pass on DAZN in English.
- In Argentina, the game was televised by ESPN.

==== Europe ====
- In the United Kingdom and Ireland, the game was televised on premium channels Sky Sports NFL, Sky Sports Main Event, Sky Sports Mix, Sky Showcase, and Sky's on-demand and streaming service Now.
  - Additionally in the United Kingdom, the game was televised on the free-to-air channels ITV1, STV and UTV, (Note: ITV1 is broadcast in England, Wales and ITV Border region in Scotland. STV is broadcast in the rest of Scotland, and UTV is broadcast in Northern Ireland) and streaming services ITVX and STV Player. It was carried on radio via Talksport, BBC Sport Online, BBC Radio 5 Live, and BBC Sounds.
  - Additionally, in Ireland, the game was televised on channel Virgin Media Two and on streaming service Virgin Media Play, both showing a simulcast of ITV1 at the time. It was carried on radio via RTÉ Radio 1.
- In Portugal and Belgium, the game was streamed by DAZN.
- In Germany, Austria, Switzerland, Luxembourg, and Liechtenstein, the game was televised by RTL Group (RTL, Nitro).
- In France, Andorra, Monaco, and some French Overseas Territories, the game was televised on M6 and beIN Sports.
- In Spain, the game was televised by Movistar Plus+ and Deportes por M+ and also streamed by DAZN.
- In Italy, the game was televised by Mediaset's channel Italia 1 and its streaming and on-demand platform DAZN with NFL Game Pass International.
- In Denmark, the game was televised by TV 2.
- In Norway, the game was televised by VGTV.
- In Sweden and Finland, the game was televised by a channel within the TV4-sphere and its streaming service TV4 Play (previously known as C More).
- In Iceland, the game was televised by Stöð 2 Sport.
- In Poland, the game was televised by free-to-air station Polsat, its second Super Bowl broadcast. The game aired on Polsat's sister sports station, Polsat Sport, and streamed on Polsat Box Go and DAZN (only for NFL Game Pass subscribers).
- In Czechia, the game was televised by Premier Sport 2.
- In Slovakia, the game was televised by Nova Sport.
- In Bosnia and Herzegovina, Croatia, Kosovo, Montenegro, North Macedonia, Serbia, and Slovenia, the game was televised by Arena Sport.
- In Bulgaria, the game was televised by Max Sport 2.
- In Greece, the game was televised by Cosmote Sport 3HD.
- In Cyprus, the game was televised by CYTAvision.
- In Turkey, the game was televised by S Sport Plus.
- In Romania, the game was televised by VOYO.ro.
- In the Netherlands, the game was televised by ESPN.
- In Hungary, the game was televised by Arena 4.

==== Asia–Pacific ====
- In Australia, the game was televised by Seven Network and the on-demand platform 7+ with Fox broadcast feed. It was shown on ESPN, Kayo Sports, and NFL Game Pass on DAZN.
- In New Zealand, the game was televised by TVNZ 1 and its streaming and on-demand platform TVNZ+, as well as ESPN through Sky Sport and NFL Game Pass on DAZN.
- Across the Pacific Islands, the game was televised by ESPN.
- In China, the game was televised by Great Sports (五星体育) which owned by Shanghai Media Group, Guangdong Television's sister channel GDTV Sports and multiple streaming and on-demand platforms such as Tencent Video and Douyin.
- In Japan, the game was televised by Nippon Television's sister channel NTV G+ and NFL Game Pass on DAZN.
- In Hong Kong, the game was televised by Now Sports.
- In the Indian subcontinent, the game was televised by Star Sports and streaming service Disney+ Hotstar.
- In South Korea, the game was televised by Coupang Play and NFL Game Pass on DAZN.
- In Taiwan, the game was televised by ELTA Sports, which they handled the coverage exclusively for the Chunghwa Telecom MOD platform since the 2023 season.
- In the Philippines, the game was televised by Premier Sports and its streaming and on-demand platform Blast TV.
- In Thailand, the game was televised by TrueVisions.
- In Indonesia, this was the final NFL game streamed by over-the-top service Mola before the service shutted down at the end of 2025. Media rights for NFL broadcasts will be moved to Emtek Group's (Nex Parabola and Indonesian over-the-top streaming platform Vidio) from the 2025 season onwards.
- In Singapore, the game was televised by Hub Sport2.

==== Middle East and Africa ====
- Across Sub-Saharan Africa, the game was televised by ESPN across multiple different providers including DStv, GOtv, and StarTimes.
- In Israel, the game was televised by METV and Sport 5.
- In Saudi Arabia and across the Middle East and North Africa, the game was televised by SSC and streaming service Shahid.

== Entertainment ==
=== Pregame ===
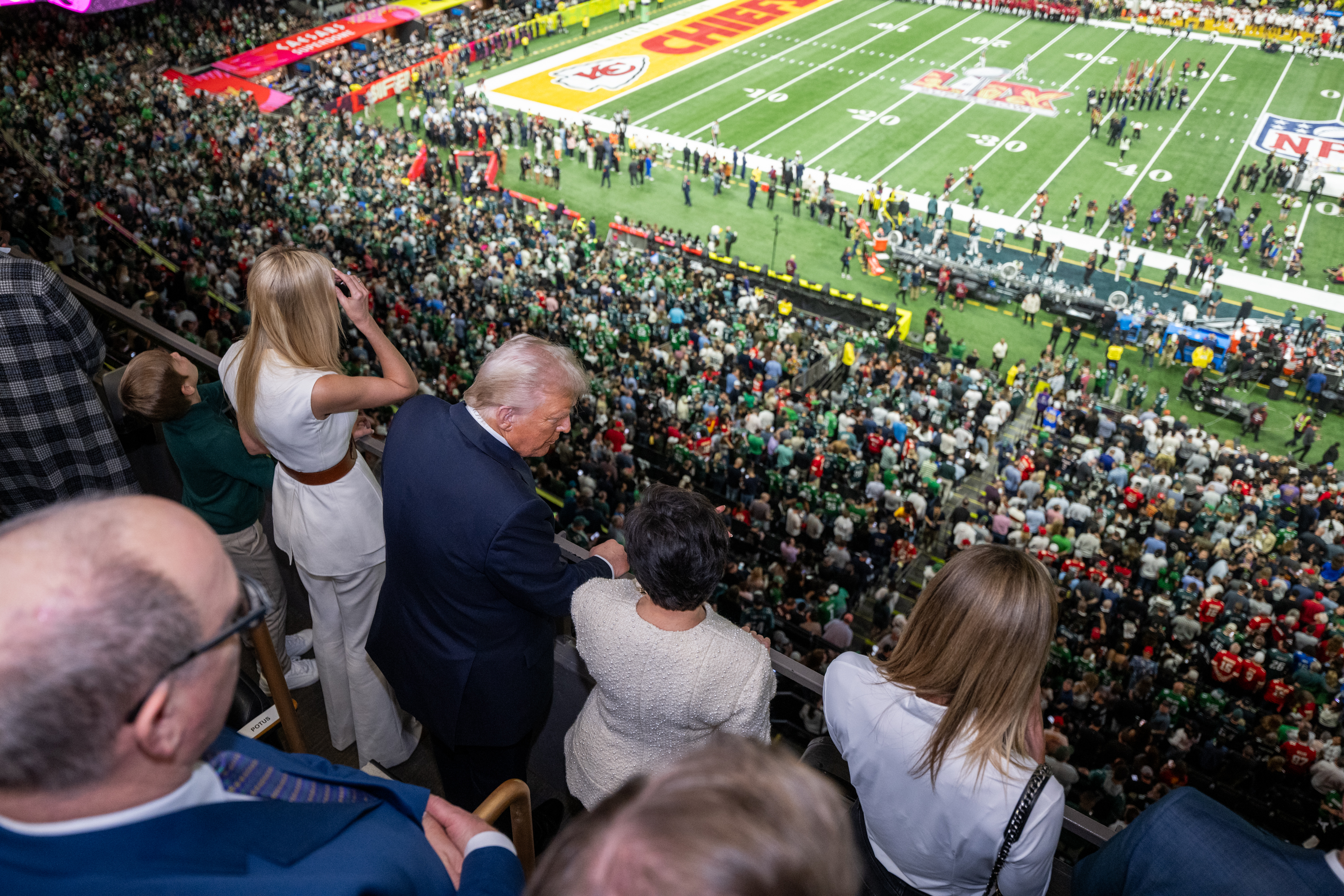
Donald Trump attending the Super Bowl

Fox broadcast its pre-game show from a parade float-inspired stage on Bourbon Street. Fox Sports president of production Brad Zager said that, following the January 1, 2025 truck attack in New Orleans, "[we] felt stronger about the fact that we have to show the country that Bourbon Street's okay, that we owe it to Bourbon Street and we owe it to New Orleans to show that that event isn't going to stop the spirit of Bourbon Street".

During its pre-game show, Fox aired an interview between Fox News anchor Bret Baier and President Donald Trump, resuming a tradition of Super Bowl presidential interviews that had been put on hold during Joe Biden's administration. Trump was the first sitting president to attend a Super Bowl.

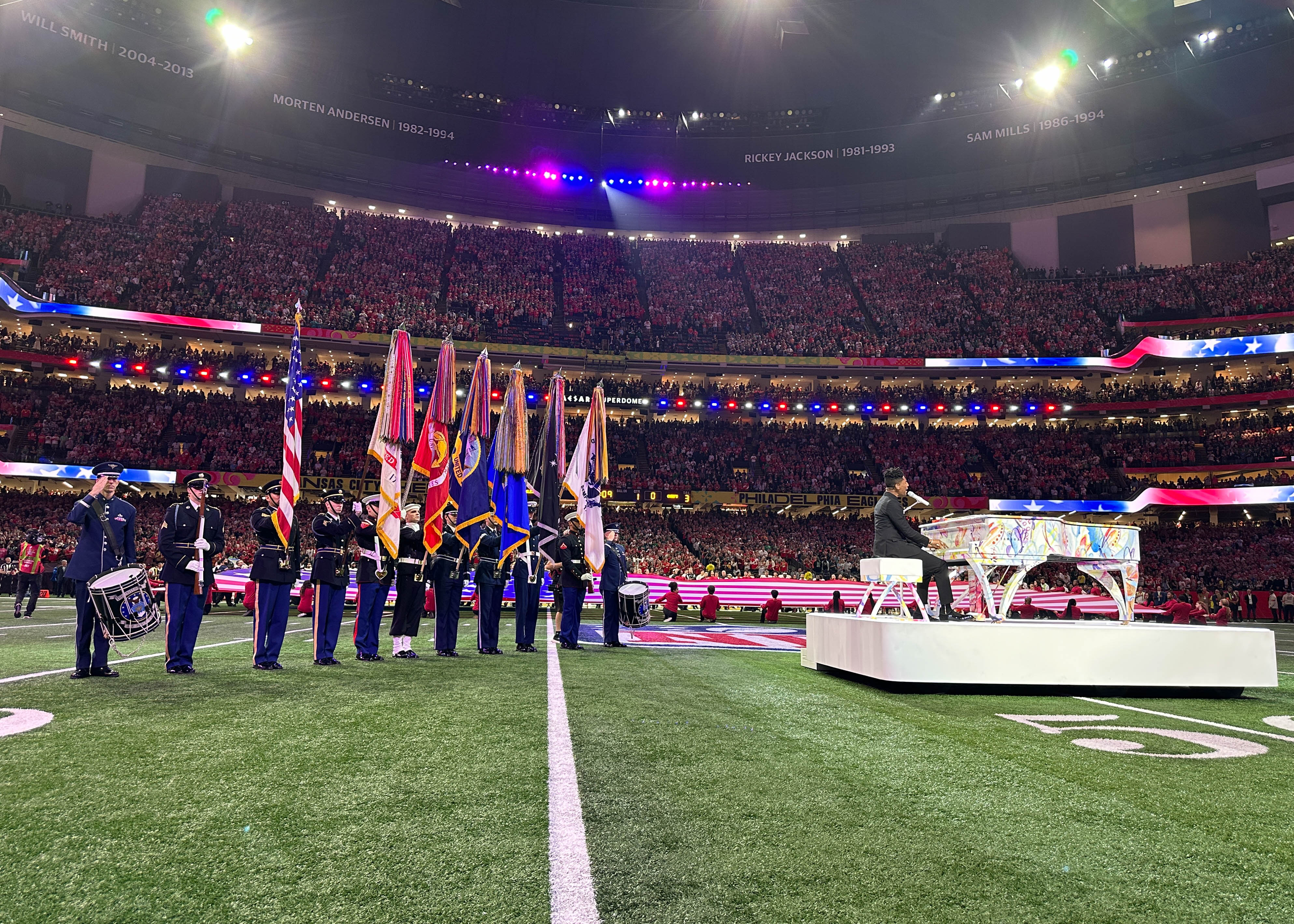
Jon Batiste performed the national anthem at the game

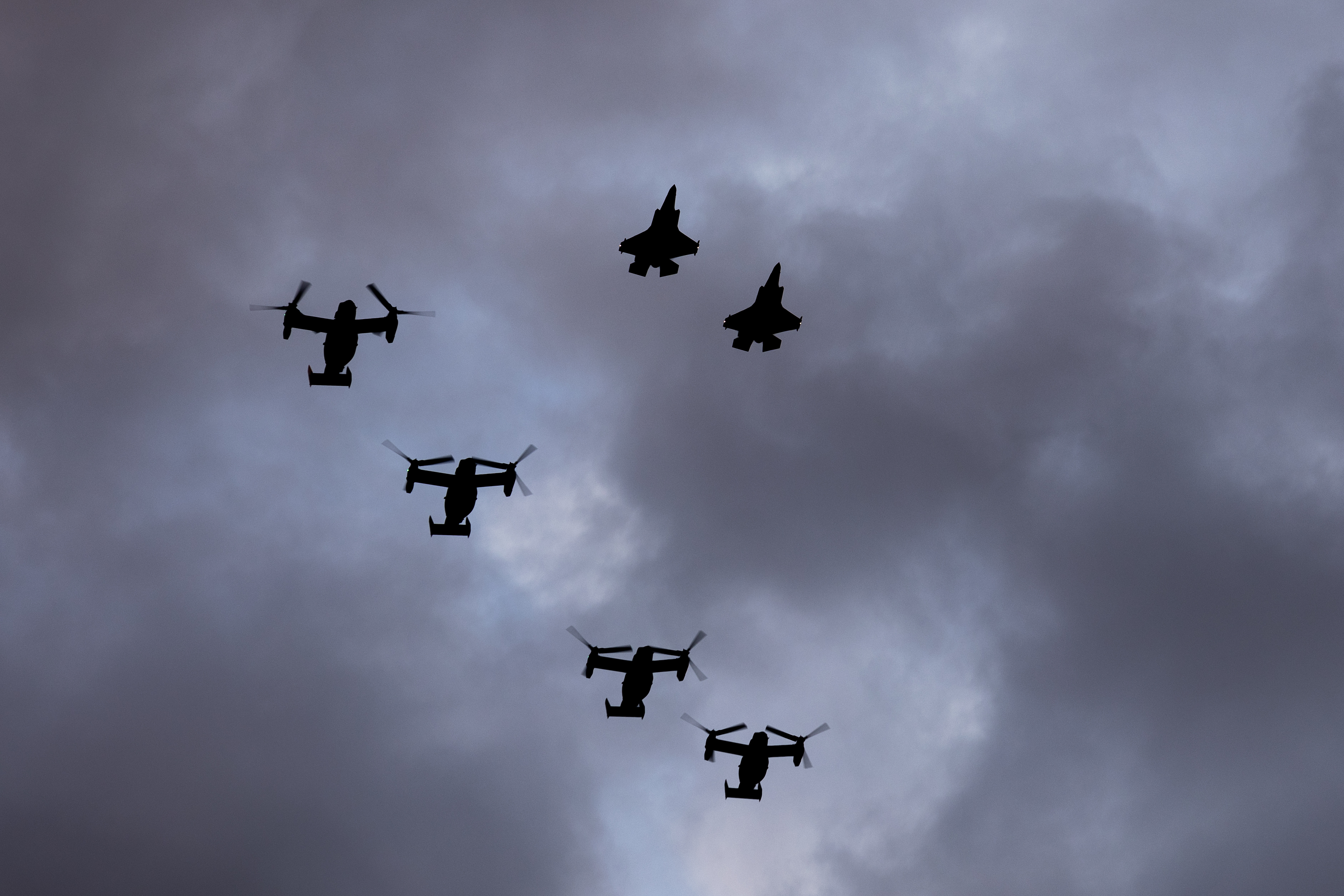
U.S. Marine Corps F-35B Lightning II aircraft with Marine Fighter Attack Squadron (VMFA) 542 and MV-22B Ospreys, tiltrotor aircraft, with Marine Medium Tiltrotor Squadron (VMM) 774 and VMM-764 perform a formation flight over New Orleans, Feb. 7, 2025. (U.S. Marine Corps photo by Lance Cpl. Van Hoang)

Jazz and R&B singer Jon Batiste performed the U.S. national anthem, musician Trombone Shorty and contemporary Christian music singer Lauren Daigle performed "America the Beautiful", and R&B singer Ledisi accompanied by the Greater New Orleans High School Choral Collective performed "Lift Every Voice and Sing". Stephanie Nogueras and Otis Jones IV provided American Sign Language (ASL) interpretation. The anthem was concluded with a flyover by the U.S. Marine Corps of two F-35B Lightning II fighters of Marine Fighter Attack Squadron VMFA-542 and four MV-22 Ospreys of Marine Medium Tiltrotor Squadron VMM-774 and VMM-764.

Two unannounced surprise performances also were part of the pregame festivities. First was a pre-recorded rendition of "Hold My Hand" by Lady Gaga in recognition of the terror attack in New Orleans, the southern California wildfires, the Potomac River mid-air collision, Hurricane Helene, Hurricane Milton, and the Med Jets Flight 056 accident, which was taped on Bourbon Street. After that was a live performance by New Orleans native Harry Connick Jr. alongside the Southern University Wall of Sound marching band, and other local musicians.

=== Halftime ===
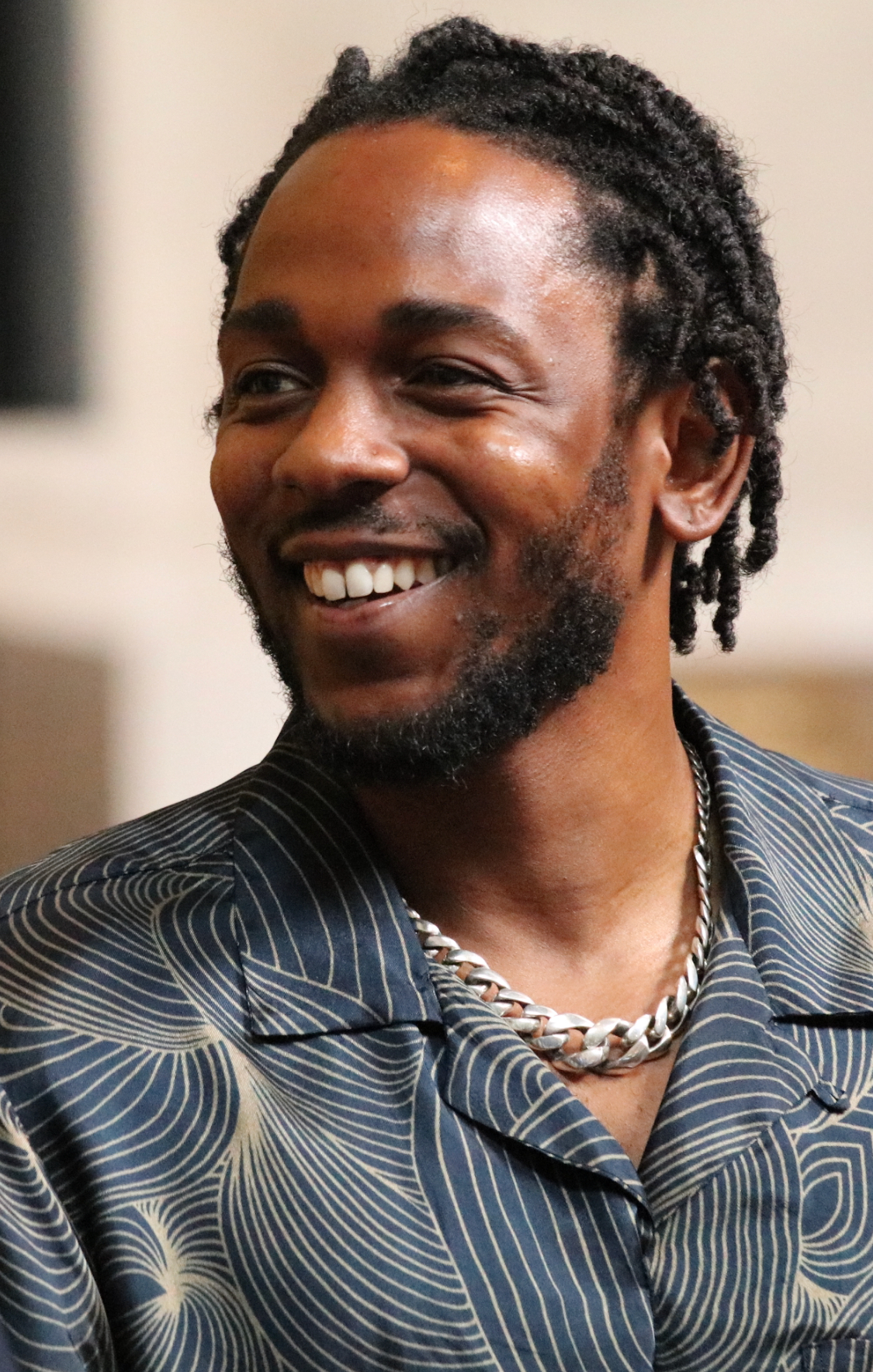
Kendrick Lamar, pictured in 2018, the Super Bowl LIX halftime show performer

Rapper Kendrick Lamar, who co-headlined the Super Bowl LVI halftime show in 2022, headlined the halftime show. SZA was a guest in the show. Actor Samuel L. Jackson made a surprise cameo as Uncle Sam, and retired tennis player Serena Williams as a background dancer. Matt Maxey, Alexis Kashar, and Howard Rosenblum were American Sign Language (ASL) interpreters for the halftime show.

== Game summary ==
=== First half ===
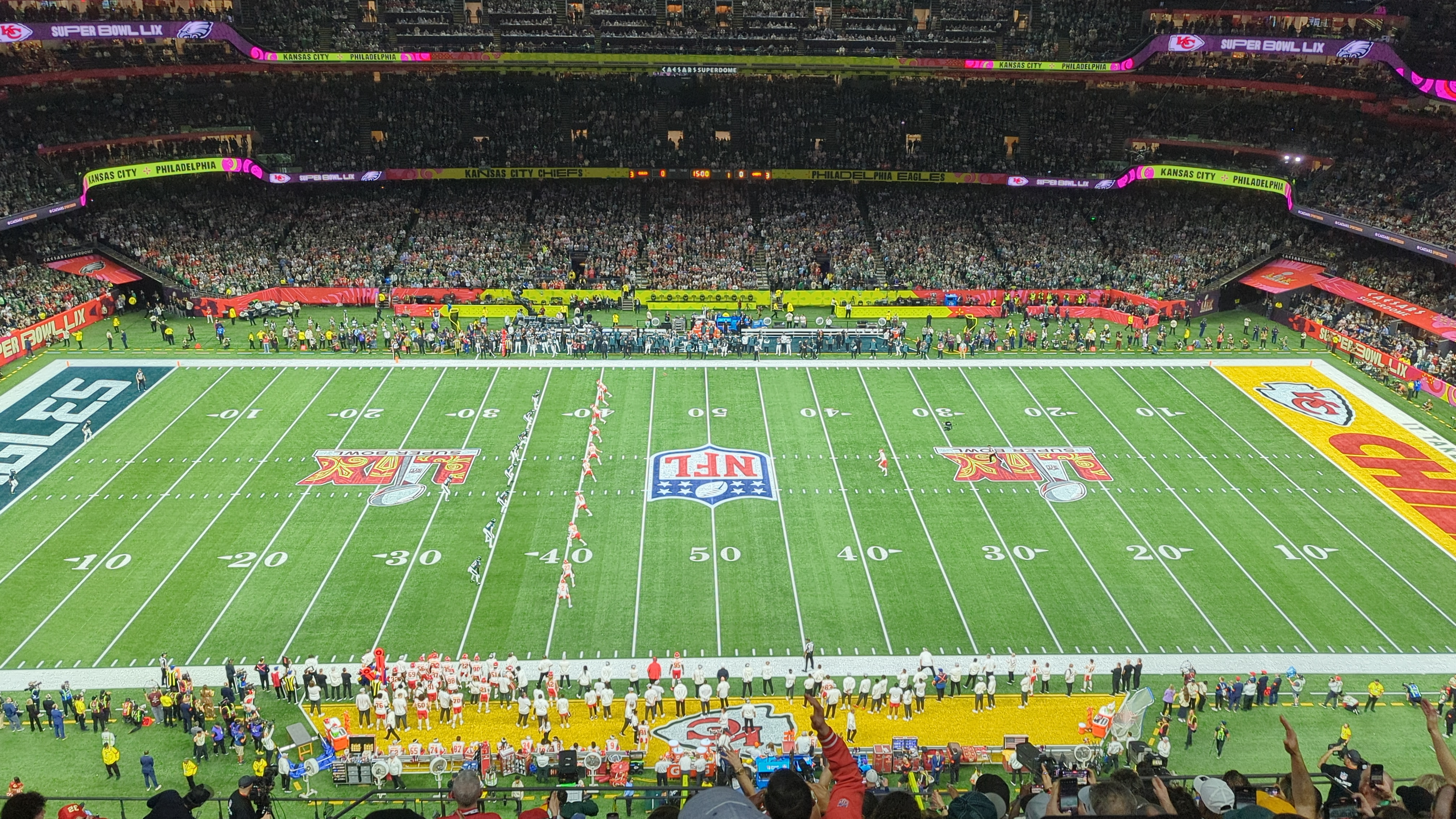
Opening kickoff of Super Bowl LIX

After the Chiefs won the coin toss and deferred possession to the second half, the Eagles received the opening kickoff, which was a touchback. The Eagles' initial drive of six plays gained 20 yards to midfield; however, an offensive pass interference call on A. J. Brown negated a 32-yard pass on fourth down, forcing them to punt. After a 53-yard punt by Braden Mann, the Chiefs' drive began on their own 12 following a 5-yard return by Nikko Remigio.

Quarterback Patrick Mahomes completed his first pass 11 yards to JuJu Smith-Schuster for a first down. After a 1-yard pass and two incomplete throws, Matt Araiza punted 58 yards from the Chiefs' 24. The punt was returned 13 yards by Cooper DeJean, setting the Eagles up at their 31 to begin their second drive. Subsequently, the Eagles put together a 7-play, 69-yard touchdown drive that included a 20-yard pass to Dallas Goedert. Although Jahan Dotson caught a pass that was initially signaled a touchdown, he was ruled short of the goal line; regardless, Jalen Hurts scored with a quarterback sneak using the team's signature Tush Push play for a 1-yard touchdown.

After a three-and-out and subsequent punt by the Chiefs, the Eagles got to the Chiefs' 30-yard line on an 11-play drive that ended with an interception thrown by Hurts to Bryan Cook at the Chiefs' 2-yard line at the start of the second quarter. However, the Chiefs failed to take advantage of the turnover, and punted again after another three-and-out. After Jake Elliott kicked a 48-yard field goal to increase the Eagles' lead to 10–0, Mahomes threw an interception to DeJean, who returned it 38 yards for a touchdown. Both teams then traded punts before Mahomes threw another interception to Zack Baun shortly after the two-minute warning, which set up a 12-yard touchdown pass from Hurts to Brown, extending the Eagles' lead to 24–0 before halftime.

=== Second half ===
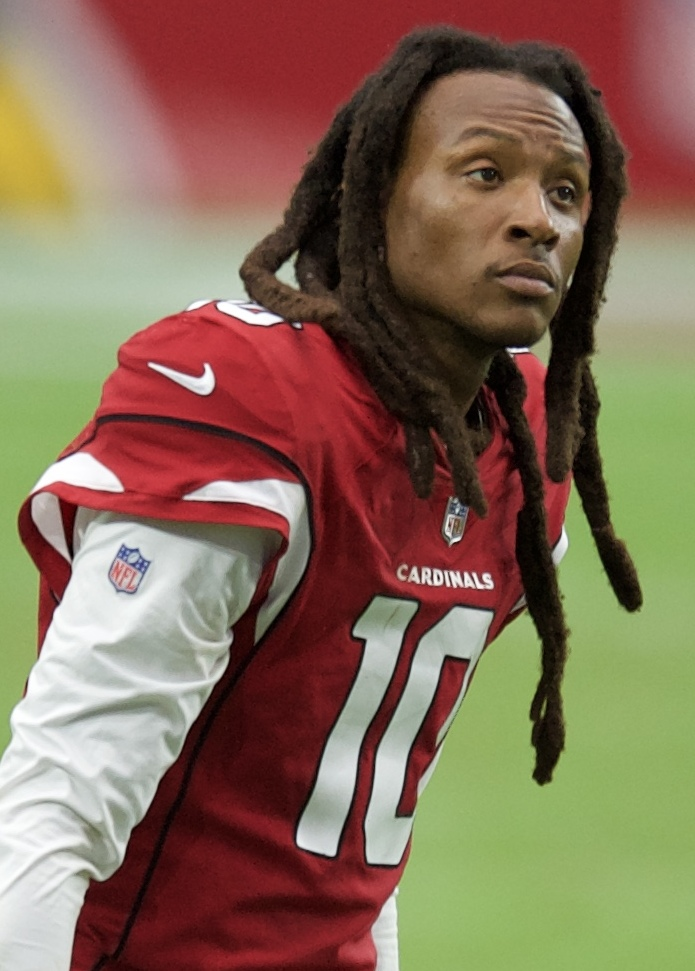
DeAndre Hopkins, pictured in September 2020, caught a touchdown and a two-point conversion pass for the Chiefs in the fourth quarter.

The second half began with an Eagles kickoff, which resulted in a touchback. Despite gaining a first down with a pass to Xavier Worthy, Mahomes was sacked twice in the next two plays and the Chiefs' drive stalled at their own 37. The Eagles responded by driving down the field 69 yards, including a 16-yard and 14-yard run by Hurts, which ended with a 29-yard field goal from Jake Elliott.

The Chiefs' next drive took them five plays and 17 yards to their own 47-yard line. Facing a fourth down, a pass from Mahomes to DeAndre Hopkins fell incomplete after it was batted away by Avonte Maddox, resulting in a turnover on downs. On the next play, Hurts threw a 46-yard touchdown pass to DeVonta Smith, increasing the Eagles' lead to 34–0. This play was nicknamed "The Dagger" by many Eagles players, coaches, and fans due to its significance in putting the game seemingly out of reach for Kansas City. The Chiefs responded with a 24-yard touchdown pass from Mahomes to Worthy at the end of the third quarter, their first score of the game, but failed a two-point conversion attempt from Mahomes to tight end Travis Kelce, trimming Philadelphia's lead to 28 points.

In the fourth quarter, after a 48-yard field goal from Elliott, Mahomes fumbled the ball on a strip sack by Milton Williams, which was recovered by Williams himself at the Chiefs' 18-yard line. Although an unsportsmanlike conduct penalty was called on Williams, Elliott converted a 50-yard field goal attempt, making the score 40–6. On the next drive, Mahomes threw a 7-yard pass to DeAndre Hopkins for a touchdown; the corresponding 2-point conversion from Mahomes to Justin Watson was successful. The Eagles proceeded to bench their starters and allowed their backups to play and take snaps in the final minutes of the game, and after the Eagles turned the ball over on downs, Mahomes responded with a 50-yard touchdown pass to Worthy and another successful 2-point conversion with a pass to Hopkins, cutting the Chiefs' deficit to 18 points for a 40–22 score. A subsequent onside kick was recovered by the Eagles, who ran out the clock.

=== Game statistics ===
Philadelphia outperformed Kansas City on both sides of the ball. Philadelphia quarterback Jalen Hurts, who was ultimately named Super Bowl MVP, completed 17 of 22 attempts for 221 yards, threw an interception, and scored three touchdowns: two passing, one rushing. He also rushed for 72 yards, setting a new record for quarterback rushing yards in the Super Bowl; Hurts had set the prior record of 70 yards in Super Bowl LVII. The Eagles were less successful on the ground: their star running back, Saquon Barkley, rushed 25 times for 57 yards, averaging 2.3 yards per carry in what was, statistically speaking, one of his worst games of the season. Nevertheless, Barkley's Super Bowl performance was enough for him to break Terrell Davis's record for combined single-season and postseason rushing yards, with 2,504.

Analysts praised the Eagles defense, particularly the defensive line, for stifling Patrick Mahomes and the Chiefs offense. Mahomes was sacked six times, threw two interceptions, and lost a fumble. He finished the game with 257 passing yards and three touchdowns. In the first half, the Chiefs scored no points and only gained 23 yards, the lowest first-half yardage since the New England Patriots in Super Bowl XX and the second-lowest overall. The Eagles did not blitz during the game, which was noted as a sign of the defensive line's success.

Super Bowl LIX was also noted for its quality rookie play. Philadelphia rookie cornerback Cooper DeJean intercepted a pass from Mahomes and returned it for a touchdown, becoming the second rookie in Super Bowl history to achieve a pick-six, after Reggie Phillips in Super Bowl XX which was also played at the Superdome, as well as the first player in Super Bowl history to score a touchdown on his birthday. Kansas City rookie wide receiver Xavier Worthy set the rookie record for receiving yards and touchdowns in the Super Bowl, with 157 and 2, respectively. He also became the first rookie to record 150 or more receiving yards and two touchdowns in any playoff game.

=== Box score ===
Super Bowl LIX – Kansas City Chiefs vs Philadelphia Eagles – Game summary

Quarter	1	2	3	4	Total
Chiefs	0	0	6	16	22
Eagles	7	17	10	6	40

at Caesars Superdome, New Orleans, Louisiana

- Date: February 9, 2025
- Game time: 6:30 p.m. EST/5:30 p.m. CST
- Game weather: None (indoor stadium)
- Game attendance: 65,719
- Referee: Ronald Torbert
- TV announcers (Fox): Kevin Burkhardt, Tom Brady, Erin Andrews and Tom Rinaldi
- Recap, Game Book

Scoring summary

Quarter	Time	Drive			Team	Scoring information	Score	
Quarter	Time	Plays	Yards	TOP	Team	Scoring information	KC	PHI
1	6:15	7	69	3:25	PHI	Jalen Hurts 1-yard touchdown run, Jake Elliott kick good	0	7
2	8:38	7	27	3:59	PHI	48-yard field goal by Elliott	0	10
2	7:03	—	—	—	PHI	Interception returned 38 yards for touchdown by Cooper DeJean, Elliott kick good	0	17
2	1:35	2	14	0:10	PHI	A. J. Brown 12-yard touchdown reception from Hurts, Elliott kick good	0	24
3	5:18	12	69	6:42	PHI	29-yard field goal by Elliott	0	27
3	2:40	1	46	0:07	PHI	DeVonta Smith 46-yard touchdown reception from Hurts, Elliott kick good	0	34
3	0:34	5	90	2:06	KC	Xavier Worthy 24-yard touchdown reception from Patrick Mahomes, 2-point pass failed	6	34
4	9:51	10	40	5:43	PHI	48-yard field goal by Elliott	6	37
4	8:01	4	1	1:41	PHI	50-yard field goal by Elliott	6	40
4	2:54	12	75	5:07	KC	DeAndre Hopkins 7-yard touchdown reception from Mahomes, 2-point pass to Justin Watson good	14	40
4	1:48	1	50	0:08	KC	Xavier Worthy 50-yard touchdown reception from Mahomes, 2-point pass to Hopkins good	22	40
"TOP" = time of possession. For other American football terms, see Glossary of American football.							22	40

== Final statistics ==
=== Statistical comparison ===
Team-to-team comparison
Statistic	Kansas City Chiefs	Philadelphia Eagles
First downs	12	21
First downs rushing	1	7
First downs passing	11	11
First downs penalty	0	3
Third down efficiency	3–11	3–12
Fourth down efficiency	0–1	0–1
Total net yards	275	345
Net yards rushing	49	135
Rushing attempts	11	45
Yards per rush	4.5	3.0
Yards passing	226	210
Passing–completions/attempts	21–32	17–23
Times sacked–total yards	6–31	2–11
Interceptions thrown	2	1
Punt returns–total yards	1–5	3–27
Kickoff returns–total yards	3–84	1–25
Interceptions–total return yards	1–0	2–38
Punts–average yardage	6–51.8	2–48
Fumbles lost	1	0
Penalties–yards	7–75	8–59
Time of possession	23:02	36:58
Turnovers	3	1

Records set (Unless noted as "NFL Championships", "Single Postseason" or "Pro Football History", all records refer only to Super Bowls)
Most rushing yards, game, Quarterback	72	Jalen Hurts (Philadelphia)
Highest completion percentage, career (min. 40 attempts)	73.33% (44–60)	Jalen Hurts (2 games)
Most rushing yards, "Total Season"; Regular plus post season games	2,504	Saquon Barkley (Philadelphia)
Most fumbles, career	6	Patrick Mahomes (Kansas City)
Most fumbles recovered, career	5	Patrick Mahomes (Kansas City)
Most receptions, career	35	Travis Kelce (Kansas City)
Highest average punt, game (minimum 4 punts)	51.8 yds (6–311)	Matt Araiza (Kansas City)
Records tied
Most field goals, game	4	Jake Elliott (Philadelphia)
Most field goals, career	9	Jake Elliott (3 games)
Most rushing touchdowns, career, Quarterback	4	Jalen Hurts
Most 2 point conversions, game	1	Justin Watson (Kansas City); DeAndre Hopkins (Kansas City)
Fewest points, first half	0	Kansas City
Most two point conversions, game	2	Kansas City
Fewest rushing touchdowns, game	0	Kansas City
Fewest first downs, rushing, game	1	Kansas City
Most field goals, game	4	Philadelphia

=== Individual statistics ===
Kansas City statistics
Chiefs passing
	C/ATT^{[1]}	Yds	TD	INT	Rating
Patrick Mahomes	21/32	257	3	2	95.4
Chiefs rushing
	Car^{[2]}	Yds	TD	Lg^{[3]}	Yds/Car
Patrick Mahomes	4	25	0	8	6.3
Kareem Hunt	3	9	0	6	3.0
Samaje Perine	1	8	0	8	8.0
Isiah Pacheco	3	7	0	6	2.3
Chiefs receiving
	Rec^{[4]}	Yds	TD	Lg^{[3]}	Target^{[5]}
Xavier Worthy	8	157	2	50	8
Travis Kelce	4	39	0	13	6
DeAndre Hopkins	2	18	1	11	5
JuJu Smith-Schuster	2	16	0	11	2
Marquise Brown	2	15	0	9	6
Kareem Hunt	1	5	0	5	1
Isiah Pacheco	1	5	0	5	2
Noah Gray	1	2	0	2	1
Samaje Perine	0	0	0	0	1

Philadelphia statistics
Eagles passing
	C/ATT^{[1]}	Yds	TD	INT	Rating
Jalen Hurts	17/22	221	2	1	119.7
Kenny Pickett	0/1	0	0	0	39.6
Eagles rushing
	Car^{[2]}	Yds	TD	Lg^{[3]}	Yds/Car
Jalen Hurts	11	72	1	17	6.5
Saquon Barkley	25	57	0	10	2.3
Kenneth Gainwell	6	10	0	4	1.7
Kenny Pickett	3	–4	0	–1	–1.3
Eagles receiving
	Rec^{[4]}	Yds	TD	Lg^{[3]}	Target^{[5]}
DeVonta Smith	4	69	1	46	5
A. J. Brown	3	43	1	22	5
Jahan Dotson	2	42	0	27	3
Saquon Barkley	6	40	0	22	7
Dallas Goedert	2	27	0	20	2
Johnny Wilson	0	0	0	0	1

Notes

- ^{^[1]} Completions/attempts
- ^{^[2]} Carries
- ^{^[3]} Long gain
- ^{^[4]} Receptions
- ^{^[5]} Times targeted

== Starting lineups ==
Starting lineups for Super Bowl LIX
Kansas City	Position		Philadelphia
Offense
Xavier Worthy	WR		Jahan Dotson
JuJu Smith-Schuster	WR		DeVonta Smith
DeAndre Hopkins	WR		A. J. Brown
Travis Kelce	TE		Dallas Goedert
Joe Thuney	LT		Jordan Mailata
Mike Caliendo	LG		Landon Dickerson
Creed Humphrey	C		Cam Jurgens
Trey Smith	RG		Mekhi Becton
Jawaan Taylor	RT		Lane Johnson
Patrick Mahomes	QB		Jalen Hurts
Isiah Pacheco	RB		Saquon Barkley
Defense
Chris Jones	DT		Jordan Davis
Tershawn Wharton	DT		Jalen Carter
Mike Danna	DE	LB	Josh Sweat
Leo Chenal	LB		Nolan Smith
Nick Bolton	LB		Zack Baun
Drue Tranquill	LB		Oren Burks
Chamarri Conner	DB		Cooper DeJean
Trent McDuffie	CB		Darius Slay
Jaylen Watson	CB		Quinyon Mitchell
Justin Reid	S		Reed Blankenship
Bryan Cook	S		C. J. Gardner-Johnson

== Officials ==
Super Bowl LIX featured seven officials, a replay-official, a replay assistant, and eight alternate officials. The numbers in parentheses below indicate their uniform numbers.

- Game officials:
  - Referee: Ronald Torbert (62)
  - Umpire: Mike Morton (89)
  - Down judge: Max Causey (21)
  - Line judge: Mark Stewart (75)
  - Field judge: Mearl Robinson (31)
  - Side judge: Boris Cheek (41)
  - Back judge: Jonah Monroe (120)
  - Replay official: Kevin Brown
  - Replay assistant: NFL Front Office
- Alternate officials:
  - Referee: Carl Cheffers (51)
  - Umpire: Duane Heydt (42)
  - Down judge: Dana McKenzie (8)
  - Line judge: Julian Mapp (10)
  - Field judge: Anthony Flemming (90)
  - Side judge: Chad Hill (125)
  - Back judge: Greg Yette (38)
  - Replay official: Matt Sumstine

Torbert served as a referee for a second Super Bowl and his first was in Super Bowl LVI. Morton was the second official to work a Super Bowl after participating in one as a player (joining linebacker Terry Killens in Super Bowl LVIII), and the first to do so after winning a Super Bowl. Morton won Super Bowl XXXIV playing linebacker with the St. Louis Rams.

== Aftermath ==
On April 28, 2025, the Philadelphia Eagles visited President Donald Trump at the White House to celebrate their Super Bowl LIX victory. Approximately 20-25 players attended the South Lawn ceremony, with several players, including QB Jalen Hurts, skipping the event due to scheduling conflicts. This visit marked a contrast to 2018, when a planned visit was canceled over players kneeling for the national anthem.

The Chiefs did not make it back to the postseason in the 2025 season. In a Week 15 game, Patrick Mahomes suffered a torn anterior cruciate ligament. This was the first time since 2014 they failed to qualify for the postseason, making this the first season in the Mahomes-era in which they missed the playoffs. After a Week 16 loss to the Tennessee Titans, the Chiefs would suffer their first losing season since 2012.

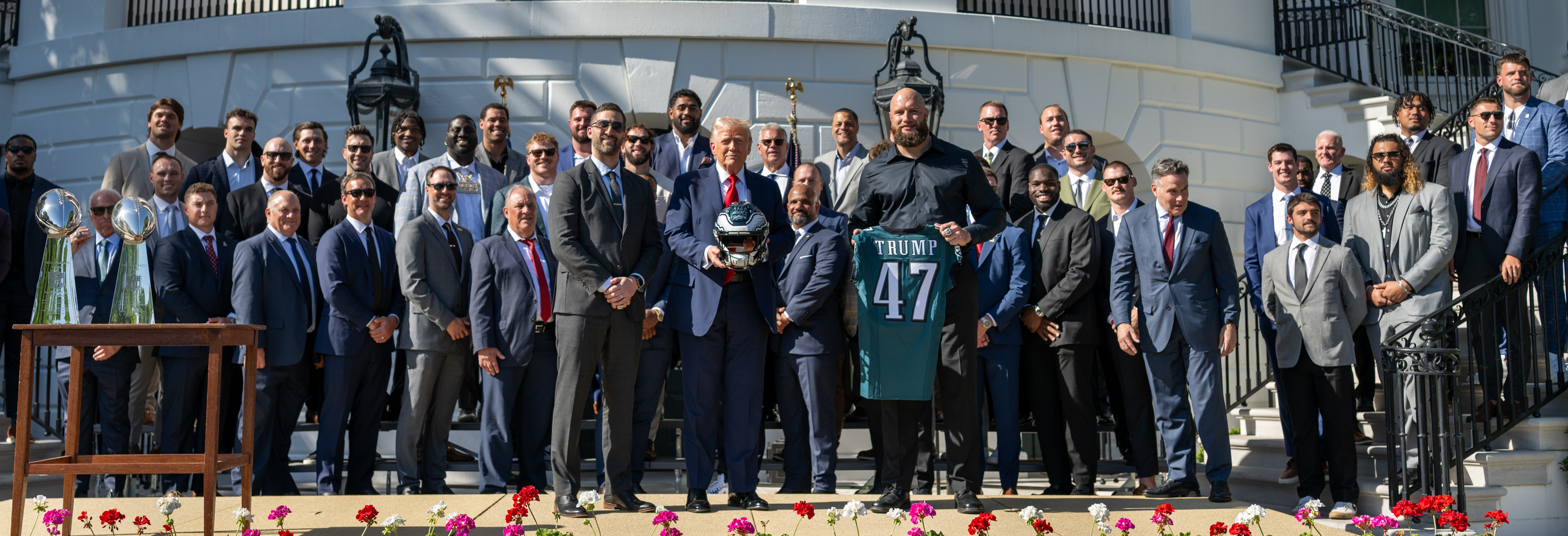
Philadelphia Eagles with President Donald Trump

Just like what happened after their last Super Bowl appearance, the Eagles lost their offensive coordinator, Kellen Moore, to a head coaching opportunity with the New Orleans Saints. This hurt their offense the following season. Barkley got off to a slow start to the season and finished with just 1,140 rush yards (this in comparison to his historic 2,005 rush season in 2024). Additionally, a season-long discontented A. J. Brown saw his numbers stay stagnant from the previous season, in what turned out to be his final season in Philadelphia. The Eagles started 4–0, but went 7–6 in their remaining games, finishing 11-6. They still won the NFC East, but lost the NFC Wild Card Game to the San Francisco 49ers.
