= Markus Jones =

American gridiron football player (born 1996)

Profile
- Position: Linebacker

Personal information
- Born: January 10, 1996 (age 30); Hanau, Germany
- Listed height: 6 ft 3 in (1.91 m)
- Listed weight: 249 lb (113 kg)

Career information
- High school: Crowley (Crowley, Texas, U.S.)
- College: Angelo State (2014–2018)
- NFL draft: 2019: undrafted

Career history
- Baltimore Ravens (2019)*; Green Bay Packers (2019)*; St. Louis BattleHawks (2020)*; Dallas Renegades (2020)*; Team 9 (2020)*; Saskatchewan Roughriders (2021)*
- * Offseason or practice squad member only

Markus Jones (born January 10, 1996) is a former American football linebacker. He previously played in the National Football League (NFL) for the Green Bay Packers and Baltimore Ravens. Jones played college football for the Angelo State University Rams.

== Early life ==
Jones played football for the Crowley High School Eagles with 90 tackles and 7 sacks during his senior season. He also played basketball and competed in track and field, recording a 6'8'' high jump in 2014.

== College career ==
Jones signed with the Division II Lone Star Conference Angelo State Rams of San Angelo, Texas in 2014 as a defensive end, earning numerous accolades over the course of his collegiate career. As a senior, Jones recorded 84 tackles including 36.5 tackles for loss, the highest number recorded across all divisions of NCAA football. Jones also made 17.5 sacks in 2018, breaking the Angelo State sack record with a total of 37 career sacks, in addition to two blocked kicks and four forced fumbles.

In January 2019, Jones competed in the annual East-West Shrine Game after being named the 2018 winner of the Gene Upshaw Award as the best offensive or defensive lineman in Division II football. During practices, Jones received significant attention after pushing offensive tackle Paul Adams to the ground during one-on-one drills.

== Professional career ==
After the 2019 NFL draft, Jones signed with the Baltimore Ravens as an undrafted free agent. Following an injury to Ravens quarterback Robert Griffin III, Jones was waived and subsequently claimed off waivers by the Packers. Jones made a strong preseason showing, including two back-to-back turnover plays versus the Kansas City Chiefs. Jones did not make the Packers roster at the end of the preseason.

In October 2019, Jones was selected in round 8 of 30 during open portion of the 2020 XFL draft by the St. Louis BattleHawks.

Following the XFL draft, Jones spent a December 2019 mini-camp with the BattleHawks before being traded by St. Louis to the Dallas Renegades at the end of mini-camp. Following the XFL's January 2020 league-wide training camp in Houston, Jones was waived by the Renegades and assigned to the XFL's Team 9 practice squad, also in Dallas, Texas where he trained until the XFL suspended operations during the COVID-19 pandemic. He had his contract terminated when the league suspended operations on April 10, 2020.

Jones signed with the Saskatchewan Roughriders of the CFL on December 17, 2020. He was released on July 20, 2021.

== Personal life ==
Jones graduated from Angelo State University in December 2018 with a Bachelor of Science degree in Exercise Science and minors in Biology and Psychology. He is married to a fellow Angelo State graduate.
