= Edgecliff Village, Texas =

Town of Edgecliff Village, Texas
- town
- Flag

- Location of Edgecliff Village in Tarrant County, Texas
- Coordinates: 32°39′22″N 97°20′26″W
- country: United States
- state: Texas
- county: Tarrant

Area
  - Total: 1.19 sq mi (3.09 km^{2})
  - Land: 1.19 sq mi (3.09 km^{2})
  - Water: 0 sq mi (0.00 km^{2})
- Elevation: 719 ft (219 m)

Population (2020)
  - Total: 3,788
  - Density: 3,180/sq mi (1,230/km^{2})
- Time zone: UTC-6 (CST)
  - Summer (DST): UTC-5 (CDT)
- zip code: 76134
- Area code: 817
- FIPS code: 48-22588
- GNIS feature ID: 2412465
- Website: evgov.org
- "US Gazetteer files: 2010, 2000, and 1990". United States Census Bureau. February 12, 2011.

Edgecliff Village is a town in Tarrant County, Texas, United States. It is an enclave suburb of Fort Worth, and part of the Dallas–Fort Worth metroplex. The population was 2,049 at the 2020 census.

== Geography ==
Edgecliff Village is an enclave community of the city of Fort Worth. According to the United States Census Bureau, the town has a total area of 1.2 square miles (3.1 km^{2}), all land.

== Demographics ==
Historical population
Census	Pop.	Note	%±
1960	339		—
1970	1,143		237.2%
1980	2,695		135.8%
1990	2,715		0.7%
2000	2,550		−6.1%
2010	2,776		8.9%
2020	3,788		36.5%
U.S. Decennial Census

=== 2020 census ===
As of the 2020 census, Edgecliff Village had a population of 3,788. The median age was 40.2 years. 22.8% of residents were under the age of 18 and 19.2% were 65 years of age or older. For every 100 females there were 91.1 males, and for every 100 females age 18 and over there were 90.8 males age 18 and over.

100.0% of residents lived in urban areas, while 0.0% lived in rural areas.

There were 1,318 households in Edgecliff Village, of which 36.6% had children under the age of 18 living in them. Of all households, 57.4% were married-couple households, 14.2% were households with a male householder and no spouse or partner present, and 24.1% were households with a female householder and no spouse or partner present. About 18.4% of all households were made up of individuals and 10.3% had someone living alone who was 65 years of age or older.

There were 1,357 housing units, of which 2.9% were vacant. The homeowner vacancy rate was 1.3% and the rental vacancy rate was 1.4%.

Edgecliff Village racial composition as of 2020 (NH = Non-Hispanic) (Note: Note: the US Census treats Hispanic/Latino as an ethnic category. This table excludes Latinos from the racial categories and assigns them to a separate category. Hispanics/Latinos can be of any race.)
Race	Number	Percentage
White (NH)	1,354	35.74%
Black or African American (NH)	587	15.5%
Native American or Alaska Native (NH)	4	0.11%
Asian (NH)	250	6.6%
Pacific Islander (NH)	2	0.05%
Some Other Race (NH)	8	0.21%
Mixed/Multi-Racial (NH)	115	3.04%
Hispanic or Latino	1,468	38.75%
Total	3,788	

== Economy ==
The town of Edgecliff Village is experiencing a growth spurt, as the remaining 206 acres (0.8 km^{2}) of open prairie are developed for building single-family homes. After this area is built out, there is little open land for housing in the town. This area was held for many years by and purchased from the Hunt family of Texas.

The location of Edgecliff Village is convenient to Interstate 35W and Interstate 20 (also Loop I-820). The largest business in the town is the Fort Worth Star-Telegram, which maintains a printing plant within city limits. The tax rate in Edgecliff Village is lower than in surrounding communities; however, there are few amenities (that is, no public library or park development).

== Education ==
Edgecliff Village is served by the Crowley and Fort Worth Independent School Districts.
