= North Crowley High School =

Location
- 9100 S Hulen St, Fort Worth, TX, 76123; 32.6105°N 97.3945°W

Information
- Type: Public, Secondary
- School district: Crowley Independent School District
- Staff: 205.95 (FTE)
- Grades: 9–12
- Enrollment: 2,933 (2023–2024)
- Student to teacher ratio: 14.24
- Colors: Royal Blue and Silver
- Mascot: Panther
- Website: www.crowleyisdtx.org/nchs

North Crowley High School is a public high school in Fort Worth, Texas. It administers grades 9–12 and is part of the Crowley Independent School District.

The school's colors are royal blue and silver. The school's mascot is the Panther. The school is often colloquially referred to by its nickname, "NoCro," a short form of the full school name. The North Crowley Men's basketball team were Texas 5A State Champions in 2008. In 2003, they were Texas 4A Football State Champions. In the 2024 season, the North Crowley Football Team went 16-0 and won the 6A Division I Football State Championship.

== Academics ==
The school offers Advanced Placement (AP) classes in a number of subjects, and the AP exams may be taken at the end of the school year. Pre-AP and honors classes are also offered. Students may also opt for dual-enrollment at area universities, simultaneously earning high school and university credit. The academic curriculum also includes opportunities for vocational training in a variety of areas, for students who elect to take these classes for elective credit. The school participates in the AVID program, and encourages eligible students to participate in the Duke Talent Identification Program (TIP). The school maintains a chapter of the National Honor Society, and inducts new members based on academic performance and community involvement.

== Notable alumni ==
- Kyan Anderson, basketball player
- Isaiah Crawford, basketball player
- Jason Curtis Fox, American football player
- Keith Langford, basketball player
- Kelvin Lewis, basketball player
- Norense Odiase, basketball player
- Brittainey Raven, basketball player
- Cyril Richardson, American football player
- Willie Warren, basketball player
