= Norense Odiase =

American basketball player

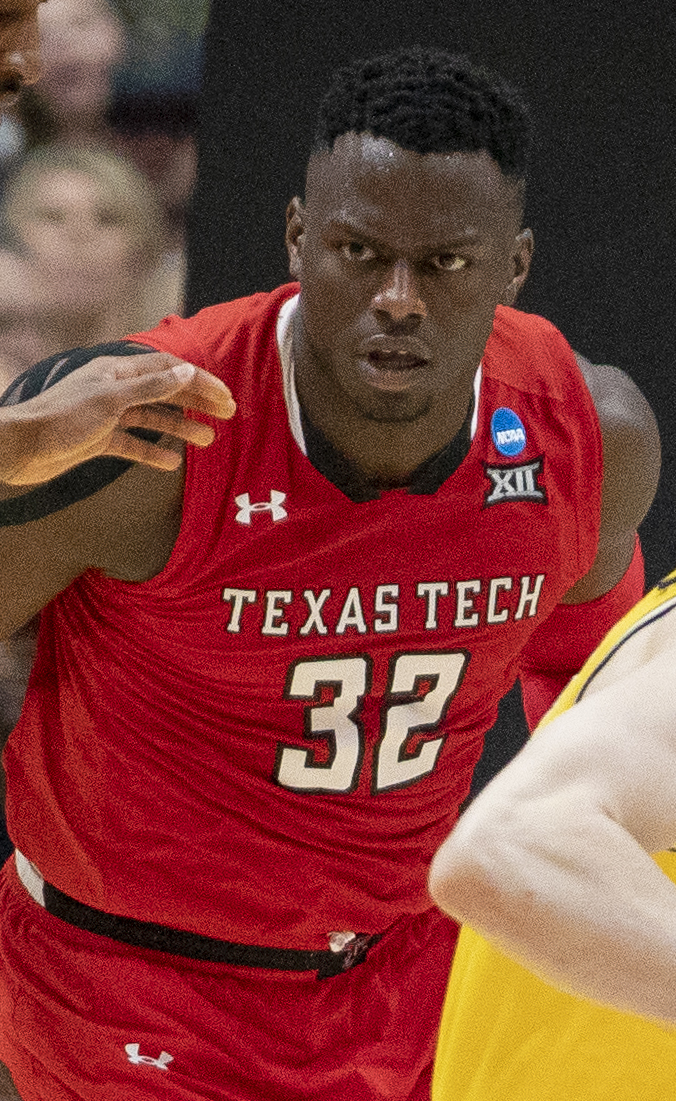
- Odiase with Texas Tech in March 2019

Personal information
- Born: September 14, 1995 (age 31) Fort Worth, Texas
- Listed height: 6 ft 8 in (2.03 m)
- Listed weight: 250 lb (113 kg)

Career information
- High school: North Crowley (Fort Worth, Texas); Elev8 Sports Institute (Delray Beach, Florida)
- College: Texas Tech (2014–2019)
- NBA draft: 2019: undrafted
- Playing career: 2019–2023
- Position: Center

Career history
- 2019–2020: Northern Arizona Suns
- 2020–2021: Brose Bamberg
- 2021: Science City Jena
- 2021: Motor City Cruise
- 2021–2023: Greensboro Swarm
- 2023: Texas Legends
- Stats at Basketball Reference

Norense Odiase (born September 14, 1995) is an American former professional basketball player. He played college basketball for the Texas Tech Red Raiders.

== High school career ==
Odiase played for North Crowley High School in Fort Worth, Texas. As a senior, he averaged 7.8 points and 7.4 rebounds per game, leading his team to a 29–8 record and the Region I semifinals. Upon the recommendation of his coach Tommy Brakel, Odiase played a postgraduate year at Elev8 Sports institute in Delray Beach, Florida, developing his body and explosiveness. On March 14, 2014, he committed to play college basketball for Texas Tech over offers from Georgia, Old Dominion and TCU, among others. Odiase was considered a three-star recruit by 247Sports.

== College career ==
In his first career game for Texas Tech, on November 14, 2014, Odiase recorded 16 points and 10 rebounds in a 71–59 win over Loyola (Maryland). He became the first freshman in program history to register a double-double and start in a season opener and was named Big 12 Newcomer of the Week. As a freshman, Odiase averaged 7.0 points and 4.7 rebounds per game. He averaged 8.5 points and 4.2 rebounds per game as a sophomore, missing over one month, including all of February 2017, with a broken right foot. Three games into his junior season, Odiase suffered a season-ending foot injury and was granted a redshirt. As a junior, Odiase averaged 3.8 points and 4.5 rebounds per game and considered transferring to gain more opportunities. In his senior season, he averaged 4.2 points and 5.4 rebounds per game, helping his team reach the national championship game. Odiase finished with the most career wins in program history.

== Professional career ==
=== Northern Arizona Suns (2019–2020) ===
After going undrafted in the 2019 NBA draft, Odiase took part in the Eurobasket Summer League. He signed a training camp deal with the Phoenix Suns of the National Basketball Association (NBA). In his rookie season, Odiase played for the team's NBA G League affiliate, the Northern Arizona Suns. On December 9, 2019, he posted 14 points, 11 rebounds, four assists and one block in a 125–100 loss to the Salt Lake City Stars. Odiase missed a game against the South Bay Lakers on December 29 with an illness. In 35 games, he averaged 5.5 points and 7.1 rebounds per game.

=== Brose Bamberg (2020–2021) ===
On August 4, 2020, Odiase signed a one-year contract with Brose Bamberg of the Basketball Bundesliga.

=== Science City Jena (2021) ===
On February 19, 2021, Odiase signed with Science City Jena of the German ProA.

=== Motor City Cruise (2021) ===
In October, 2021, he was added to the Motor City Cruise. However, he was waived on November 8.

=== Greensboro Swarm (2021–2023) ===
On December 30, 2021, Odiase was acquired by the Greensboro Swarm of the NBA G League. On February 25, 2023, Odiase was waived by the Greensboro Swarm.

=== Texas Legends (2023) ===
On February 27, 2023, Odiase was acquired by the Texas Legends.

== Personal life ==
Odiase is the son of Nigerian parents, Nick and Osa Odiase. His father is a pharmacist and his mother is a nurse. He has a fraternal twin brother named Nick, as well as older twin sisters. When he was a senior at Texas Tech, two of his cousins died in an automobile accident.
