= Milton Williams =

American football player (born 1999)

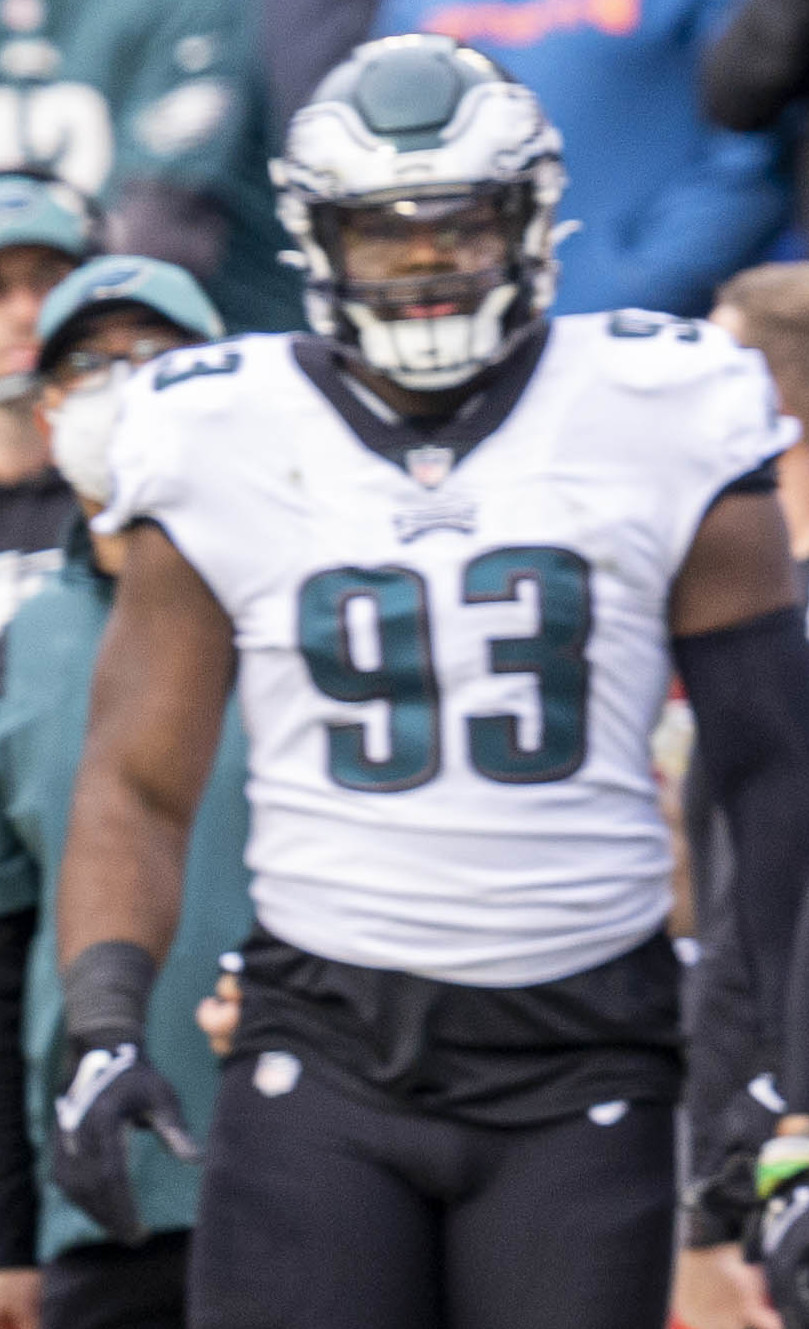
- Williams with the Philadelphia Eagles in 2022

No. 97 – New England Patriots
- Position: Defensive tackle
- Roster status: Active

Personal information
- Born: April 6, 1999 (age 27); Crowley, Texas, U.S.
- Listed height: 6 ft 3 in (1.91 m)
- Listed weight: 290 lb (132 kg)

Career information
- High school: Crowley
- College: Louisiana Tech (2017–2020)
- NFL draft: 2021: 3rd round, 73rd overall pick

Career history
- Philadelphia Eagles (2021–2024); New England Patriots (2025–present)

Awards and highlights
- Super Bowl champion (LIX); First-team All-CUSA (2020)

Career NFL statistics as of 2025
- Total tackles: 161
- Sacks: 15
- Forced fumbles: 2
- Fumble recoveries: 1
- Pass deflections: 7
- Stats at Pro Football Reference

Milton Jawaun Williams (born April 6, 1999) is an American professional football defensive tackle for the New England Patriots of the National Football League (NFL). He played college football for the Louisiana Tech Bulldogs and was selected by the Philadelphia Eagles in the third round of the 2021 NFL draft.

== Early life ==
Williams attended Crowley High School in Crowley, Texas. During his career, he had 300 tackles, 22 sacks and scored four touchdowns. Williams was not heavily recruited coming out of high school and committed to Louisiana Tech University to play college football.

== College career ==
Williams played college football at Louisiana Tech from 2017 to 2020. Initially redshirting his freshman year, Williams developed into a key defensive tackle for the Bulldogs.

In Williams' junior season he had a breakout year, earning First-Team All-Conference USA honors after recording 10 tackles for loss and 4.5 sacks in 10 games. Williams finished his career with 108 tackles and 10.5 sacks. After the 2020 season, he announced that he was forgoing his senior season and entering the 2021 NFL draft.

== Professional career ==
Pre-draft measurables
Height	Weight	Arm length	Hand span	Wingspan	40-yard dash	10-yard split	20-yard split	20-yard shuttle	Three-cone drill	Vertical jump	Broad jump	Bench press
6 ft 3 in (1.91 m)	284 lb (129 kg)	31 1/2 in (0.80 m)	9 3/4 in (0.25 m)	6 ft 6 1/2 in (1.99 m)	4.63 s	1.65 s	2.65 s	4.33 s	6.96 s	38.5 in (0.98 m)	10 ft 1 in (3.07 m)	34 reps
All values from Pro Day

=== Philadelphia Eagles ===
Williams was selected by the Philadelphia Eagles in the third round (73rd overall) of the 2021 NFL draft. On June 3, 2021, Williams signed his four-year rookie contract with the Eagles. During his rookie season in 2021, Williams played in all 17 games, contributing as a depth piece behind veterans like Fletcher Cox and Javon Hargrave. On October 31 Williams recorded his first ever sack on Jared Goff to go along with a career high 4 tackles during a 44–6 victory. He finished the year with 30 total tackles, six tackles for loss, two sacks, and six quarterback hits.

In 2022, Williams continued to develop and played an important role in a dominant Eagles defense that helped the team reach Super Bowl LVII. Williams improved his production, recording 36 tackles, nine quarterback hits, and four sacks. In the Super Bowl, Williams recorded one tackle but the Eagles lost 38–35 to the Kansas City Chiefs.

By the 2023 season, Williams had solidified himself as a crucial part of the defensive line rotation. With increased snaps and greater responsibility, he maintained his reputation as a disruptive interior lineman. Williams steady growth continued to make him a valuable asset to the Eagles' defensive front.

In 2024, Williams remained a key contributor, further refining his technique and impact on the field. With the retirement of Fletcher Cox, Williams saw increased snaps throughout the year. Williams had two sacks and forced and recovered a fumble in the 40–22 win over the Chiefs in Super Bowl LIX.

=== New England Patriots ===
On March 13, 2025, Williams signed a four-year, $104 million contract with the New England Patriots. The contract made Williams the highest-paid Patriots player ever, in terms of annual salary. On September 14 in Week 2 against the Miami Dolphins, Williams recorded two sacks, including the game-sealing sack on Dolphins quarterback Tua Tagovailoa on fourth down in the fourth quarter in the 33–27 win. On November 13 in Week 11 against the New York Jets, Williams exited the game in the first quarter after suffering an ankle injury. Two days later, Williams was placed on injured reserve. He was activated on January 3, 2026, ahead of the team's Week 18 matchup against the Dolphins. He finished the 2025 season playing in 12 games, recording 29 tackles, 14 tackles for loss, and 3.5 sacks.

In the Wild Card Round against the Los Angeles Chargers on January 11, 2026, Williams recorded a crucial sack on Chargers quarterback Justin Herbert late in the fourth quarter to help seal the victory in the 16–3 game, finishing the game with three tackles and two sacks. In the AFC Championship on January 25 against the Denver Broncos, Williams recorded eight quarterback pressures on Broncos quarterback Jarrett Stidham as the Patriots would win 10–7, advancing to Super Bowl LX and Williams' third Super Bowl appearance. Williams recorded a sack in Super Bowl LX, a 29–13 loss to the Seattle Seahawks.

== NFL career statistics ==
Legend
	Won the Super Bowl
	Led the league
**Bold**	Career high

=== Regular season ===
Year	Team	Games		Tackles							Interceptions					Fumbles			
Year	Team	GP	GS	Cmb	Solo	Ast	TFL	QBH	Sck	Sfty	PD	Int	Yds	Lng	TD	FF	FR	Yds	TD
2021	PHI	17	2	30	15	15	6	6	2.0	0	**2**	0	0	0	0	0	0	0	0
2022	PHI	17	0	36	19	17	**9**	6	4.0	0	**2**	0	0	0	0	0	0	0	0
2023	PHI	16	10	**42**	**21**	**21**	3	7	0.5	0	1	0	0	0	0	**1**	0	0	0
2024	PHI	17	7	24	11	13	7	**10**	**5.0**	0	1	0	0	0	0	**1**	**1**	0	0
2025	NE	12	12	29	15	14	8	8	3.5	0	1	0	0	0	0	0	0	0	0
Career		79	31	161	81	80	33	37	15.0	0	7	0	0	0	0	2	1	0	0

=== Playoffs ===
Year	Team	Games		Tackles							Interceptions					Fumbles			
Year	Team	GP	GS	Cmb	Solo	Ast	TFL	QBH	Sck	Sfty	PD	Int	Yds	Lng	TD	FF	FR	Yds	TD
2021	PHI	1	0	4	3	1	1	0	0.0	0	0	0	0	0	0	0	0	0	0
2022	PHI	3	0	3	2	1	0	1	0.0	0	0	0	0	0	0	0	0	0	0
2023	PHI	1	1	2	2	0	1	2	1.0	0	0	0	0	0	0	0	0	0	0
2024	PHI	4	0	**7**	**5**	**2**	2	2	2.0	0	**2**	0	0	0	0	**1**	**1**	0	0
2025	NE	4	4	**7**	**5**	**2**	**4**	**5**	**3.0**	0	1	0	0	0	0	0	0	0	0
Career		13	5	23	17	6	8	10	6.0	0	3	0	0	0	0	1	1	0	0
