= Crowley High School (Texas) =

Coordinates: 32.5785°N 97.3757°W

- 1005 W Main St, Crowley, TX, 76036

Information
- Type: Public, Secondary
- School district: Crowley Independent School District
- Teaching staff: 174.90 (FTE)
- Grades: 9-12
- Enrollment: 2,492 (2023-2024)
- Student to teacher ratio: 14.25
- Colors: Purple and White
- Mascot: Eagle
- Website: www.crowleyisdtx.org/chs

Crowley High School is a high school in Crowley, Texas, and a part of the Crowley Independent School District.

== Notable alumni ==
- Lance Barrett, MLB Umpire
- Bryan Bertino, film director and writer
- Leon Bridges, Grammy nominated singer
- Markus Jones, Canadian Football League linebacker
- Kara Killmer, Actress
- Joey McGuire, head football coach, Texas Tech University
- Gary Reasons, former NFL linebacker
- Drew Smith, MLB pitcher for the New York Mets
- Milton Williams, NFL player
