= Crowley Independent School District =

School district in Texas

Coordinates: 32.6070°N 97.3469°W

Location
- 1900 Crowley Pride Dr, Fort Worth TX, 76134 United States of America

District information
- Type: Public
- Motto: Crowley Pride Unified
- Grades: Pre-K through 12
- Superintendent: Dr. Michael McFarland
- Schools: 27 (2025-26)
- Budget: $206.1 million (2025-26)

Students and staff
- Students: 17,000 (2025-26)
- Teachers: 1,008 (2025)
- Staff: 2175 (2025-26)

Other information
- Website: crowleyisdtx.org

Crowley Independent School District is a public school district based in Crowley, Texas (USA). The Superintendent of Schools is Dr. Michael McFarland.

In addition to Crowley, the district also serves portions of Fort Worth, and Edgecliff Village in south central Tarrant County and Burleson in north central of Johnson County. A small portion of northern Johnson County also lies within the district.

== Schools ==
There are a total of 27 campuses in Crowley Independent School District.

High schools (grades 9-12)
Name	Grades	Established	Mascot	Colors	Location	Additional information
Crowley High School	10-12	1966	Eagles	Purple & White	Crowley	First graduating class in 1968
Crowley Ninth Grade Campus	9	2003	Eagles	Purple & White	Crowley	Adjacent to Crowley HS
North Crowley High School	10-12	1998	Panthers	Royal Blue & Silver	Fort Worth	First graduating class in 1999
North Crowley Ninth Grade Campus	9	2003	Panthers	Royal Blue & Silver	Fort Worth	Adjacent to North Crowley HS

Middle schools (grades 6-8)
Name	Established	Mascot	Colors	Location	Additional information
Crowley Middle School	1965	Panthers	Royal Blue, Black, & White	Fort Worth	
H.F. Stevens Middle School	Unknown	Eagles	Purple & White	Crowley	
Richard J. Allie Middle School	2020	Rams	Green & White	Crowley	
Summer Creek Middle School	2008	Colts	Maroon & Black	Fort Worth	

Middle schools (grades 6-8)
Name	Established	Mascot	Colors	Location	Additional information
Baylor Elementary School	2025	Cowboys	Navy & Silver	Crowley	
S.H. Crowley Elementary School	2008	Coyotes	Red & Black	Crowley	Intermediate school from 2008-19
Crowley Montessori Academy	2024	Monarchs	Orange & Blue	Crowley	
Jackie Carden Elementary School	Unknown	Cougars	Blue & Green	Fort Worth	
Deer Creek Elementary School	Spring 1975	Dragons	Blue & Gold	Crowley	
Sue Crouch Elementary School	2006	Knights	Green & Blue	Fort Worth	Intermediate school from 2006-19
June W. Davis Elementary School	2019	Trailblazers	Teal & Gold	Fort Worth	
J.A. Hargrave Elementary School	2004	Gators	Green & Yellow	Fort Worth	
Mary Harris Elementary School	2010	Huskies	Navy, Silver, & Columbia	Fort Worth	Intermediate school from 2010-19
Meadowcreek Elementary School	Unknown	Mustangs	Red & Black	Fort Worth	
Oakmont Elementary School	Unknown	Hawks	Red & Gold	Fort Worth	
Dallas Park Elementary School	2002	Panthers	Blue & Black	Fort Worth	
Parkway Elementary School	1994	Panthers	Purple & Gray	Fort Worth	
Sidney H. Poynter Elementary School	2005	Bulldogs	Red & Navy	Fort Worth	
Bess Race Elementary School	Unknown	Eagles	Purple & Black	Crowley	
Sycamore Elementary School	Unknown	Stars	Orange & Blue	Fort Worth	
David L. Walker Elementary School	2010	Warriors	Purple & Black	Fort Worth	Intermediate school from 2010-19

Other schools
Name	Established	Location	Additional information
Bill R. Johnson CTE Center	2010	Crowley	
Crowley Collegiate Academy	2016	Crowley	Currently located in Johnson CTE Center; new campus will open in 2027
Crowley Learning Center	Unknown	Crowley	
