= New Orleans Baby Doll Ladies =

Dance group

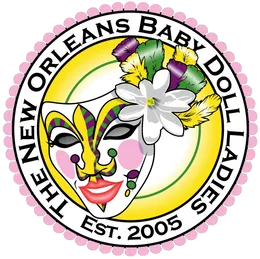

General information
- Name: New Orleans Baby Doll Ladies
- Year founded: 2005; 21 years ago
- Founder: Millisia White
- Principal venue: New Orleans, Louisiana
- Website: www.neworleanssocietyofdance.com

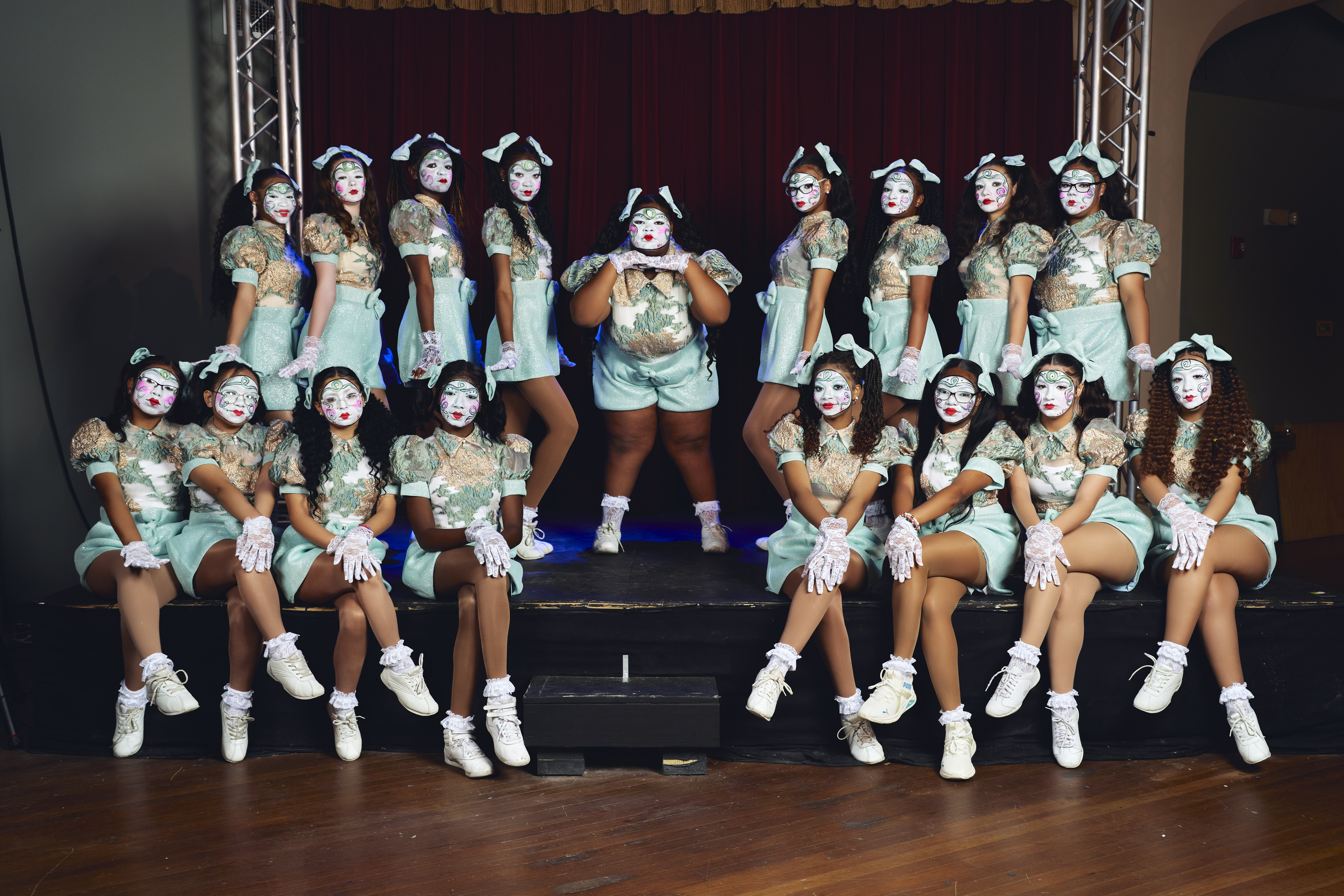
Junior Baby Doll Ladies

New Orleans Baby Doll Ladies is a dance group founded by Millisia White in 2005 when Hurricane Katrina hit the United States. The Congo Square stage at the New Orleans Jazz & Heritage Festival was the place where New Orleans Baby Doll Ladies made its first public appearance in 2009. The group’s “music ambassador” DJ Hektik scored custom tunes for this event. In 2010, group marched in its first parade on Mardi Gras. The group also performed in the 2014 Macy's Thanksgiving Day Parade in New York City. The group performs and co-ordinates outreach programs year-round. It is also associated with Carnival. The tradition of Baby Doll march started in 1912 by groups of women in New Orleans' red-light district, who marched in streets and dressed as dolls.

New Orleans Baby Doll Ladies group inducted 20 Juniors in Dance with The Dolls program. The juniors participated in The Krewe of New Orleans Baby Doll Ladies Mardi Gras Day Dance-Parade, with the theme "Essence of A Baby Doll".
