= Mistick Krewe of Comus =

New Orleans Mardi Gras Carnival krewe

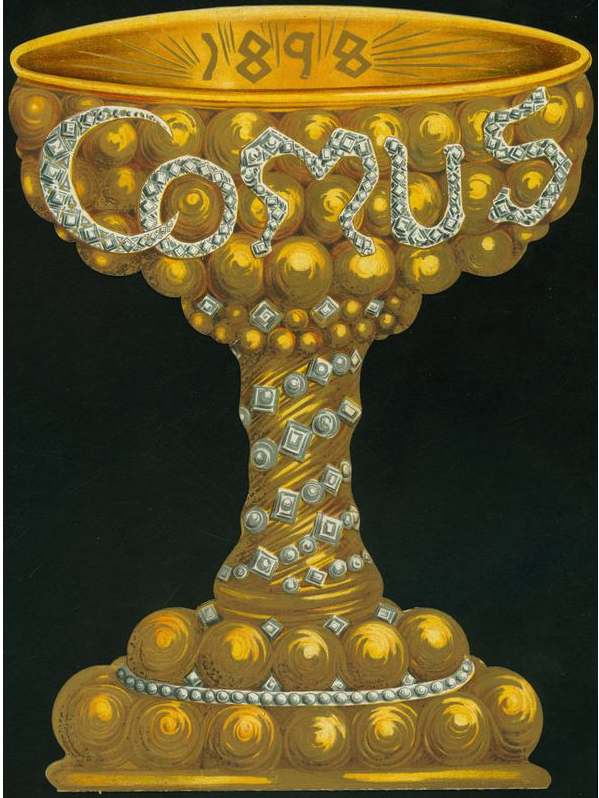
- Mistick Krewe of Comus 1898 Invitation
- Abbreviation: MKC
- Named after: Comus
- Formation: January 4, 1857; 169 years ago
- Founded at: New Orleans, Louisiana, U.S.
- Type: Carnival Krewe
- Location: New Orleans, Louisiana, U.S.

The Mistick Krewe of Comus (MKC), founded in 1856, is the oldest extant New Orleans, Louisiana Carnival Krewe, the longest to continually parade with few interruptions from 1856 to 1991, and continues to hold a tableau ball for its members and guests, to date. Initially its public facade was The Pickwick Club.

Before Comus was organized, Carnival celebrations in New Orleans were mostly confined to the Catholic Creole community. Parades were irregular and often very informal. Bernard de Marigny changed that in 1833 with the first formally organized New Orleans Carnival parade and tableau ball. It was Comus who in 1856, organized by 6 Protestant Anglo-Americans from the corresponding Uptown Neighborhoods (versus French Creole Vieux Carré), formalized the first continued observance of what we know today as New Orleans Mardi Gras or technically "Carnival" in New Orleans. French Catholics may have been invited thereafter, but the sharp racial, ethnic, and class divides in New Orleans make it unlikely until later.

In 1991, the New Orleans City Council passed an ordinance that required social organizations to certify publicly that they did not discriminate on the basis of race, religion, gender, disability, or sexual orientation, in order to obtain parade permits and other public licensure. The Comus organization (along with Momus and other 19th-century Krewes) withdrew from parading rather than racially integrating. Proteus is now the oldest continuous old line Krewe due to adopting the 1991 proposal and continuing.

== History and formation ==
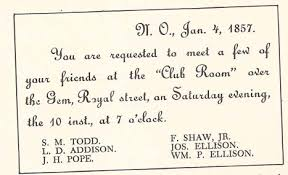
Mystick Krewe of Comus's initial invitation for members

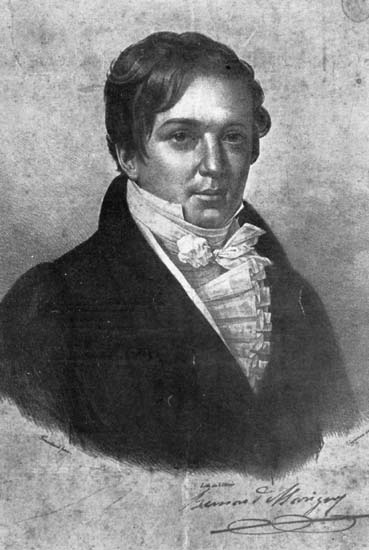
Bernard de Marigny de Mandeville

Building on the initial work of what French Creole American nobleman, and playboy, Bernard de Marigny had done in 1833, funding and organizing the first official Mardi Gras- a "parade" followed by a tableau ball celebration; in December 1856, six Anglo-American men of New Orleans gathered at Dr. John Pope's Drug Store on the Corner of Jackson and Prytania, a favorite rendezvous for the young men of the Fourth District, to begin to organize a secret society to observe Mardi Gras in a more formal and organized fashion than their Creole predecessors. These men invited their businessmen friends, a group of some thirty to forty people, to meet at a club room above the now-defunct Gem Restaurant/Saloon in New Orleans' Vieux Carré on Jan 4, 1857, to organize the Carnival society. The inspiration for the name came from John Milton's Lord of Misrule in his masque Comus. Part of the inspiration for the parade was a Mobile, Alabama, Carnival mystic society, with annual parades, called the Cowbellion de Rakin Society (from 1830),.

Founding members: Samuel Manning Todd, a drygoods merchant from Utica, New York, who arrived in New Orleans by way of Mobile, Alabama, like a few others. Frank Shaw, Jr., commission merchant from New York State; Lloyd Dulany Addison (son of Walter Dulany Addison, of the Oxon Hill Manor Addisons, members of the Tidewater gentry) born in Kentucky, partner Bullitt, Miller & Co. merchants and cotton factors; Dr. John H. Pope, credited with naming the group, from New York State originally, and Joseph Ellison, owned Pope, Ellison & Co., commission merchants-Pope was also a pharmacist owning Pope's Drugstore at the corner of Jackson and Prytania where this small coterie initially organized, he was born in Louisville, Kentucky; brother William Ellison, partner of firm Starke & Ellison, Cotton Brokers was born in Pittsburgh, Pennsylvania.

The new group acquired the costumes, floats, flambeaux, and even theme — their very name, Comus — from the 1856 Cowbellion parade (Milton's "Paradise Lost"). There are also indications that Striker's Independent Society from Mobile, Alabama, were involved, and they went en masse to the first Comus event.

One Mardi Gras historian describes The Mistick Krewe's creation in New Orleans thus:

It was Comus, who, in 1857, saved and transformed the dying flame of the old Creole Carnival with his enchanter's cup; it was Comus who introduced torch-lit processions and thematic floats to Mardi Gras; and it was Comus who ritually closed, and still closes, the most cherished festivities of New Orleans with splendor and pomp.

Comus' first night parade – replete with torches (which later came to be known as "flambeaux"), marching bands, and rolling floats – was wildly popular with Carnival revelers. So popular was the first Comus parade that the prospect of its second one attracted, for the first time, thousands of out-of-town visitors to New Orleans for the Carnival celebration.

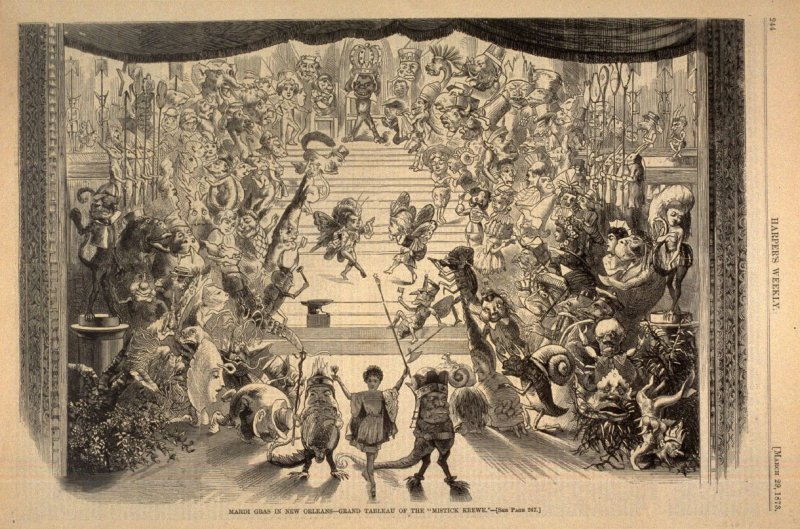
Grand Tableau of the Mistick Krewe - Harpers - New Orleans Mardi Gras 1873

Like that of other old established krewes, including Rex and Momus, Comus's history includes ties to white supremacy, particularly New Orleans's White League. Opposition to Reconstruction-era reforms prompted parade themes such as 1873's "The Missing Links to Darwin's Origin of Species" and 1877's "The Aryan Race".

== Parade ==
The Mistick Krewe presented a parade annually on the evening of Shrove Tuesday from 1857 to 1991 with some exceptions including during war. From 1885 to 1890 while the Mistick Krewe of Comus did not parade, the evening parade on Shrove Tuesday was the Krewe of Proteus. In 1890 Comus began parading again as the final parade on Mardi Gras with Proteus reverting to the evening of Lundi Gras.

=== Parade themes ===
- 1992 No Parade Planned theme: Enchantments and Metamorphoses
- 1991 Entomological Empire
- 1981 Idolatry
- 1979 No parade - New Orleans Police Department strike
- 1975 Comus' Constellations
- 1974 Visions of Valhalla
- 1973 Adventures of Perseus
- 1972 Fabled Isles (last parade to roll through the French Quarter)
- 1971 Feasts and Festivals
- 1970 Cities of Destiny
- 1969 Famous Gardens of the World
- 1968 History of New Orleans
- 1966 Monsters and Metamorphoses
- 1965 The Lure and Lore of Gold
- 1964 Journeys
- 1963 Mark Twain
- 1962 Nature: The Master Artist
- 1959 Poetry of the American Scene
- 1957 Famous Gardens of the World
- 1956 Early Contemporaries
- 1952 Bible Stories We All Know
- 1949 Familiar Facts and Fantasies
- 1941 No Parade - World War II
- 1940 Picturesque Passages from the Poets
- 1931 Jewels of Byron
- 1930 The Legend of Faust
- 1929 Gleanings of the Past
- 1928 The Travels of Marco Polo
- 1927 Arabesques
- 1926 The Gardens of Cashmere
- 1925 The Realms of Phantasy
- 1924 The Mirthful Monarch Greets Ye Once Again
- 1923 No Parade
- 1922 No Parade
- 1921 No Parade
- 1920 No Parade
- 1919 No Parade
- 1918 No Parade - World War I
- 1917 Romantic Legends
- 1916 Glimpses of the Modern World
- 1915 Lore and Legends of Childhood
- 1914 Tales from Chaucer
- 1913 Time's Mysteries
- 1912 Cathay
- 1911 Familiar Quotations
- 1910 Mahomet
- 1909 Flights of Fancy
- 1908 Gods and Goddesses
- 1907 Tennyson
- 1906 The Masque of Comus
- 1905 The Lost Pleiad
- 1904 Izdubar
- 1903 A Leaf from the Mahabarata
- 1902 The Fairy Kingdom
- 1901 Sections from the Operas
- 1900 Stories of the Golden Age
- 1899 Josephus
- 1898 Scenes from Shakespeare
- 1897 Homer's Odyssey
- 1896 The Months and Seasons
- 1895 The Songs of Long Ago
- 1894 Once Upon a Time
- 1893 Salambo
- 1892 Nippon, the Land of the Rising Sun
- 1891 Demonology
- 1890 The Plangenesis of the Mistick Krewe
- 1889 No Parade
- 1888 No Parade
- 1887 No Parade
- 1886 No Parade
- 1885 No Parade
- 1884 Illustrated Ireland
- 1883 No Parade
- 1882 The Worships of the World
- 1881 The Myths of Northland
- 1880 The Aztec People
- 1879 No Parade
- 1878 Scenes from the Metamorphoses of Ovid
- 1877 The Aryan Race
- 1876 Four Thousand Years of Sacred History
- 1875 No Parade
- 1874 The Visit of Envoys from the Old World and New to the Court of Comus
- 1873 The Missing Links to Darwin's Origin of Species
- 1872 Dreams of Homer
- 1871 Spenser's Faerie Queen
- 1870 The History of Louisiana from 1539 to 1815
- 1869 The Fives Senses
- 1868 The Departure of Lalla Rookh from Dehli
- 1867 The Triumph of Epicurus
- 1866 The Past, Present, and Future
- 1865 No Parade - American Civil War
- 1864 No Parade - American Civil War
- 1863 No Parade - American Civil War
- 1862 No Parade - American Civil War
- 1861 The Four Ages of Life
- 1860 Statues of the Great Men of Our Country
- 1859 The English Holidays
- 1858 The Classic Pantheon
- 1857 The Demon Actors in Milton's Paradise Lost

== Gallery ==
=== Costumes and floats ===
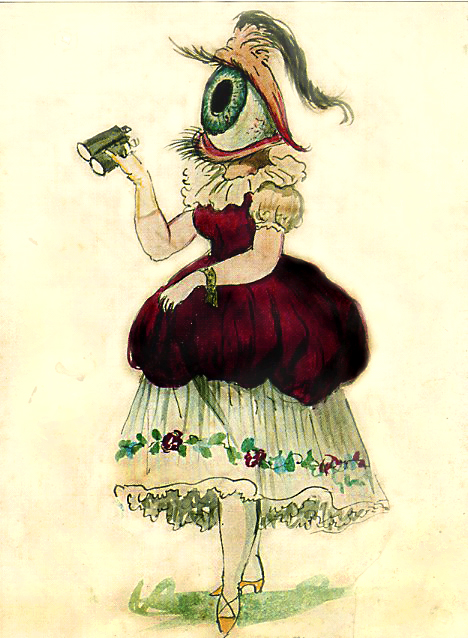
Female Eye 1869

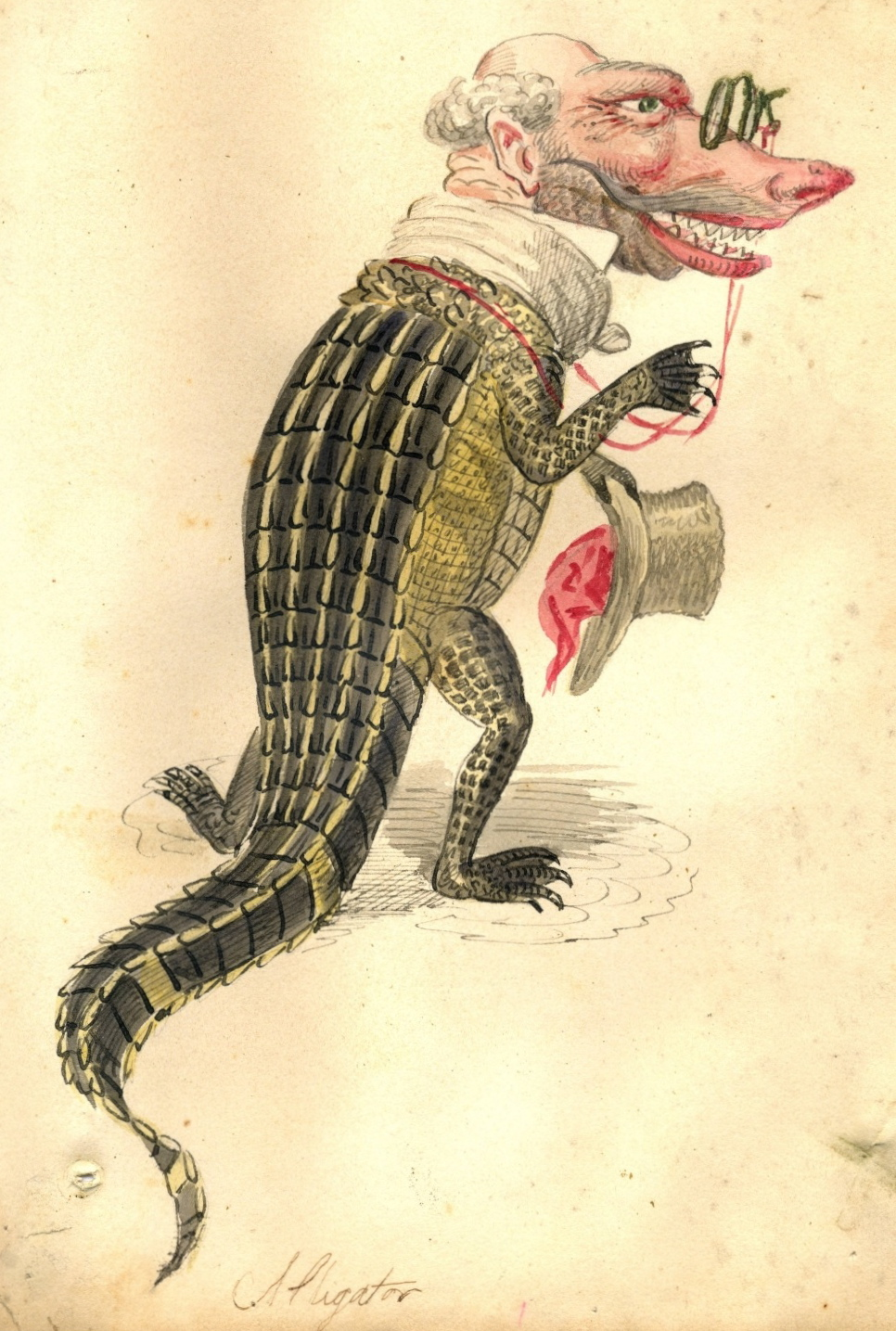
Alligator 1873

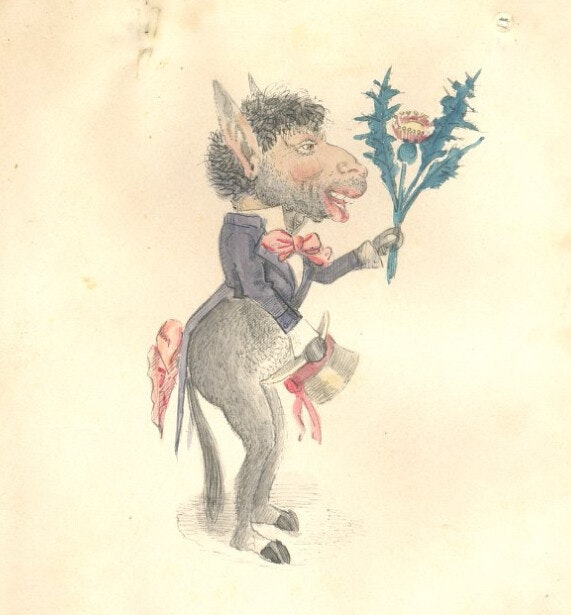
Ass Costume Parade 1873

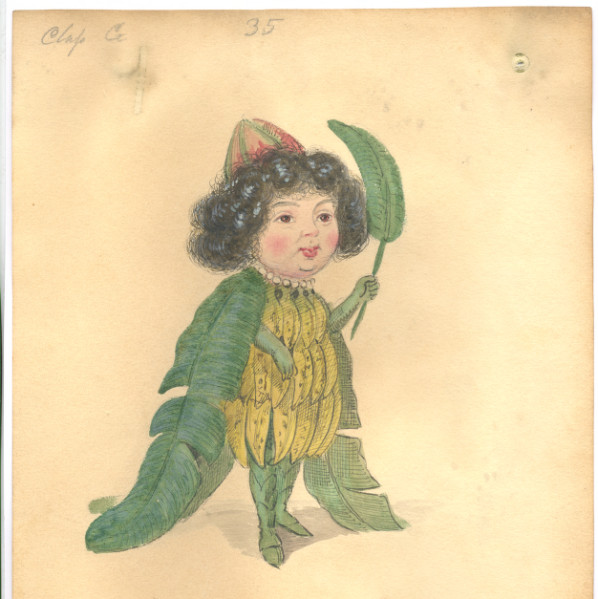
Bananas 1873

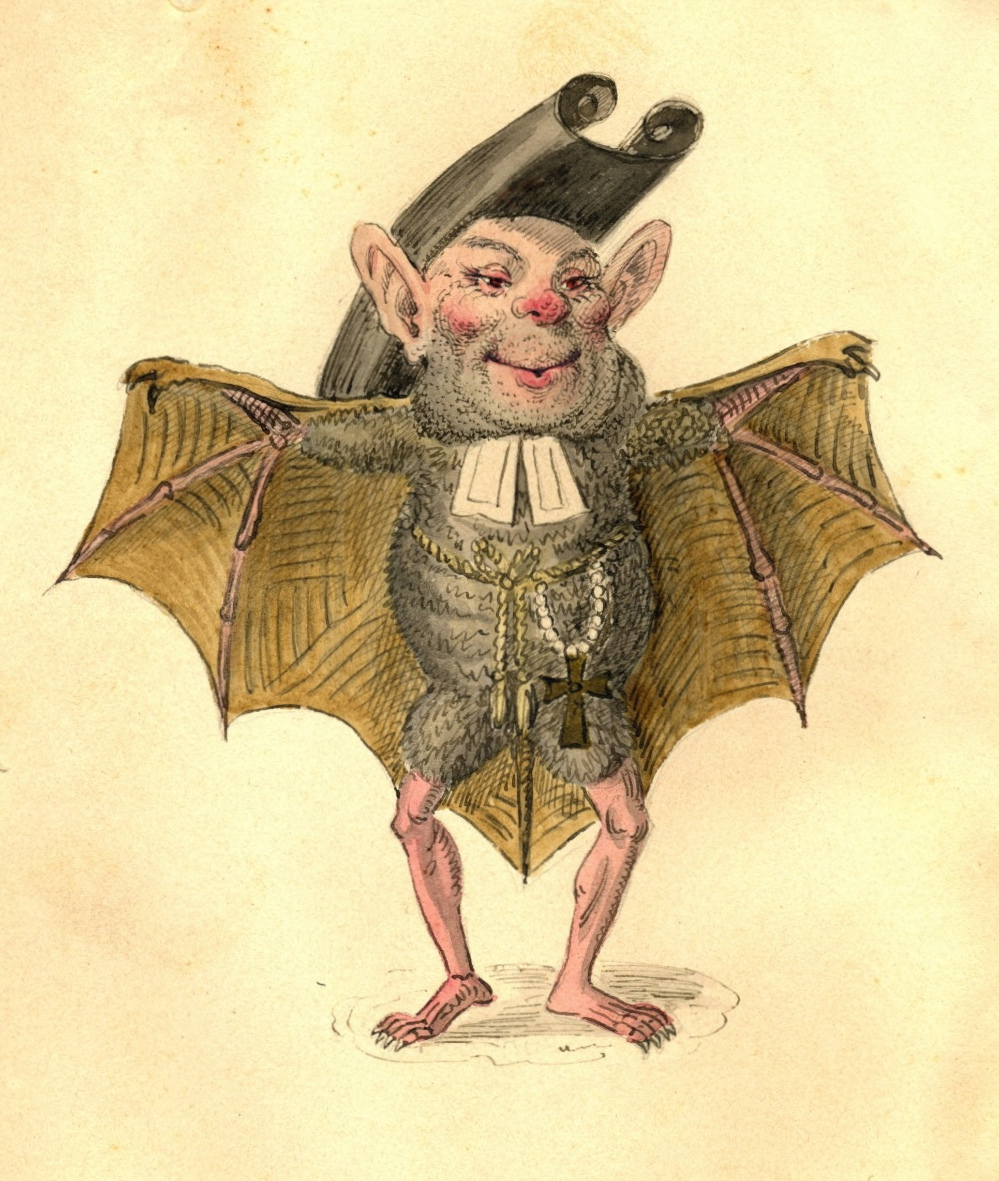
Bat 1873

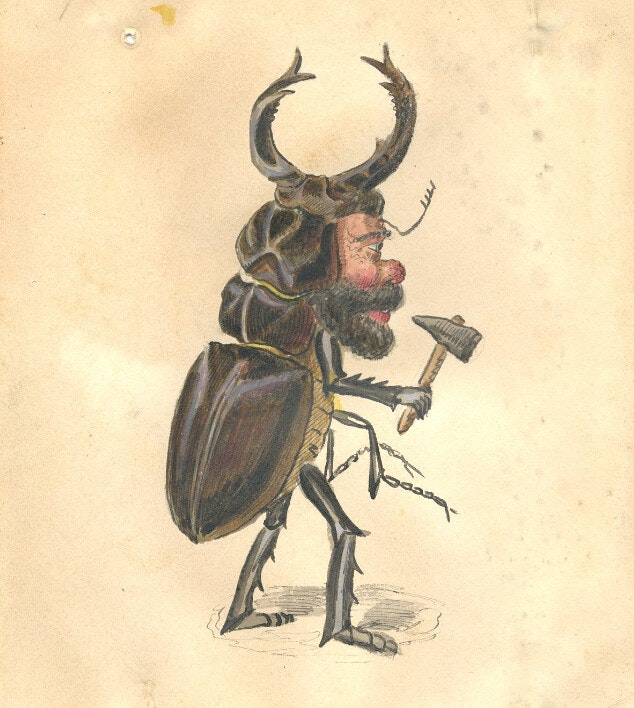
Beetle 1873

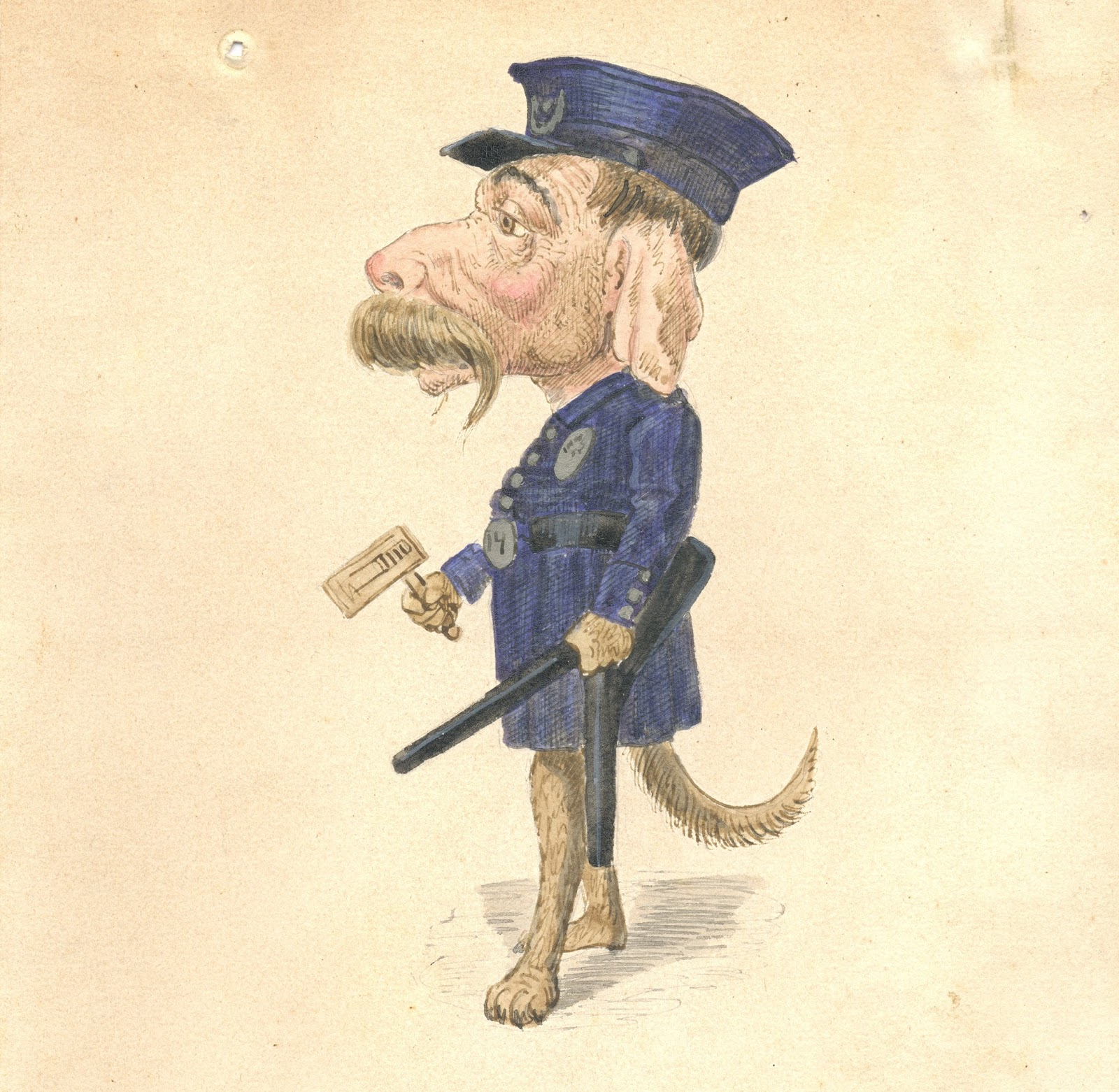
Bloodhound 1873

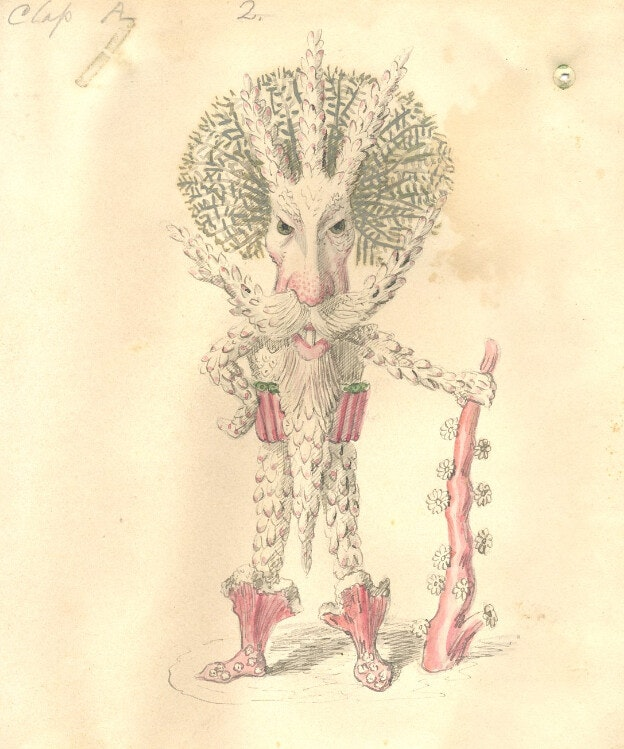
Coral Polyp 1873

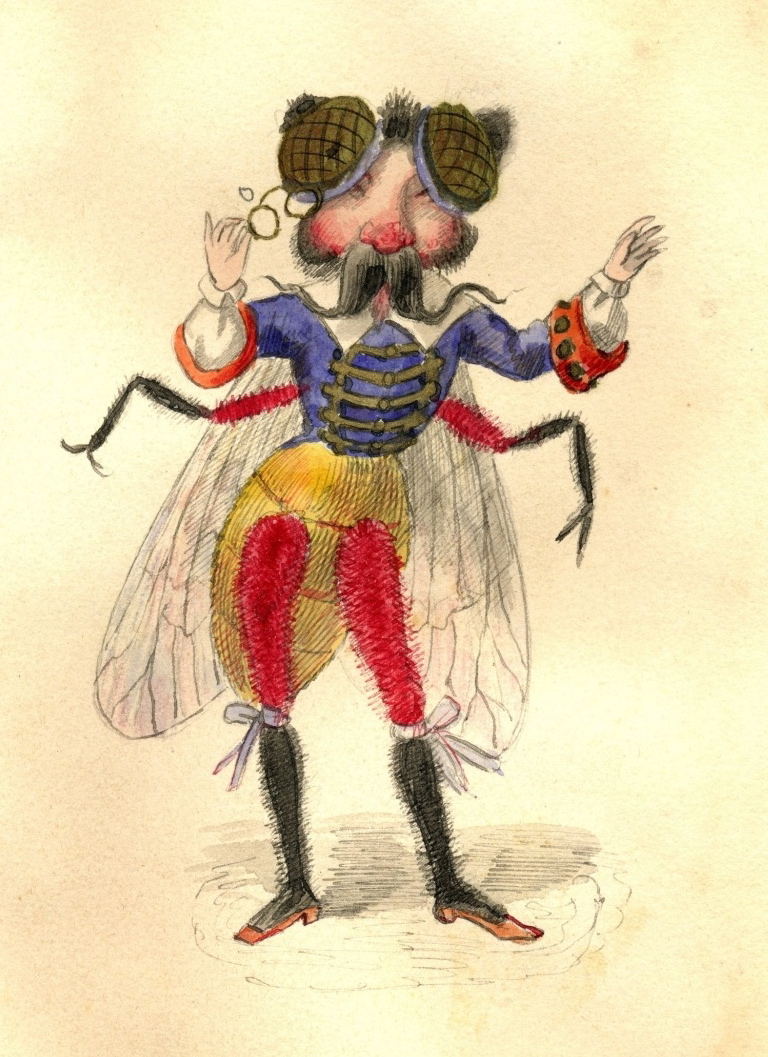
Fly 1873

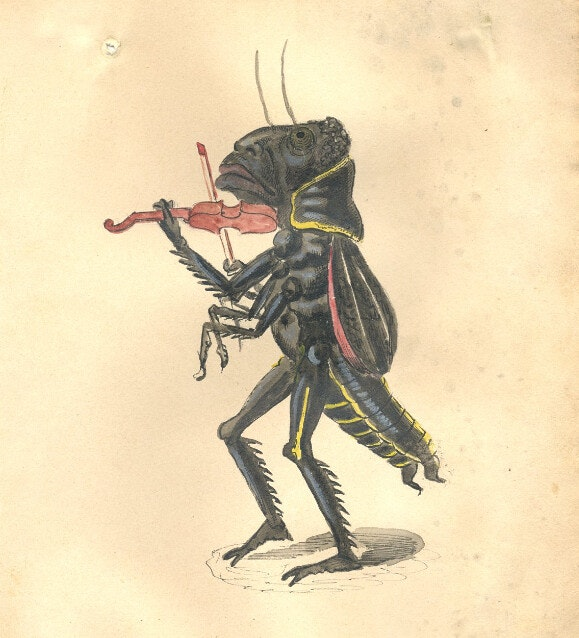
Grasshopper 1873

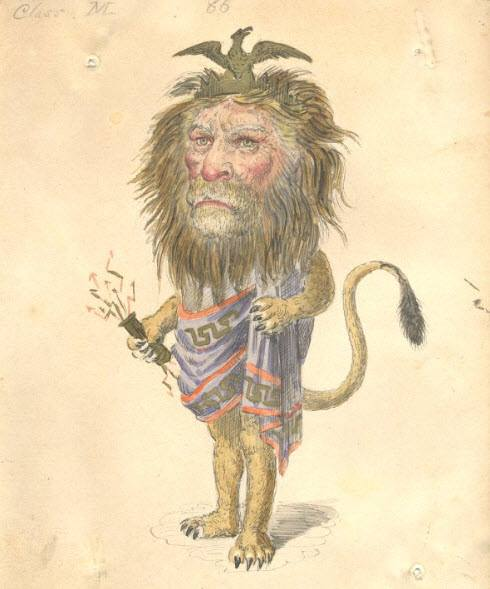
Lion 1873

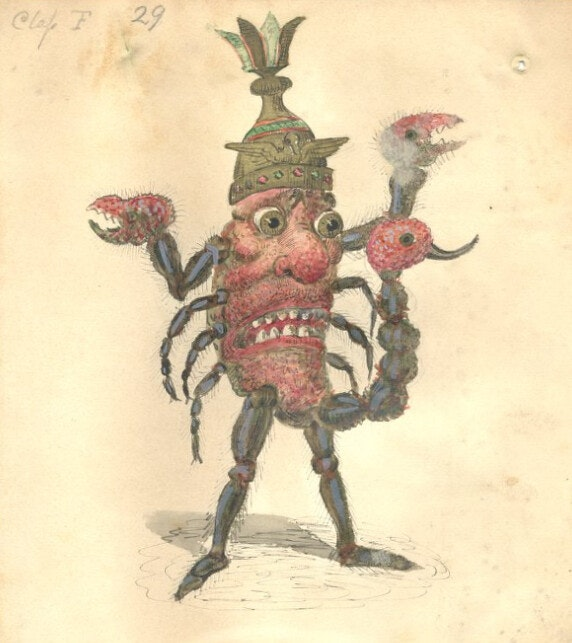
Scorpion 1873

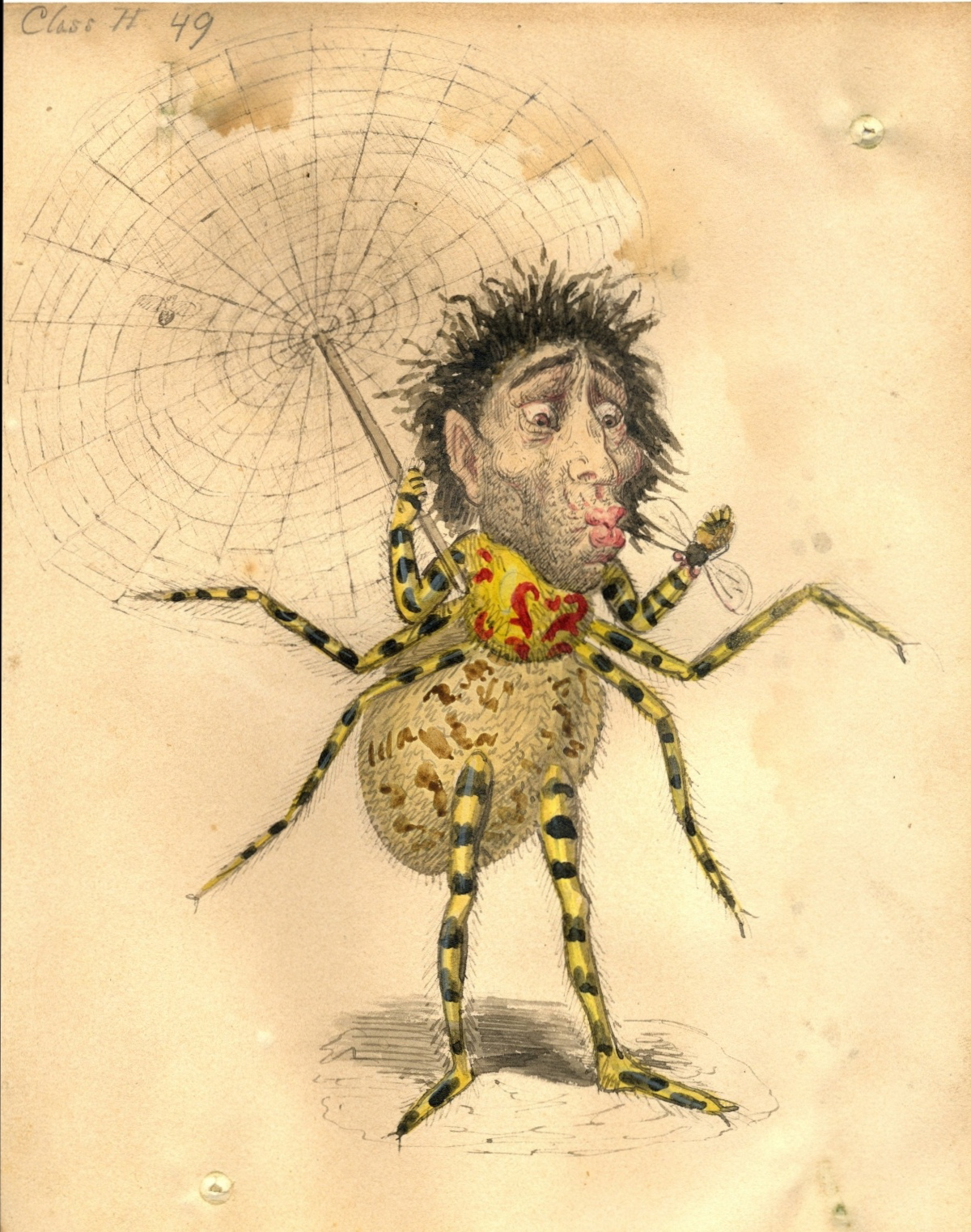
Spider 1873

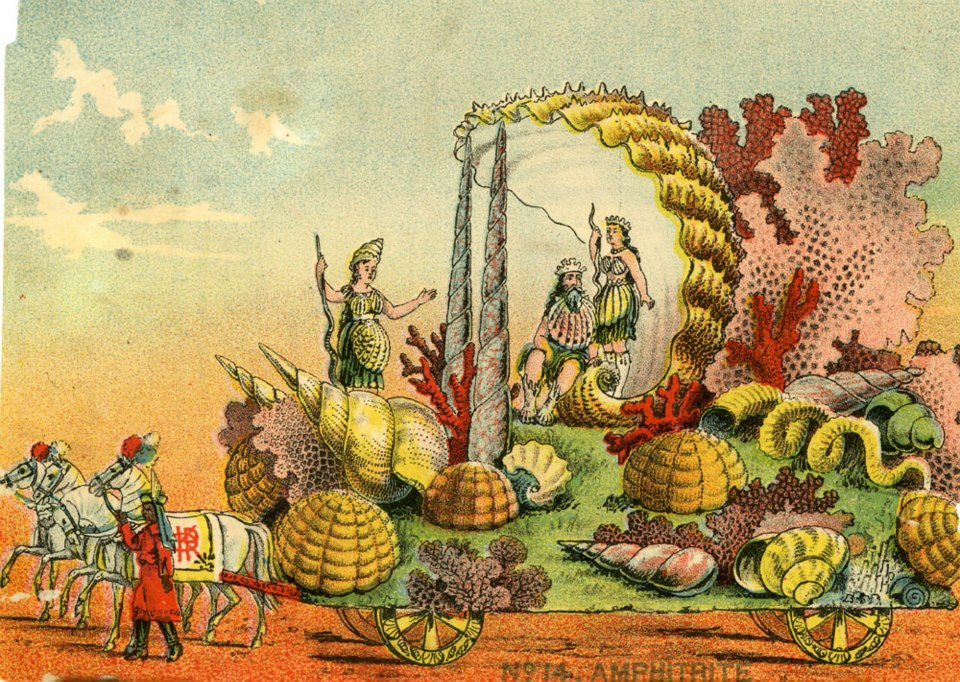
Amphitrite 1886

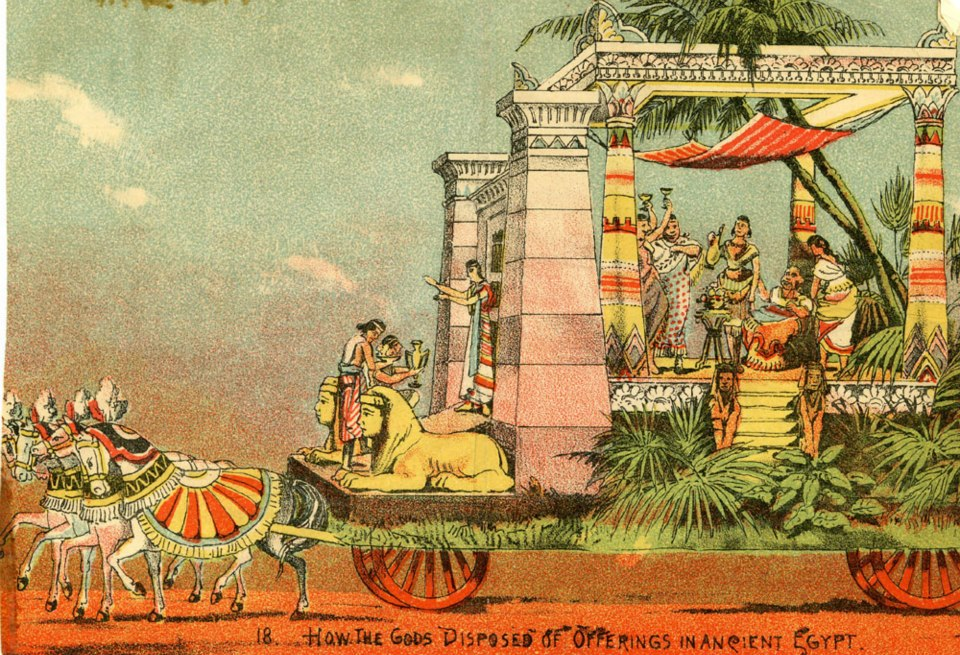
Offerings in Ancient Egypt 1886

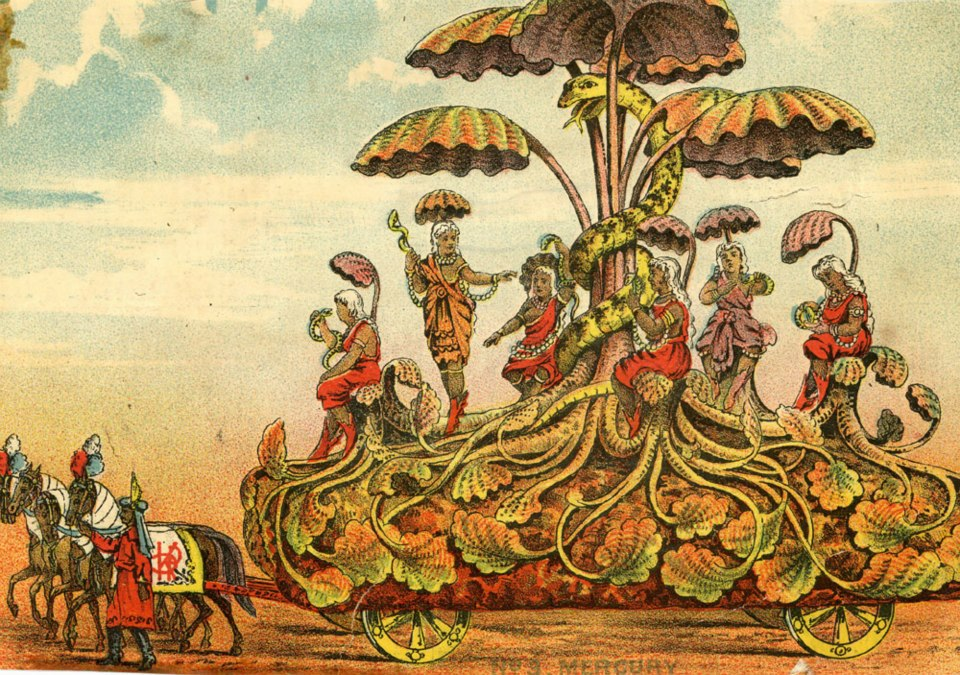
Mercury 1886

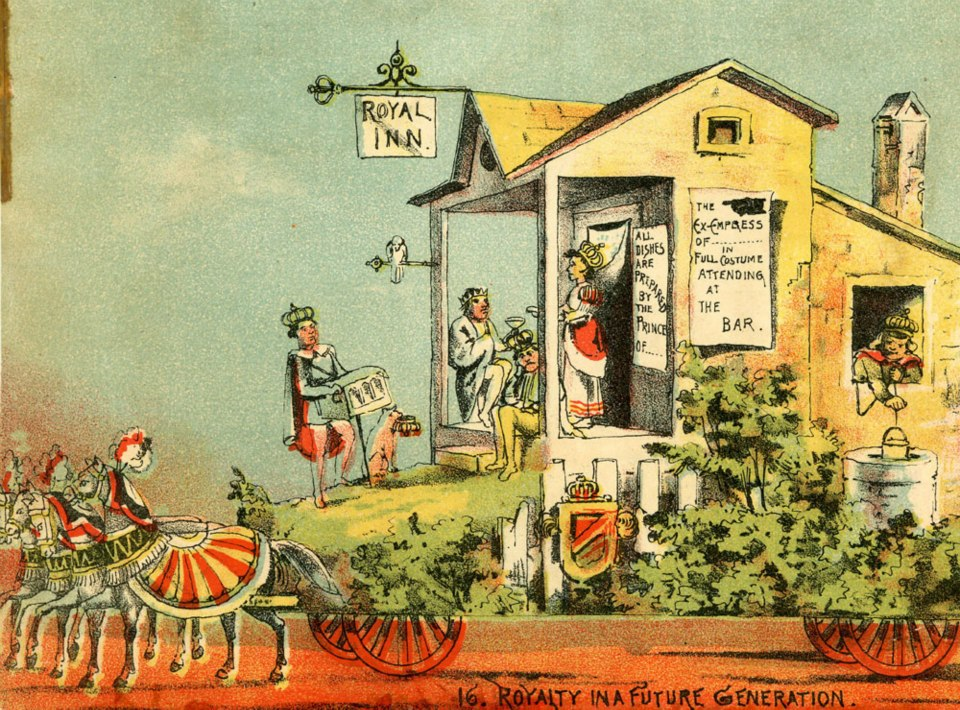
Royalty in a Future Generation 1886

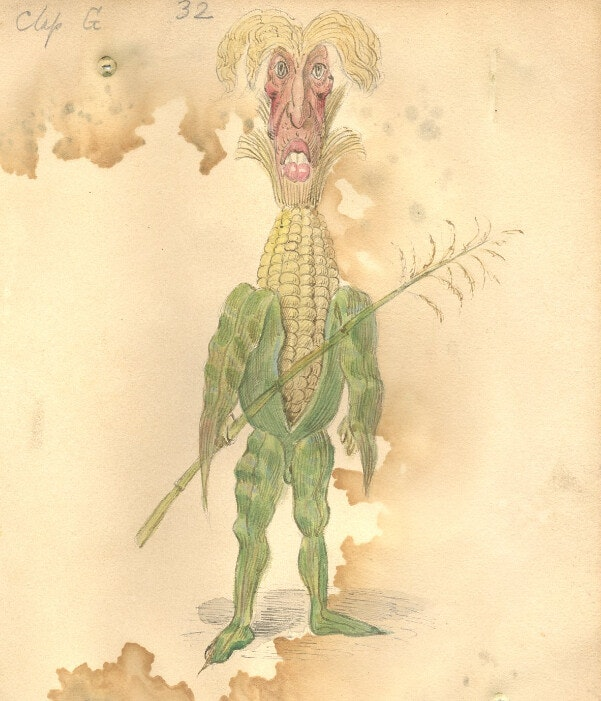
Corn Costume 1893

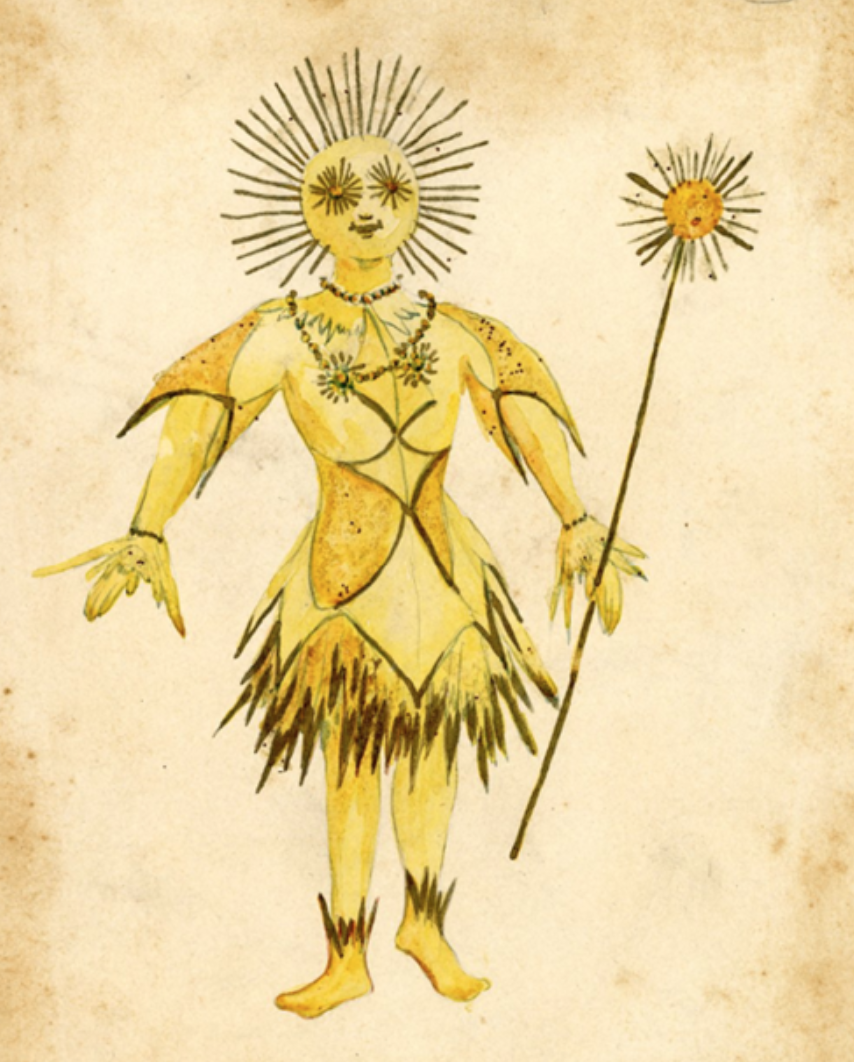
1894

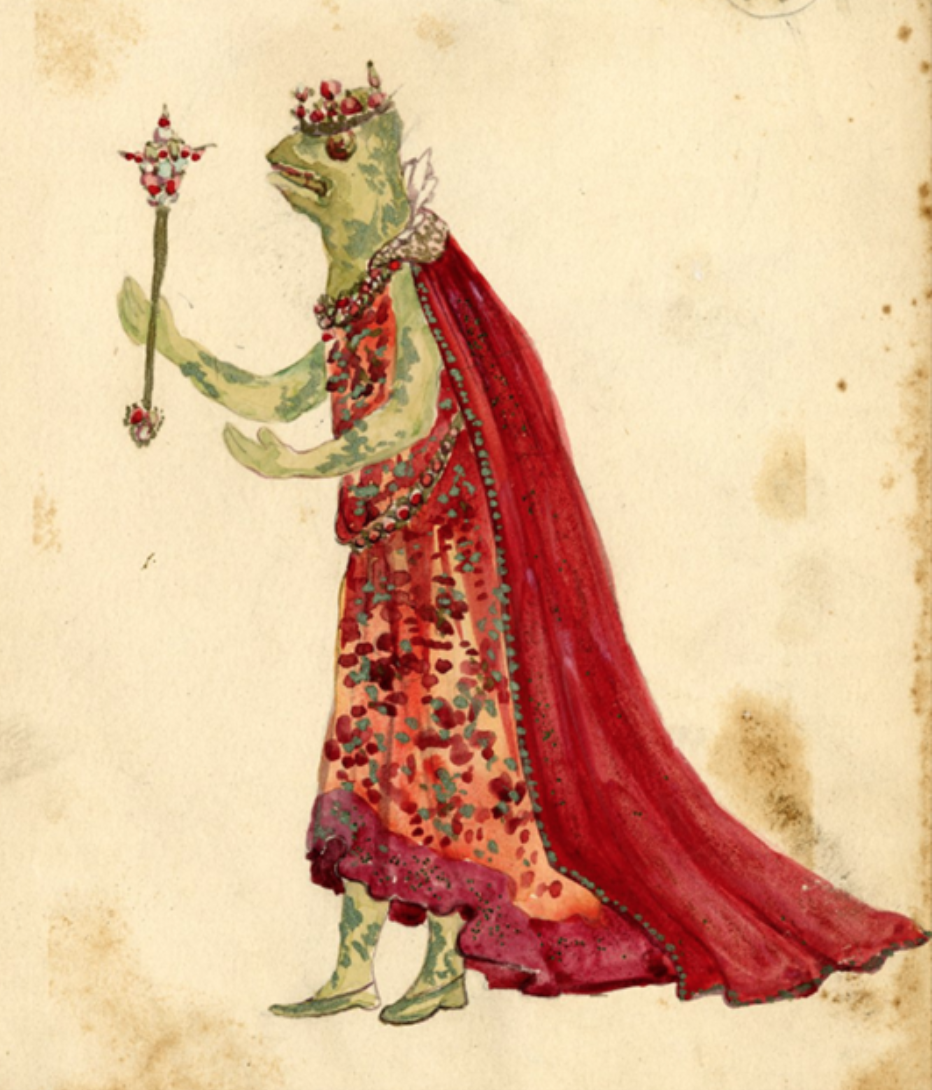
1894

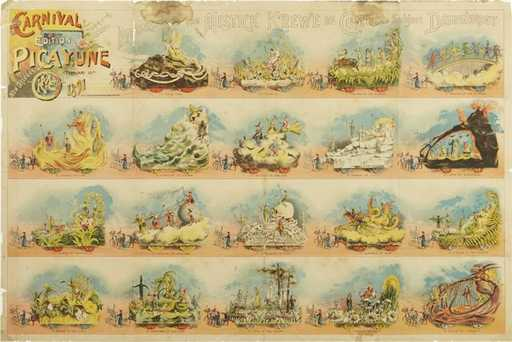
1897 Bulletin

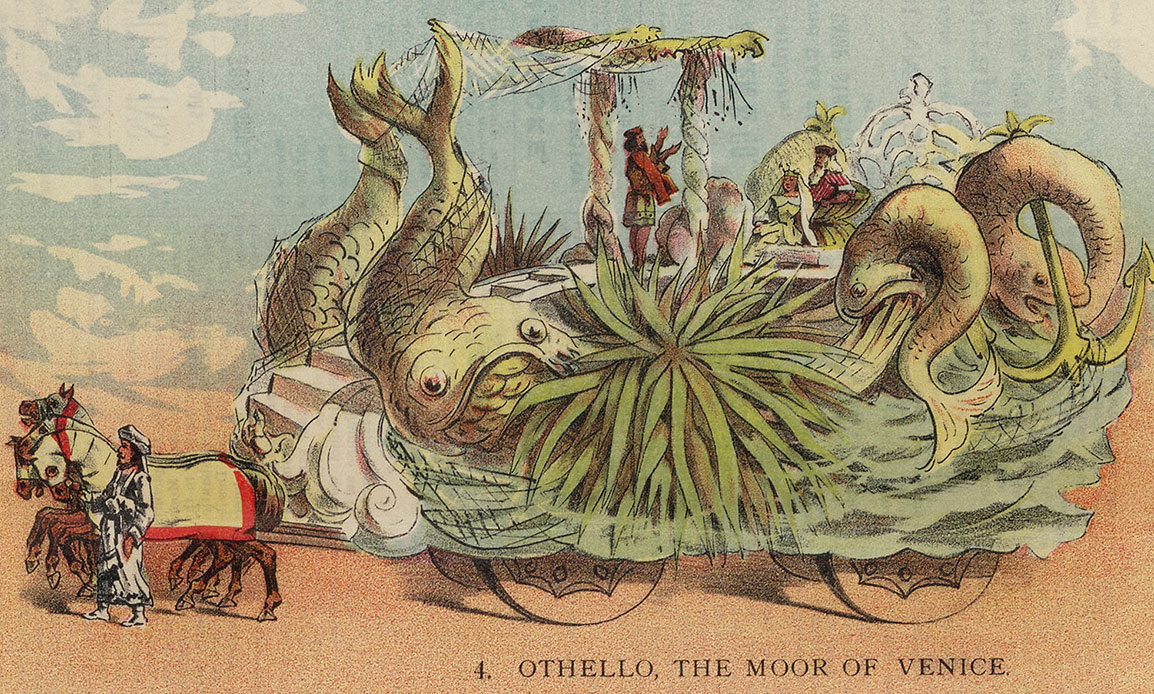
Othello 1898

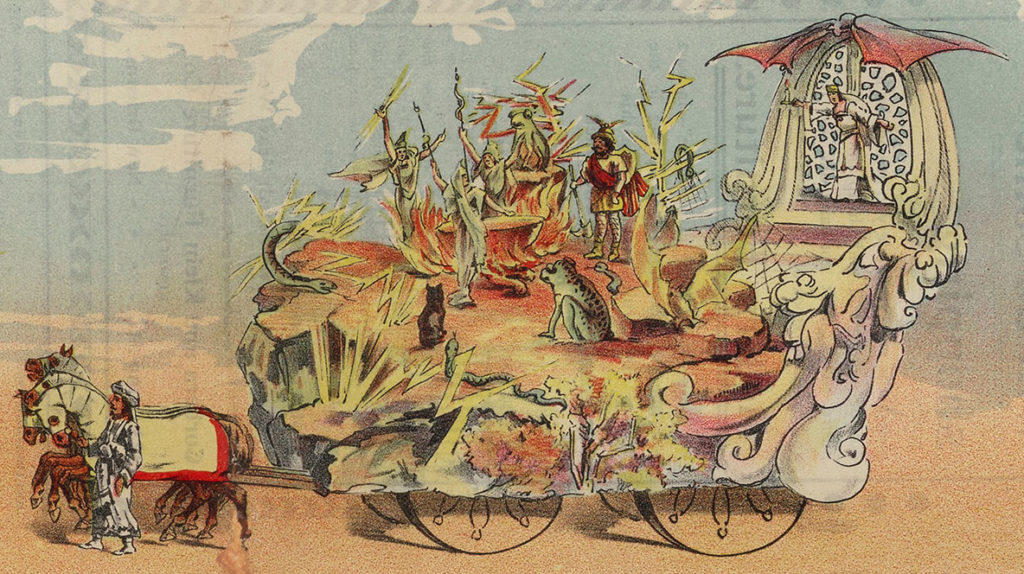
Macbeth 1989

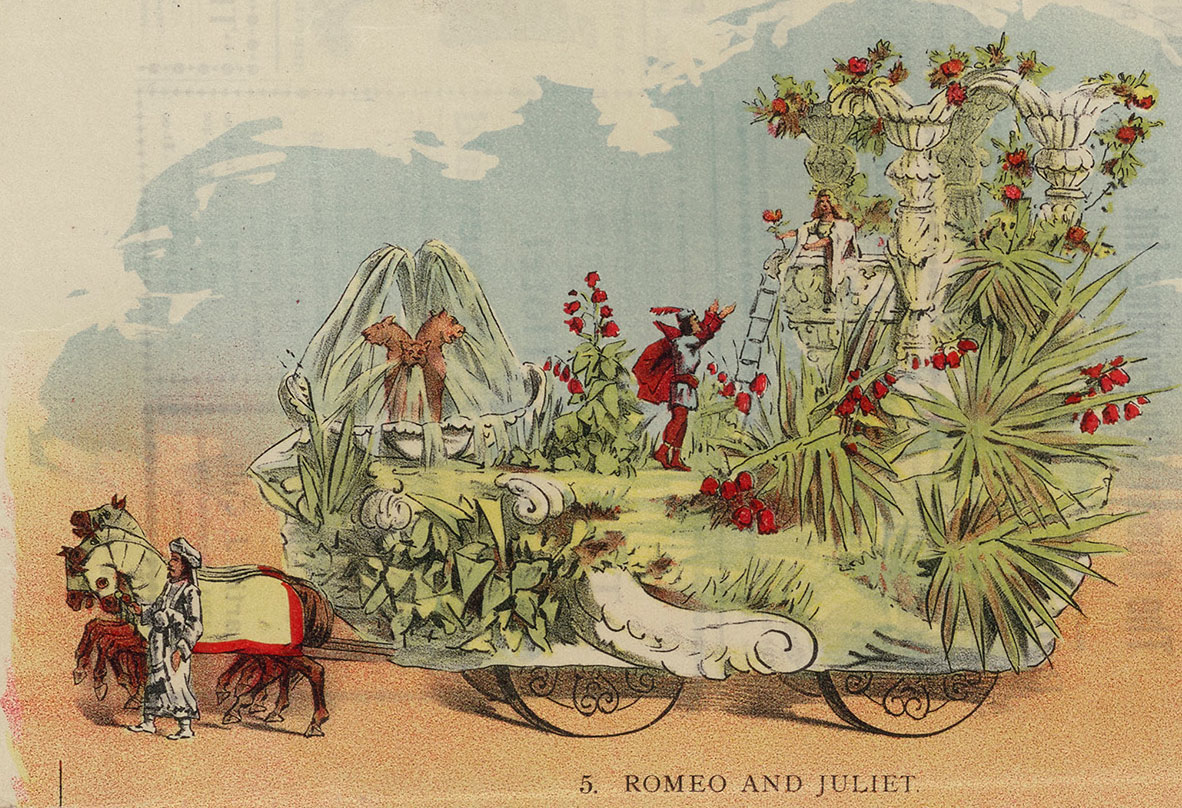
Romeo and Juliet 1898

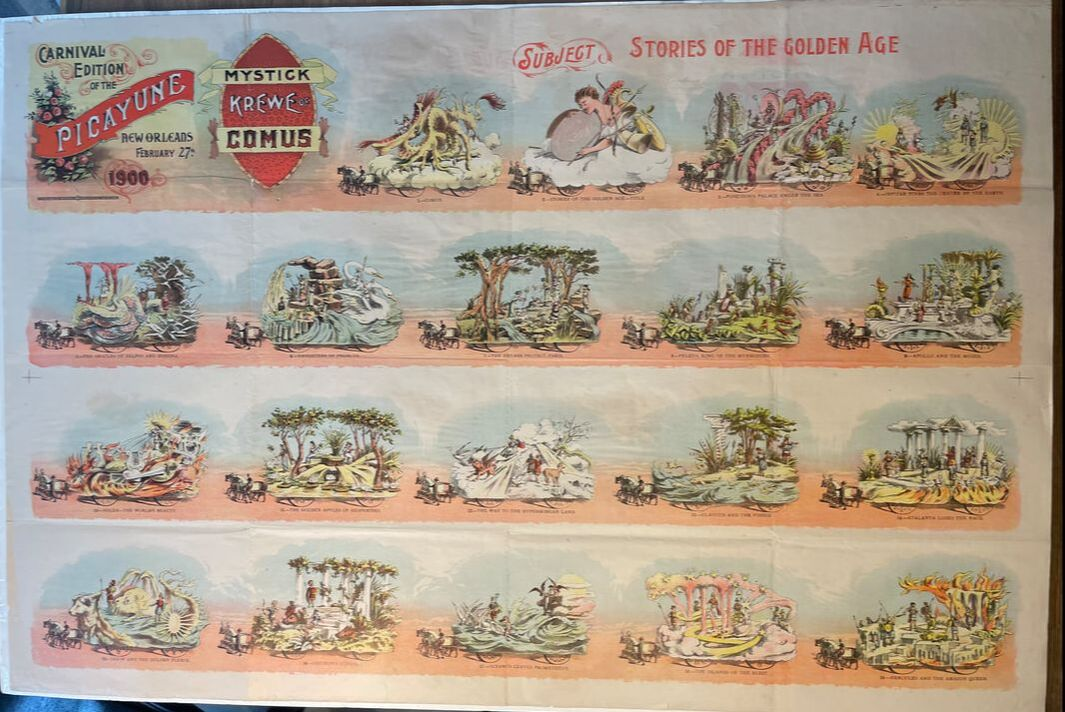
Bulletin Stories of the Golden Age 1900

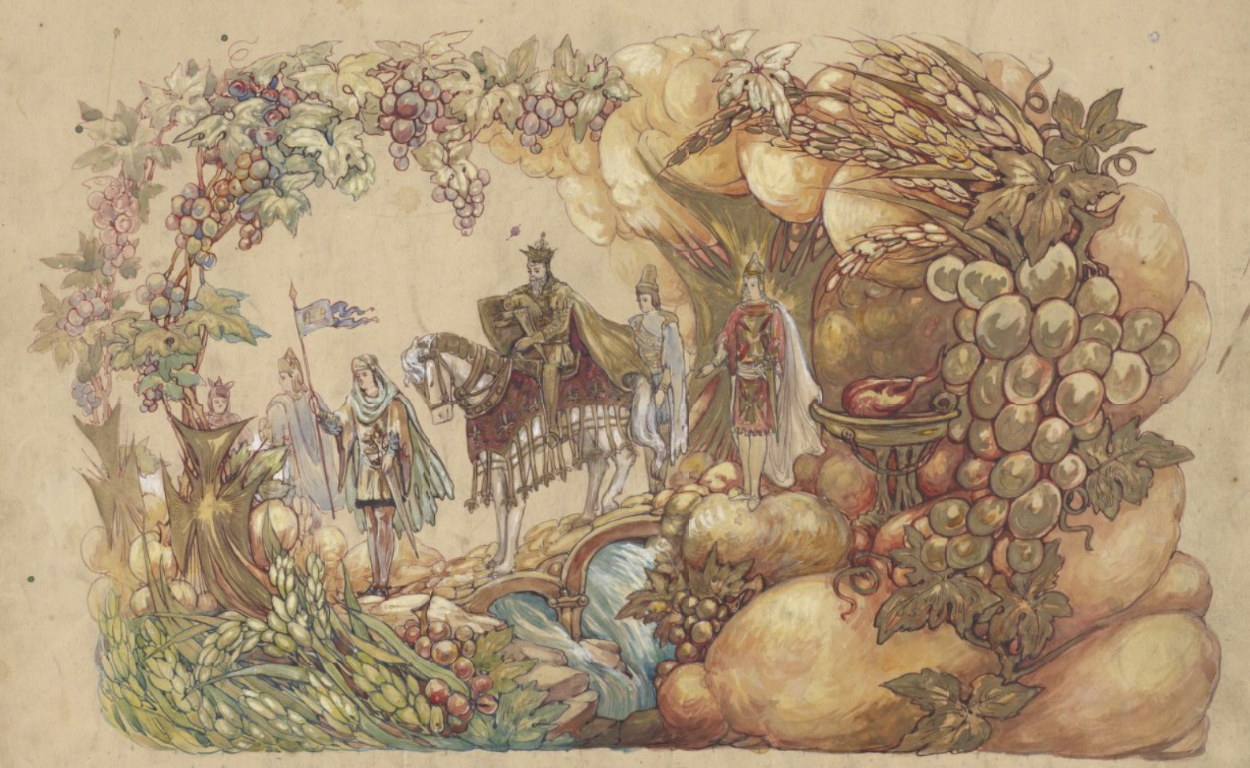
Charlemagne 1909

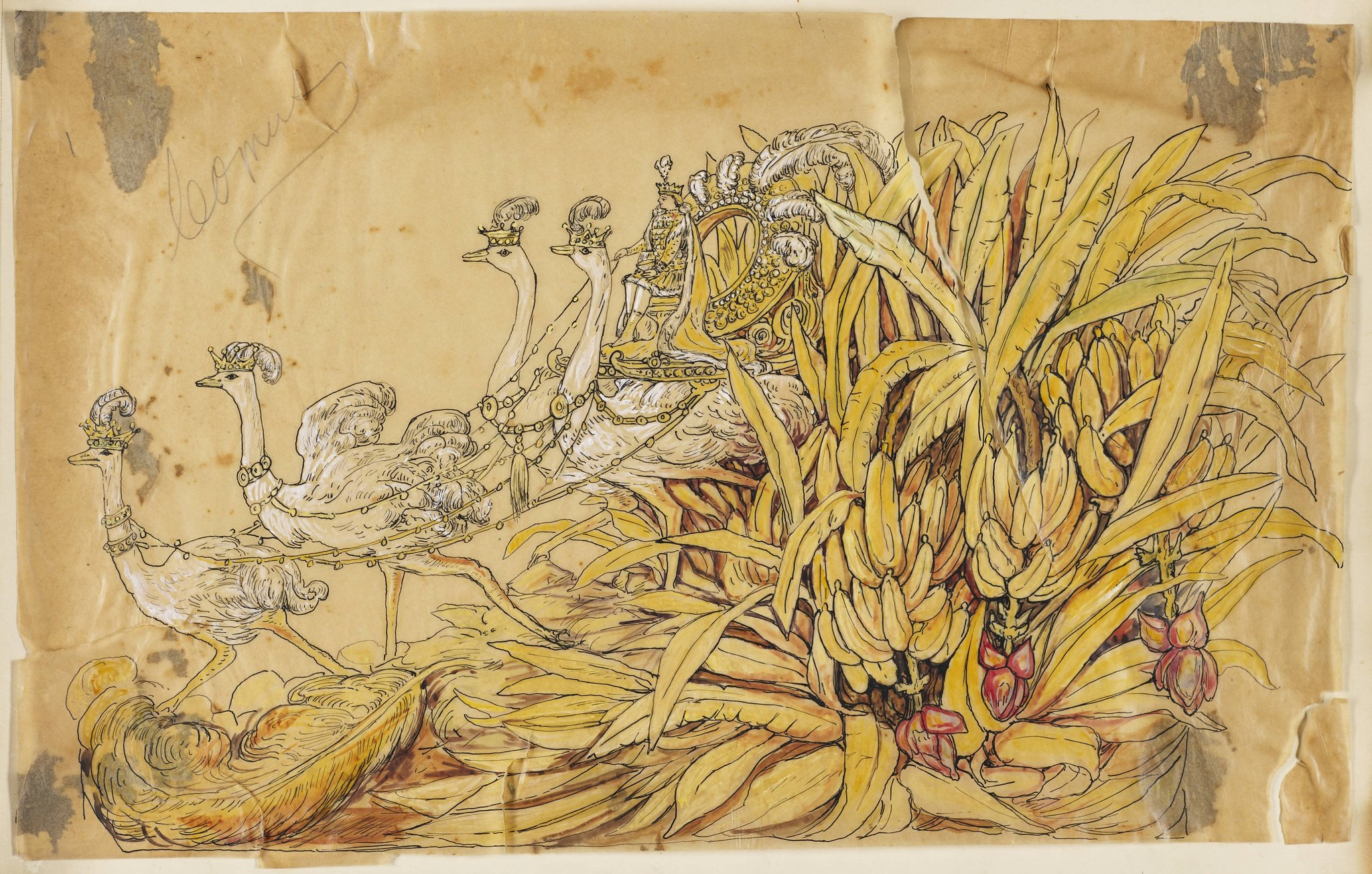
COMUS 1910

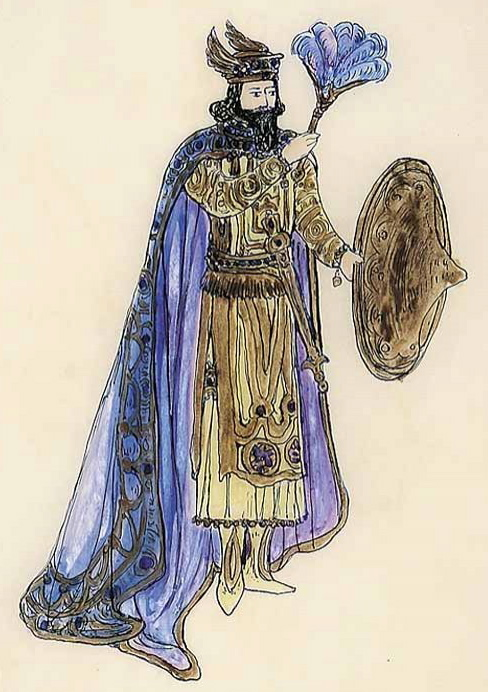
1910

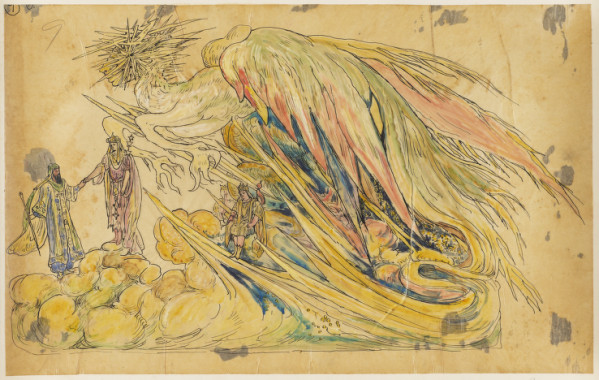
Al Borak 1910

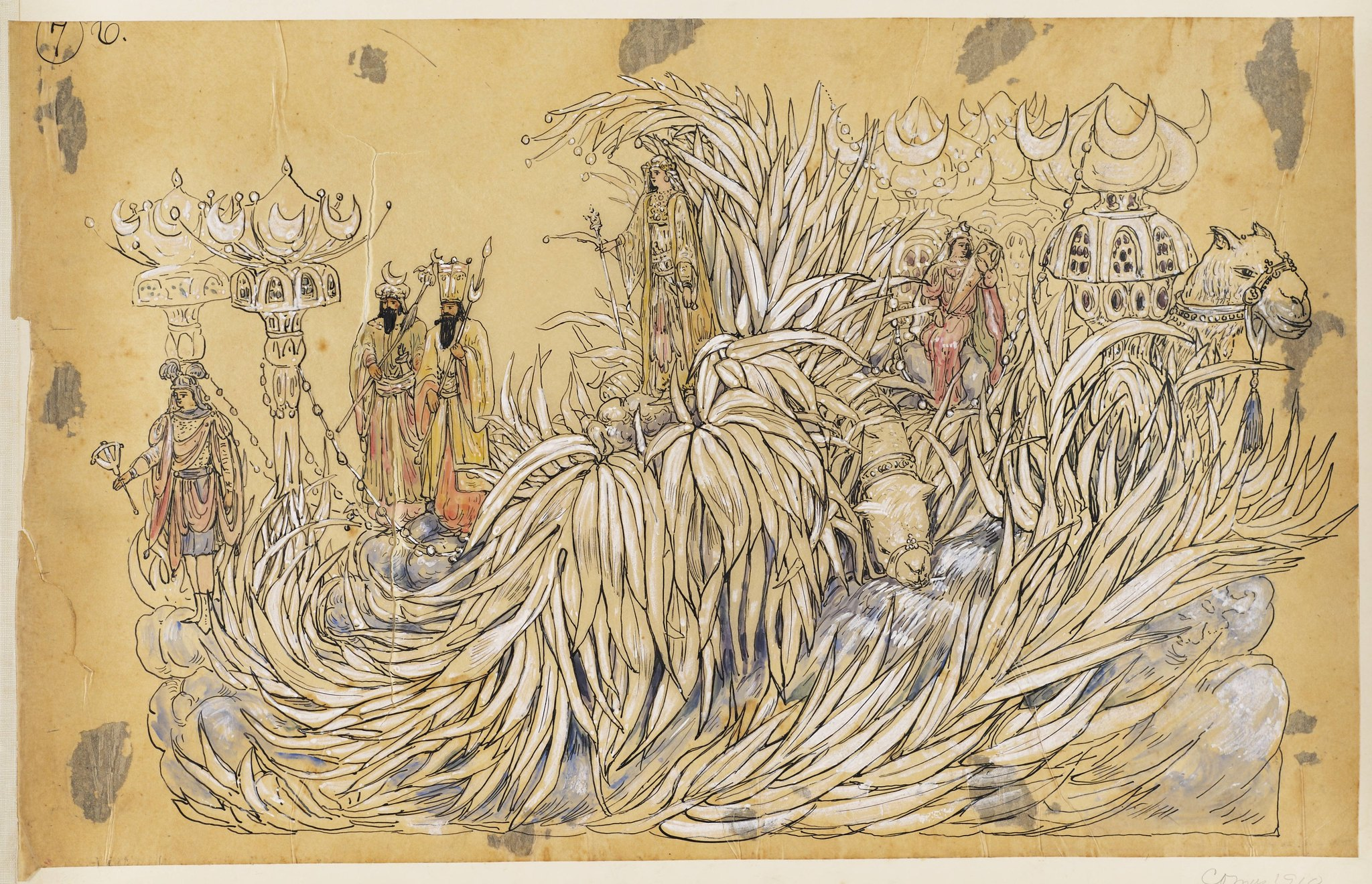
Cadijah 1910

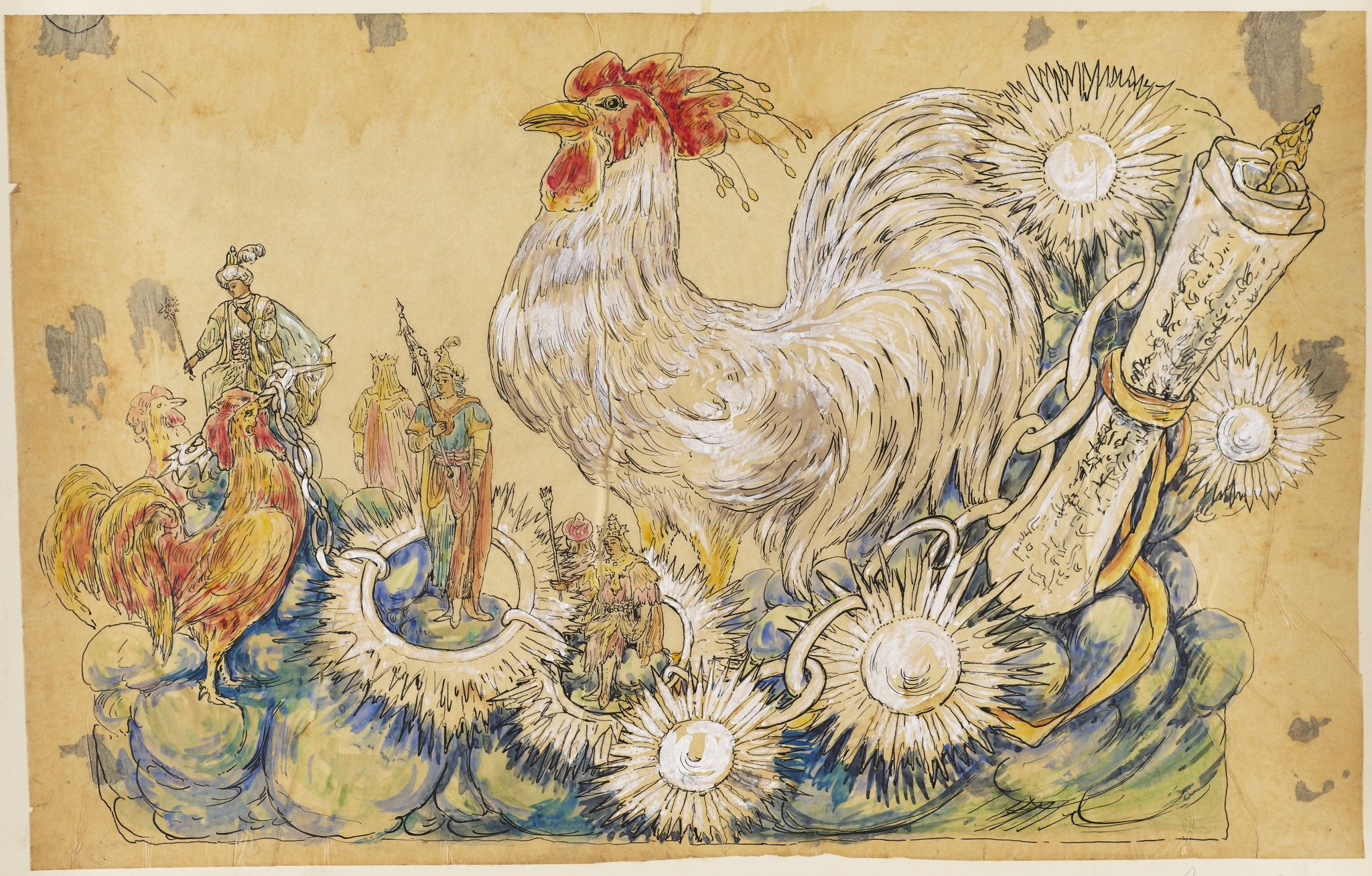
Cockerel 1910

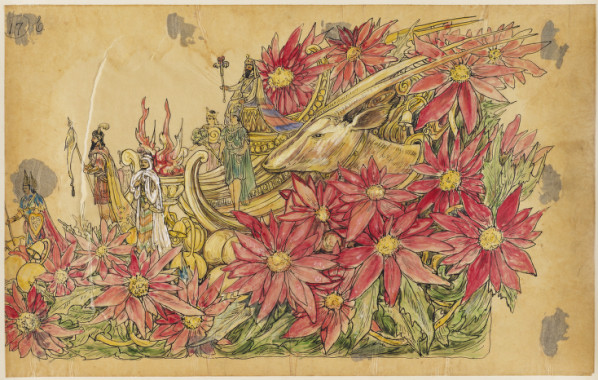
King of Abyssinia 1910

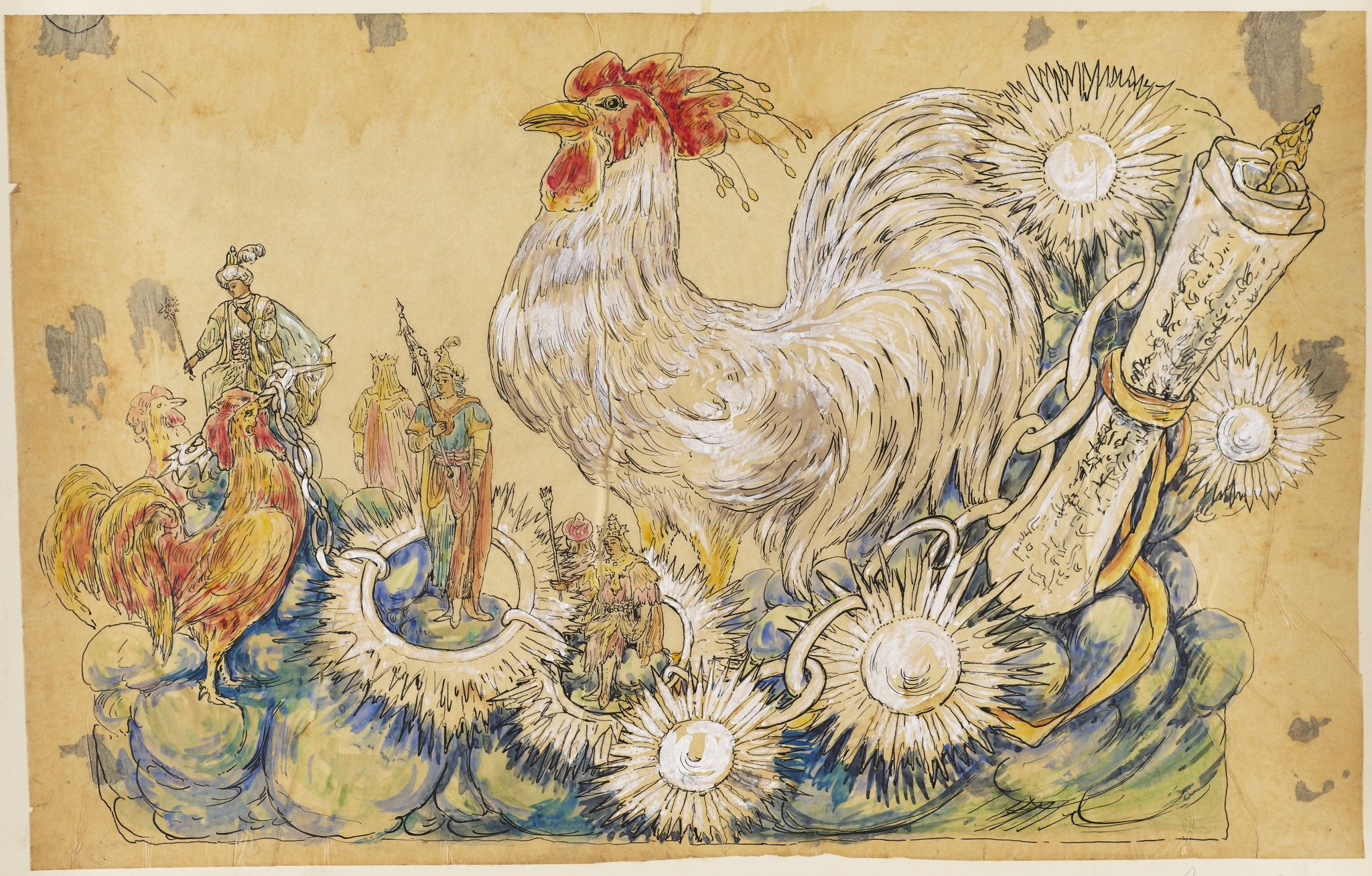
The Cock 1910

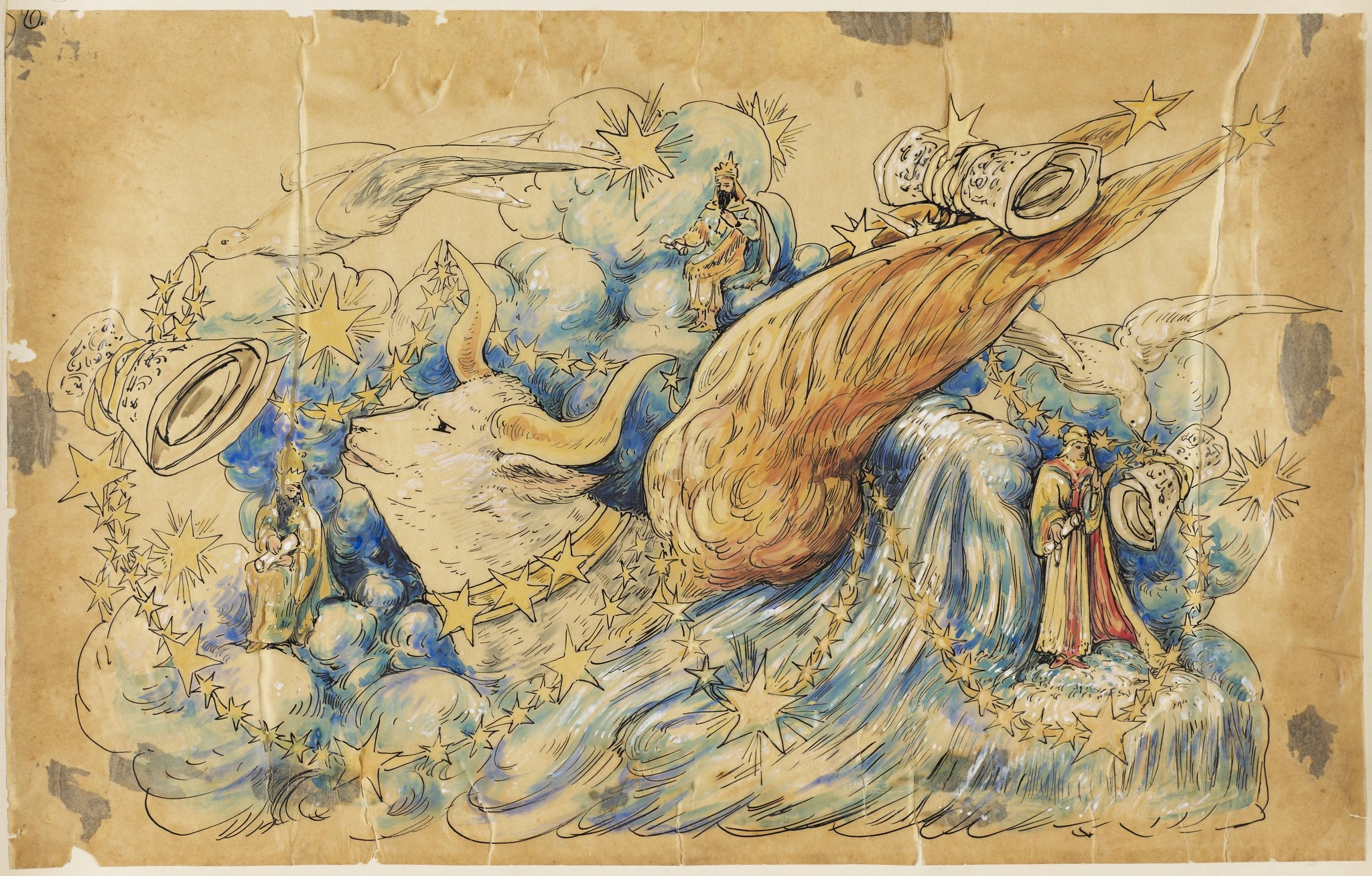
The Koran 1910

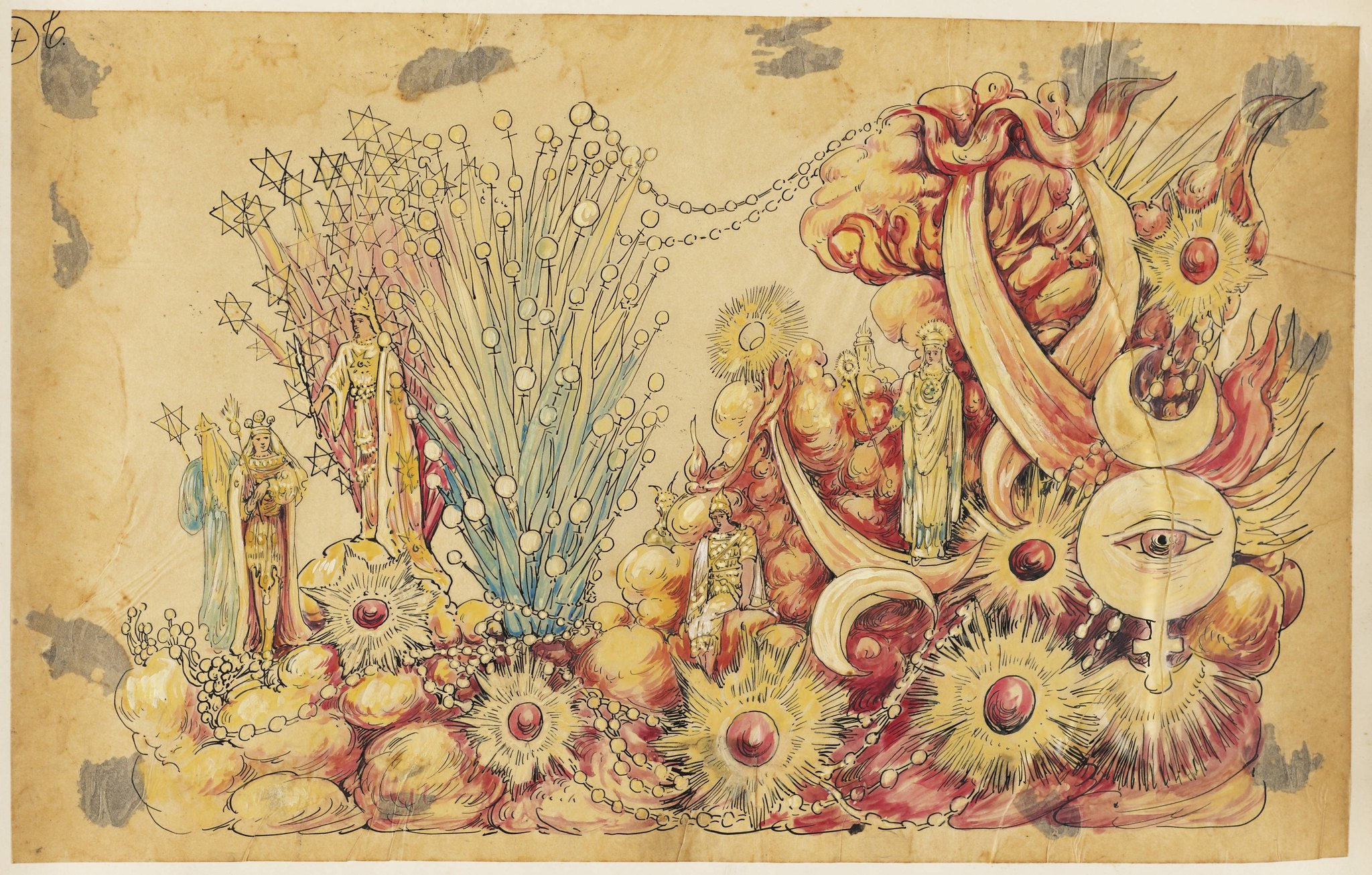
The Mystic Shrine 1910

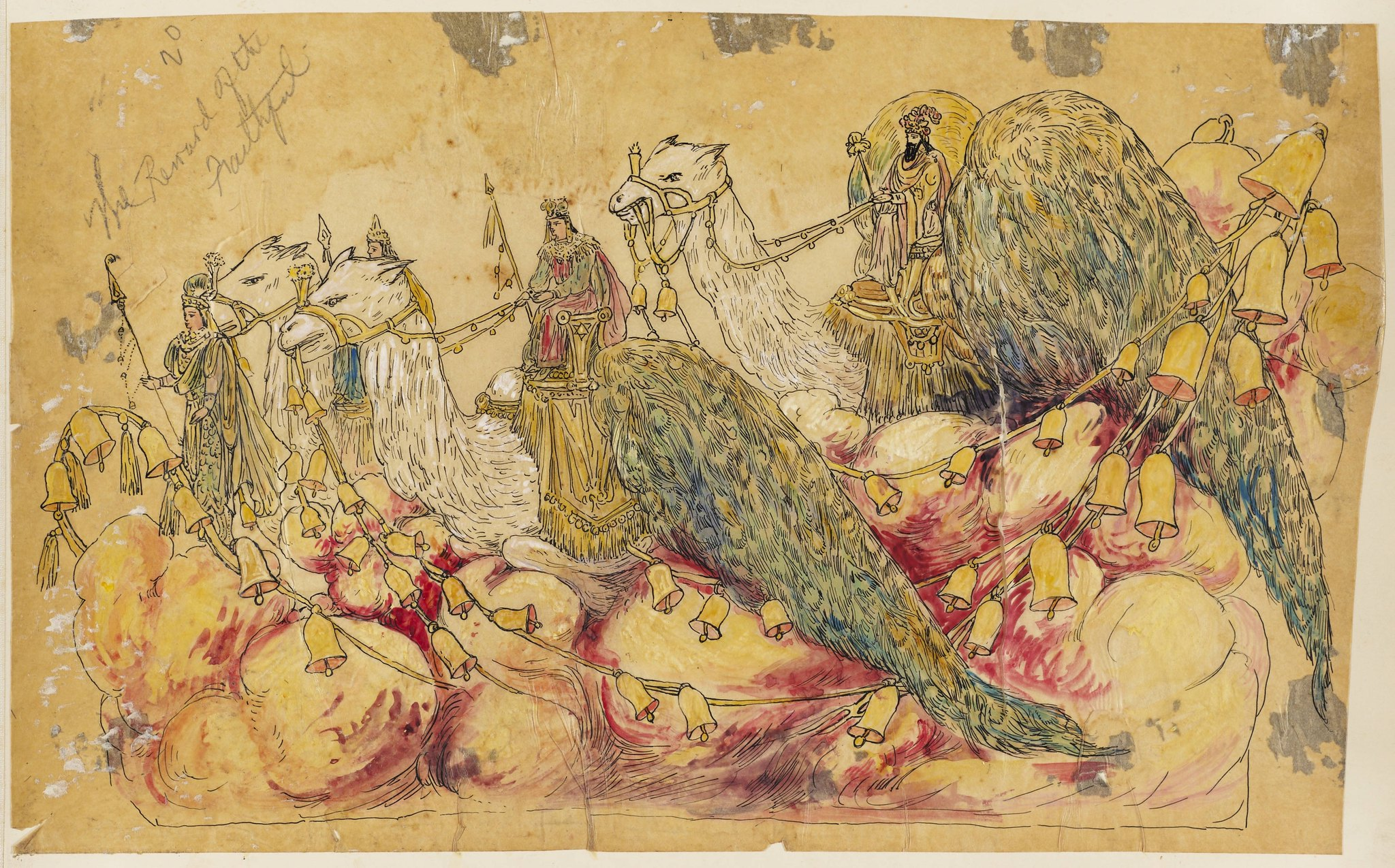
The Reward of the Faithful 1910

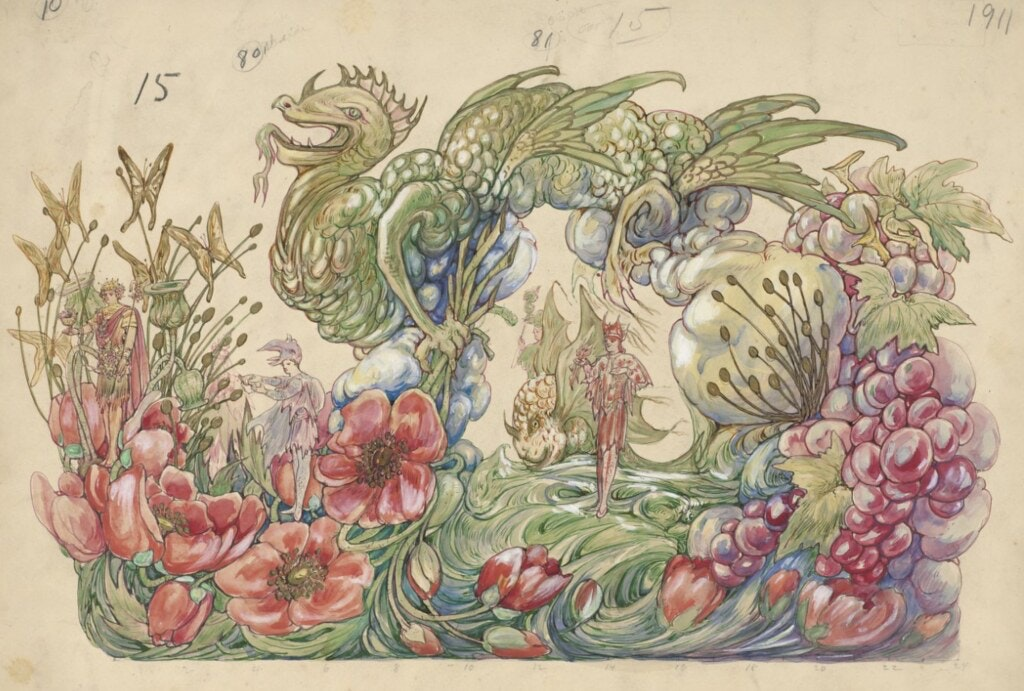
Such Stuff as Dreams are Made Of 1911

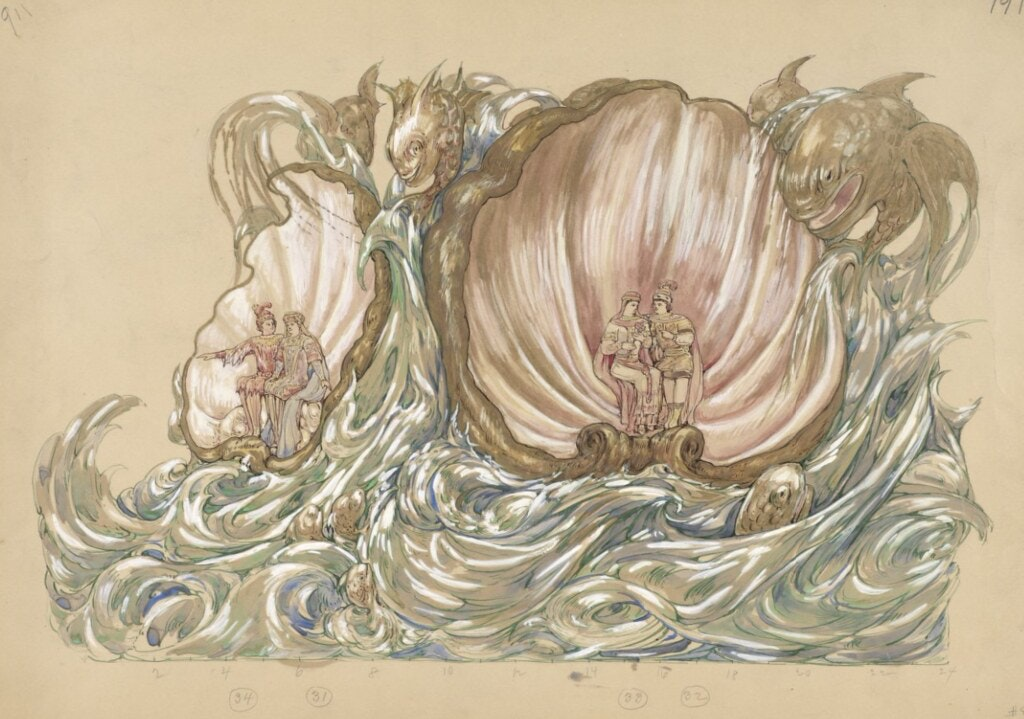
What Are The Wild Waves Saying 1911

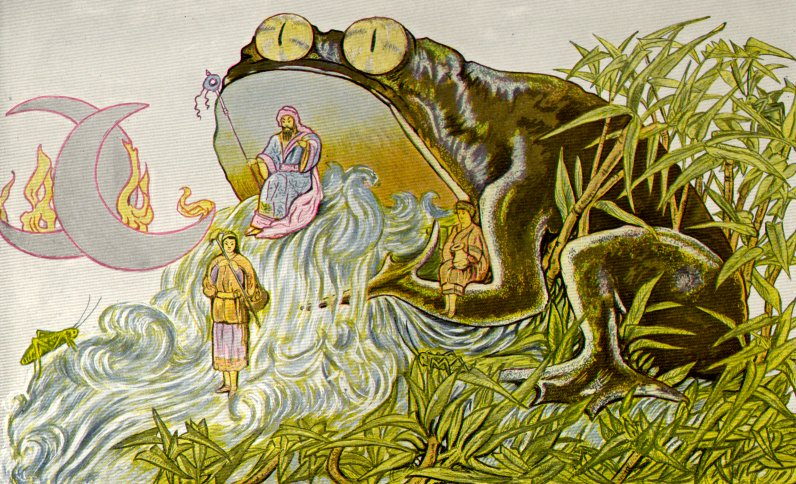
Frog 1912

=== Invitations ===
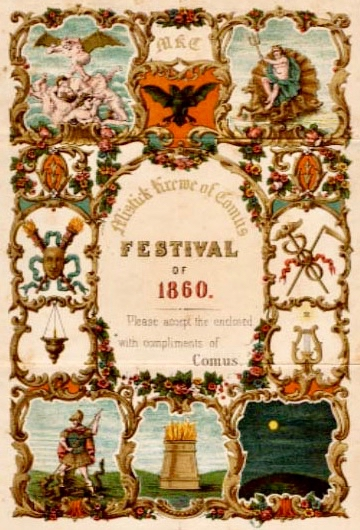
1860

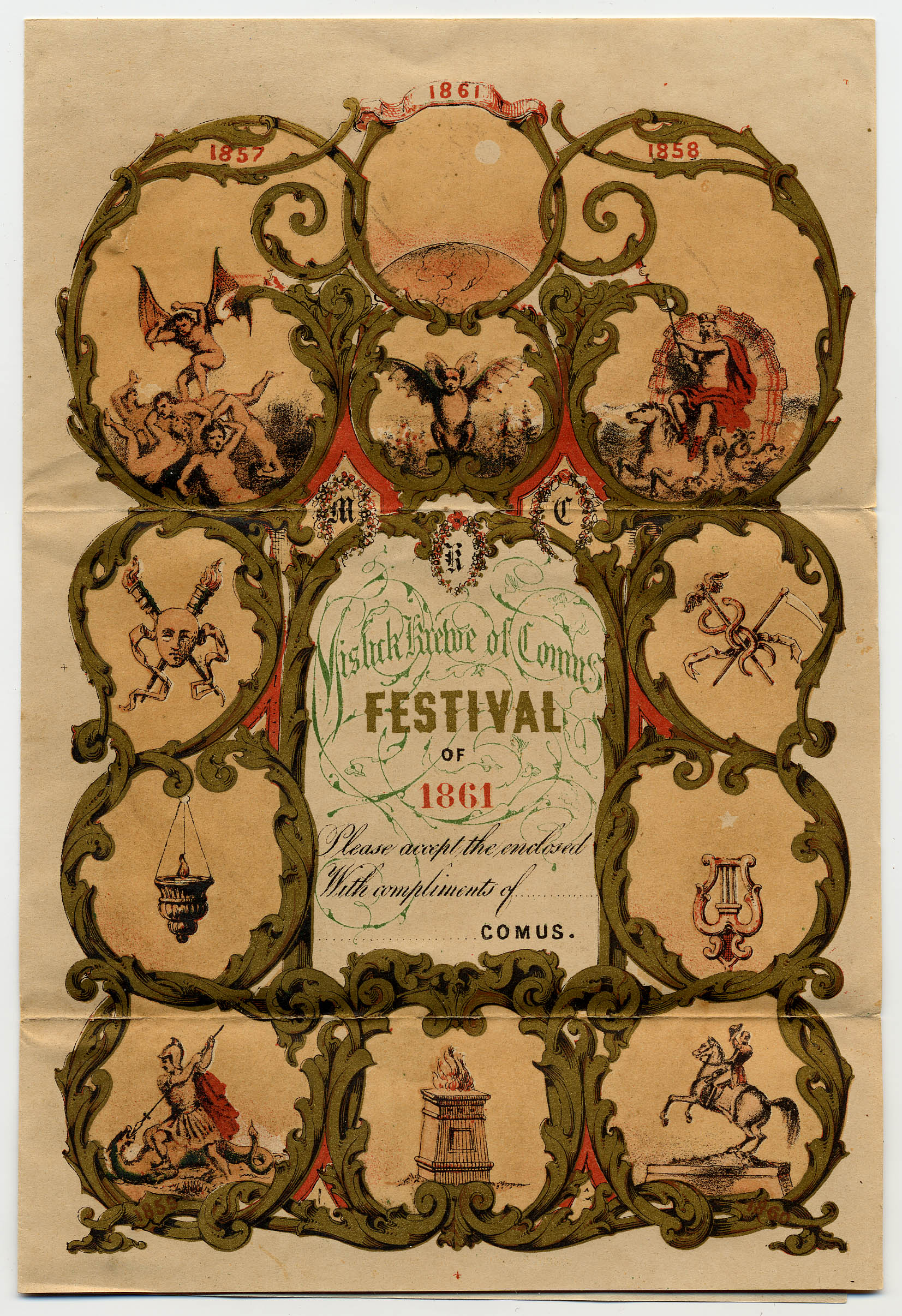
1861

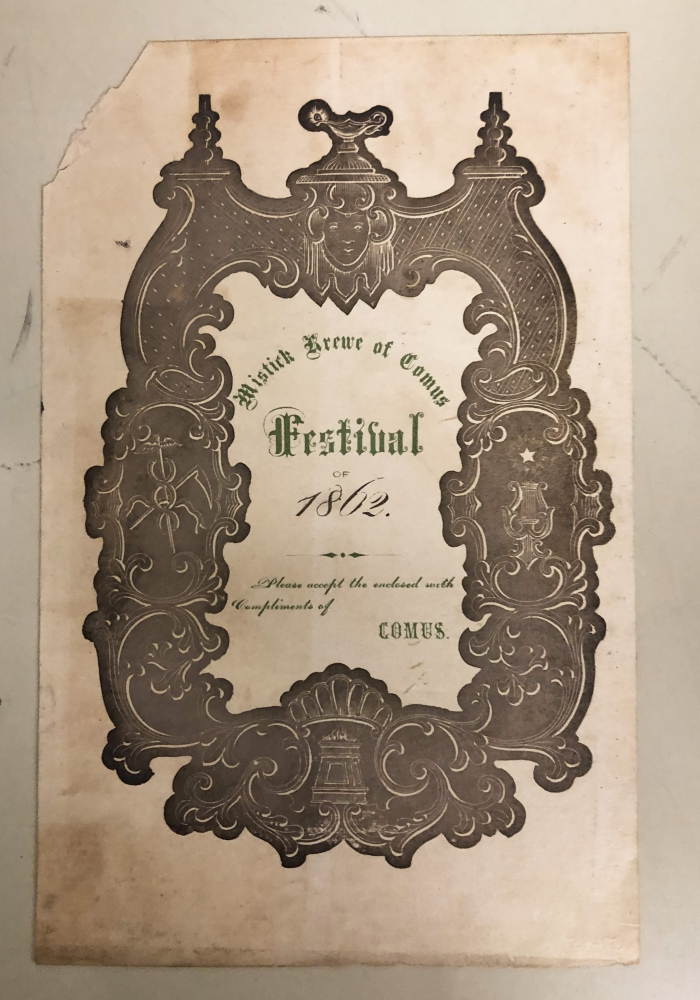
1862

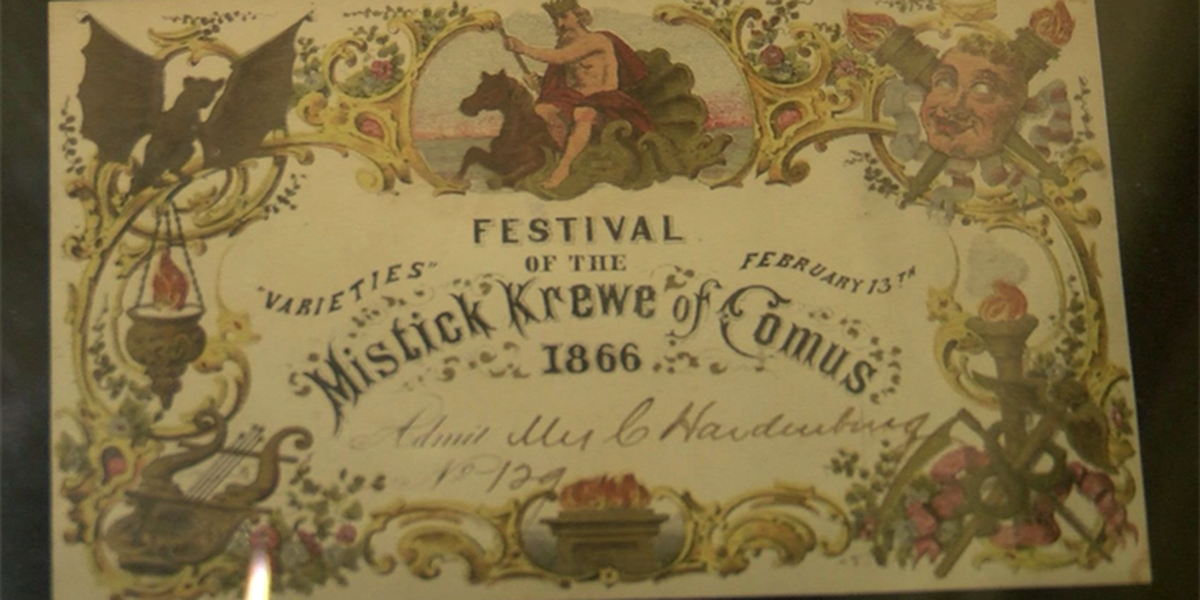
1866 Admittance Card

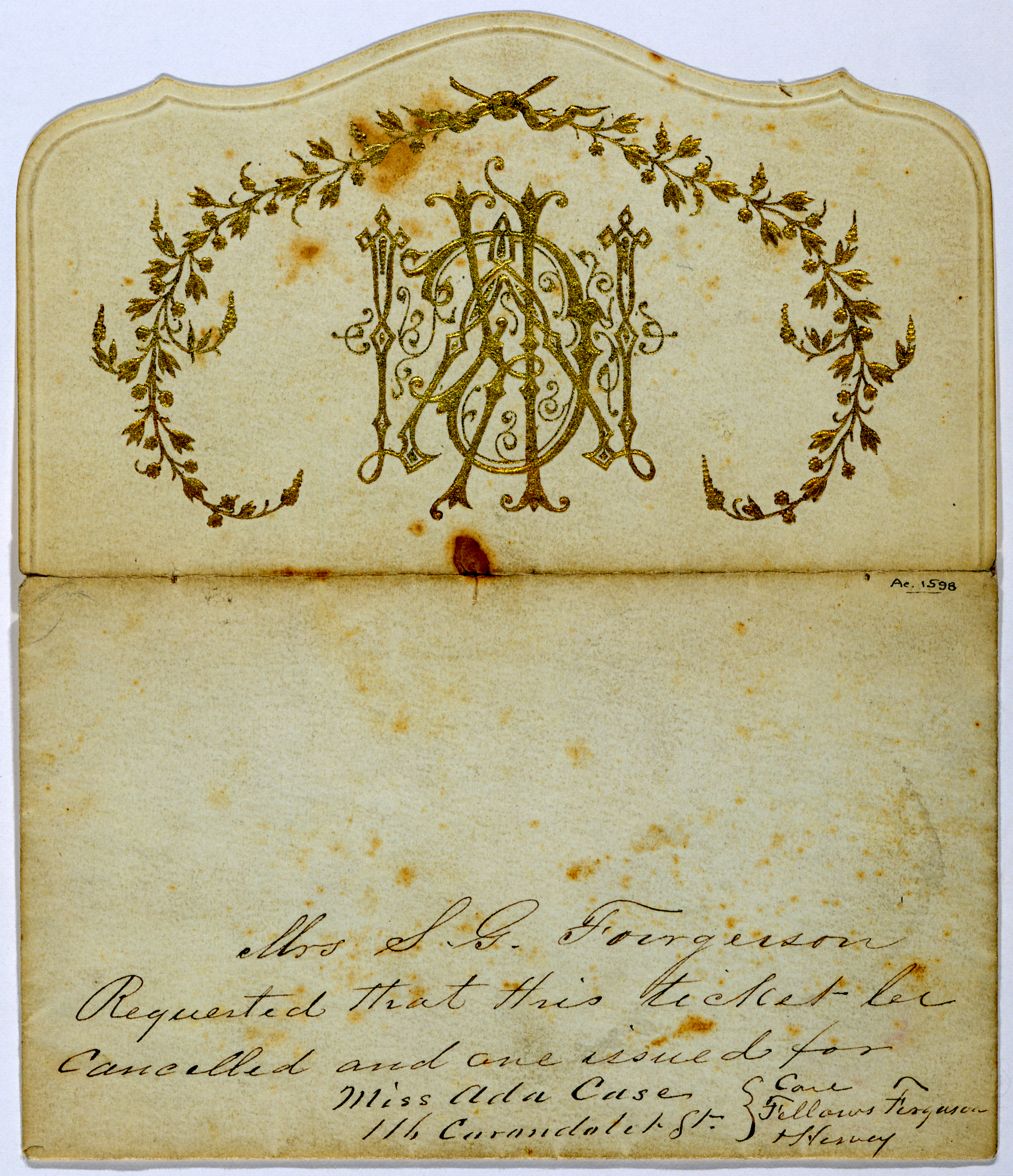
1867 Envelope

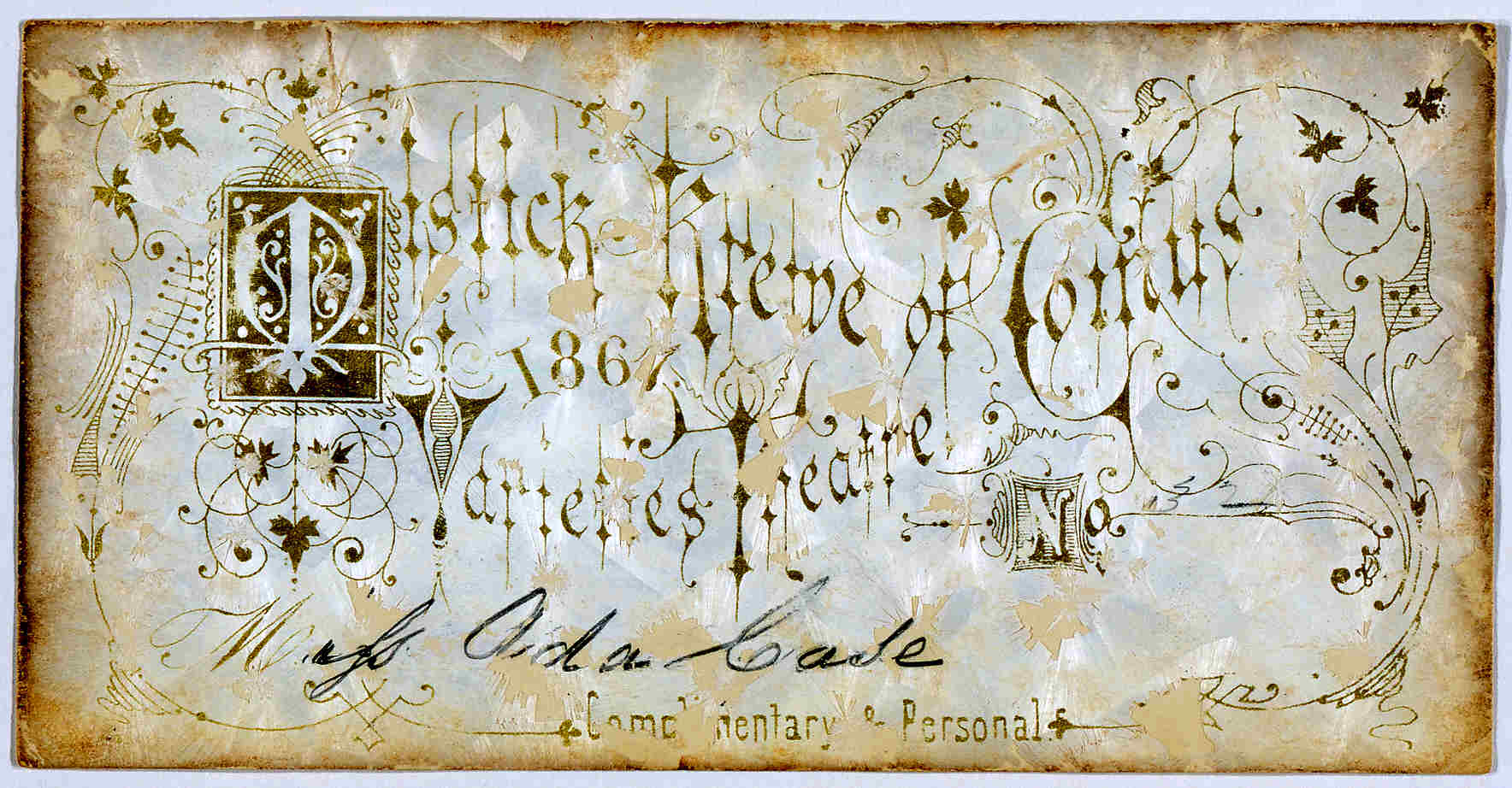
1867 Admittance card

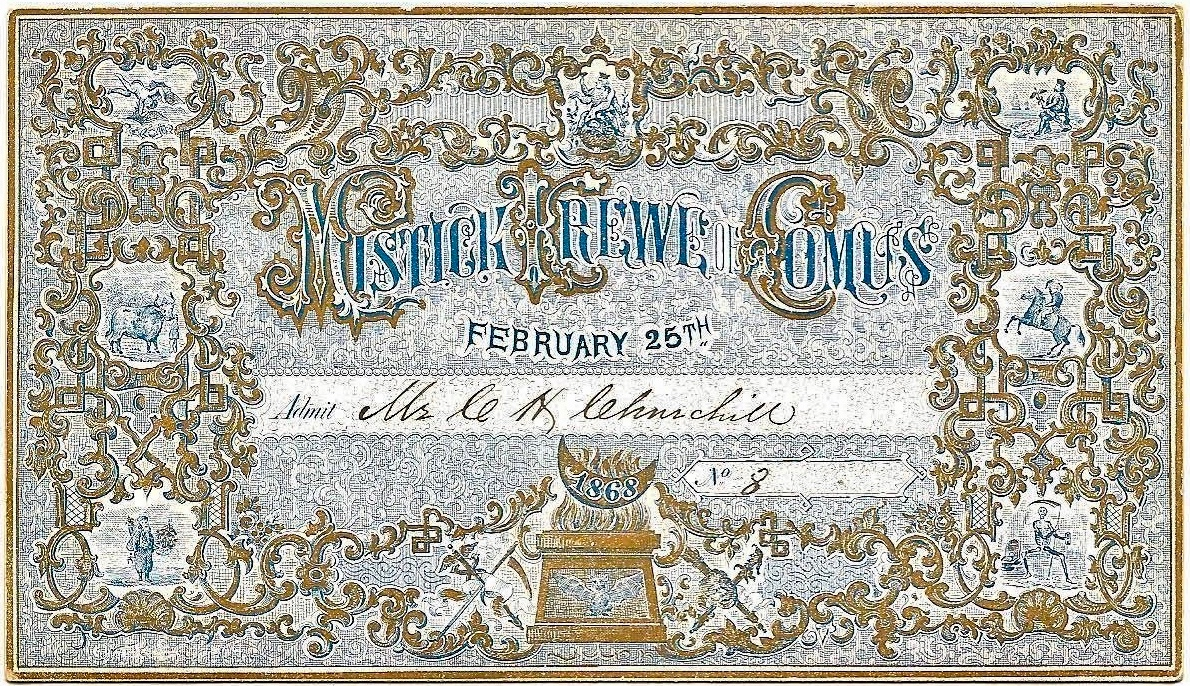
1868 Admittance Card

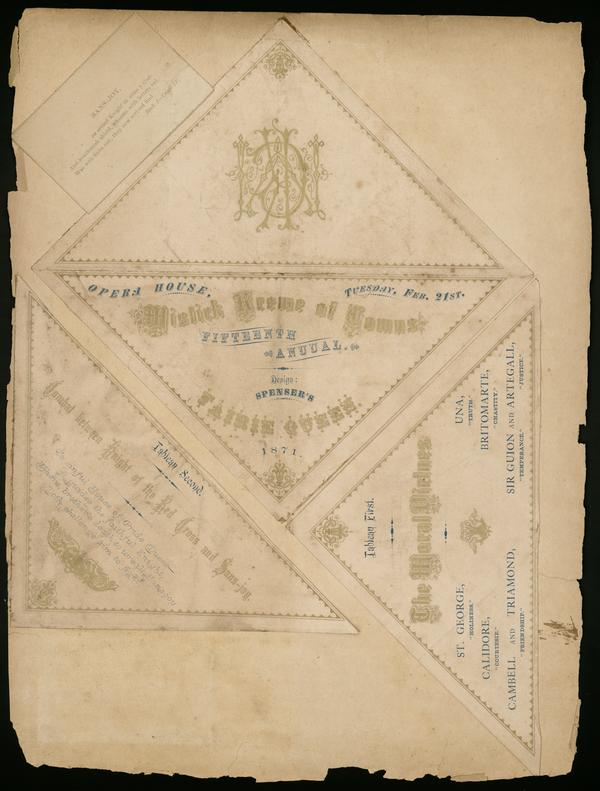
1871

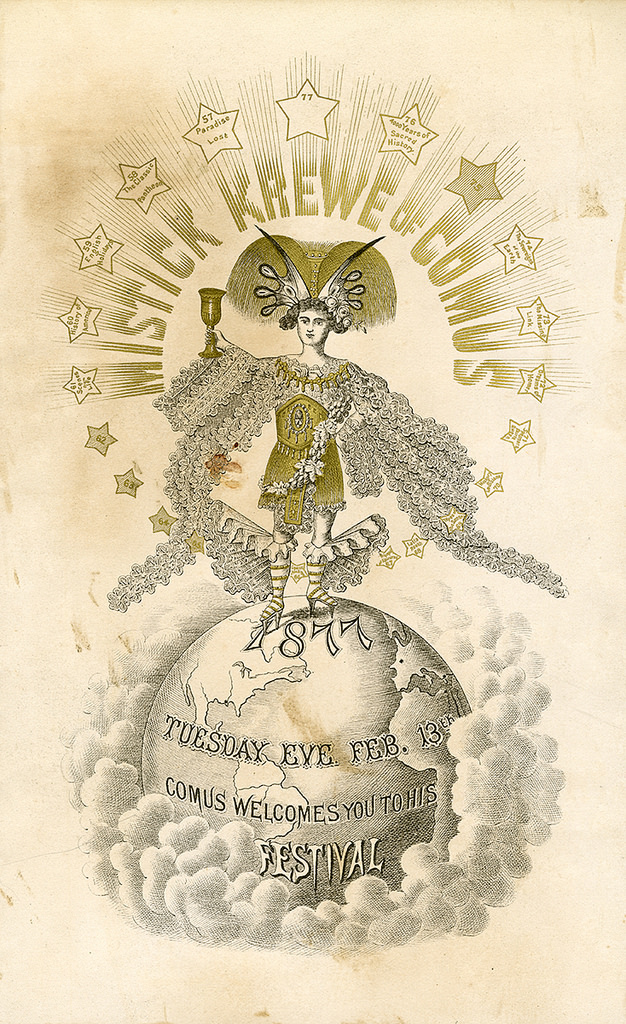
1877

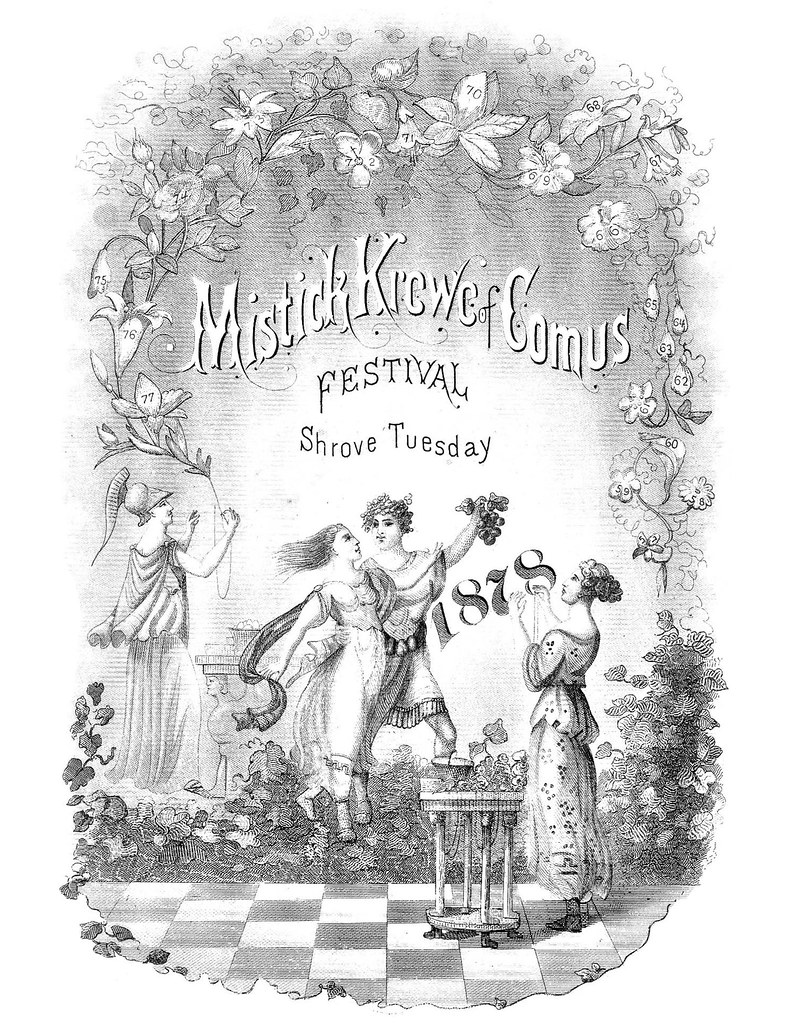
1878

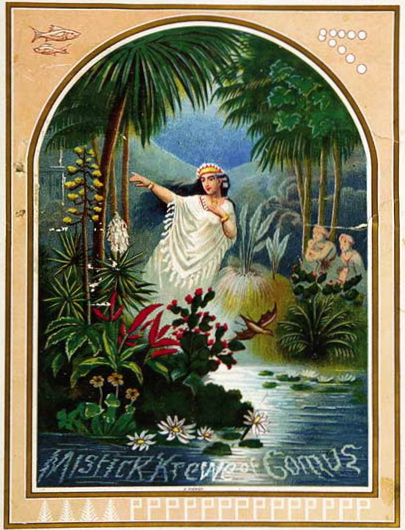
1880

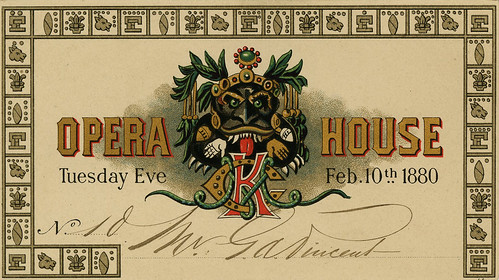
1880 Admittance card

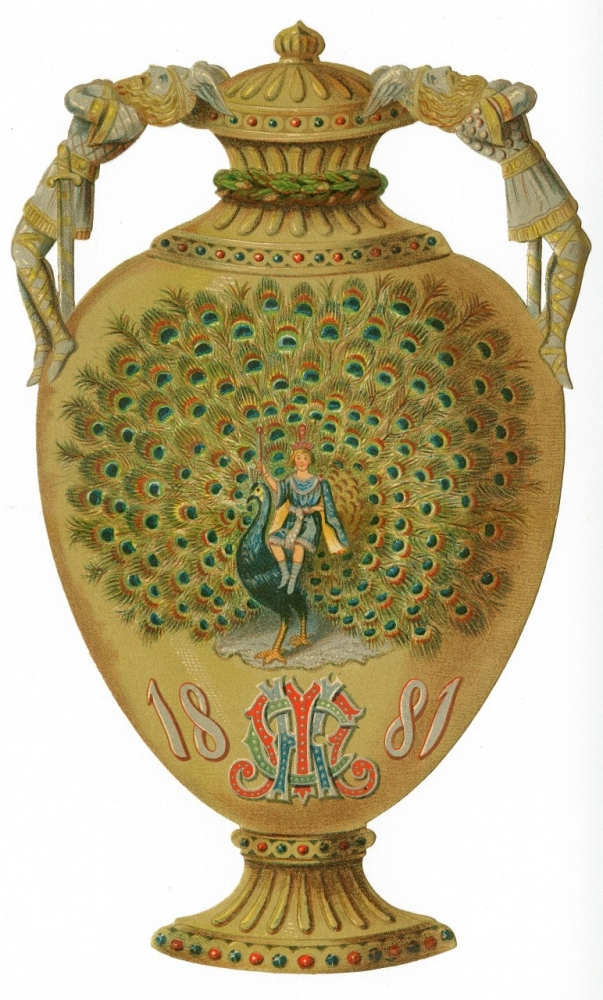
1881

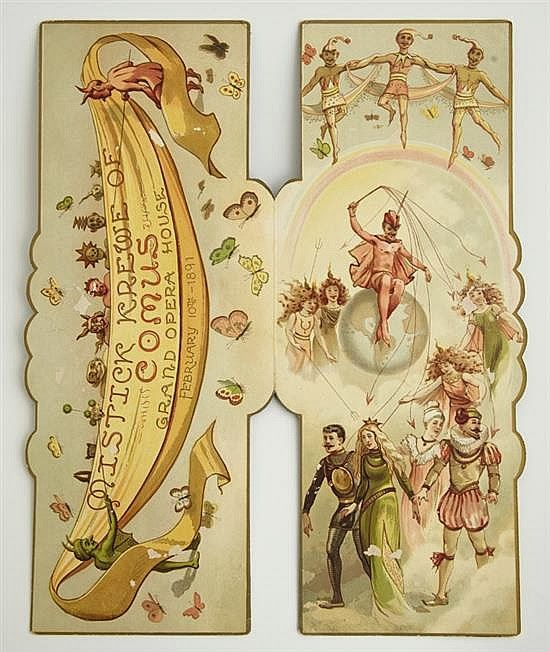
1891

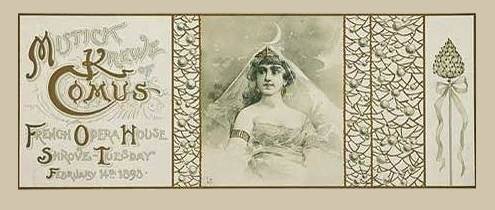
1893

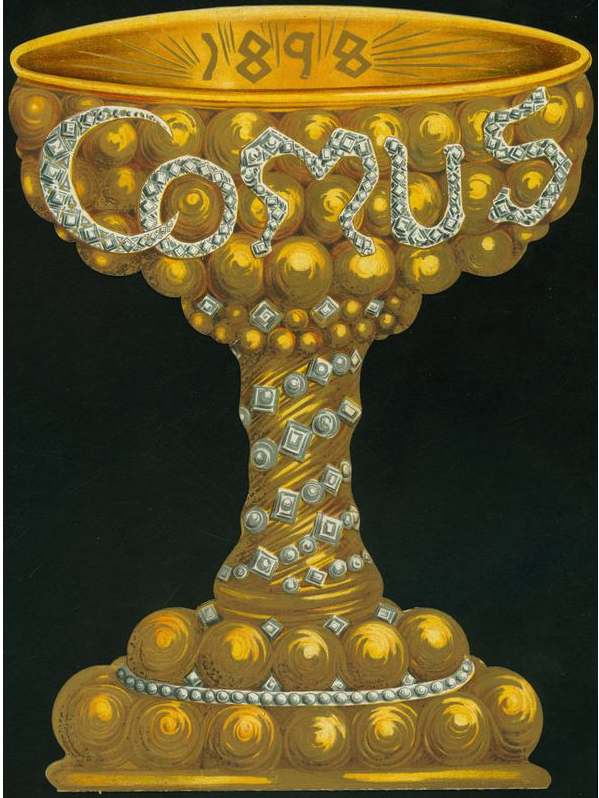
1898

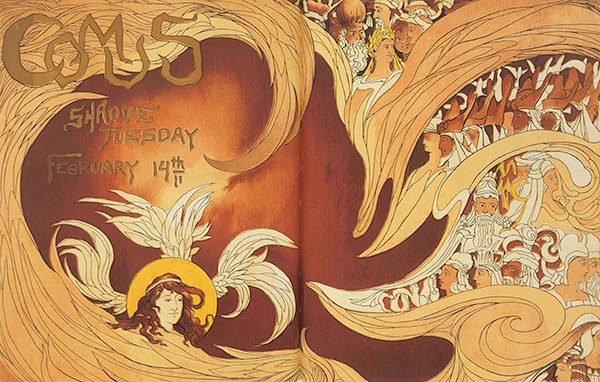
1899

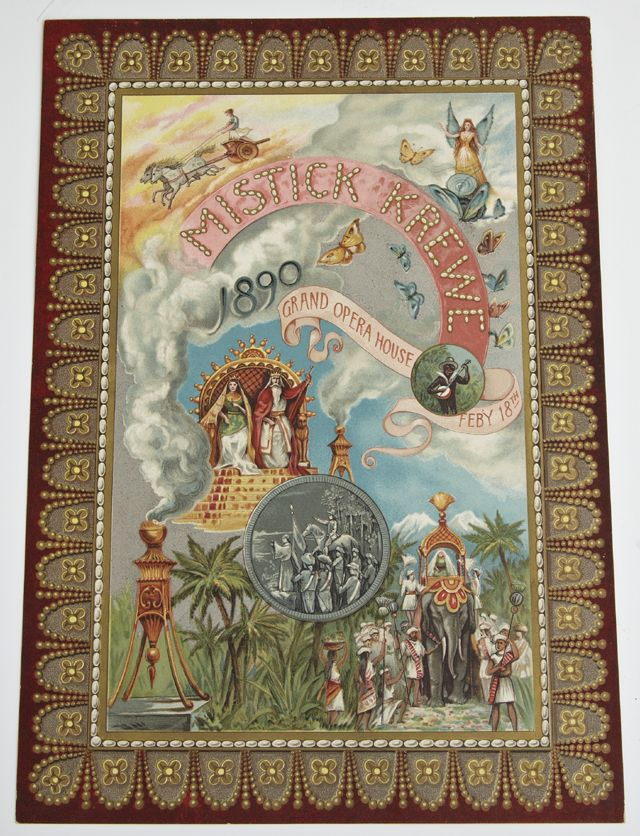
1890

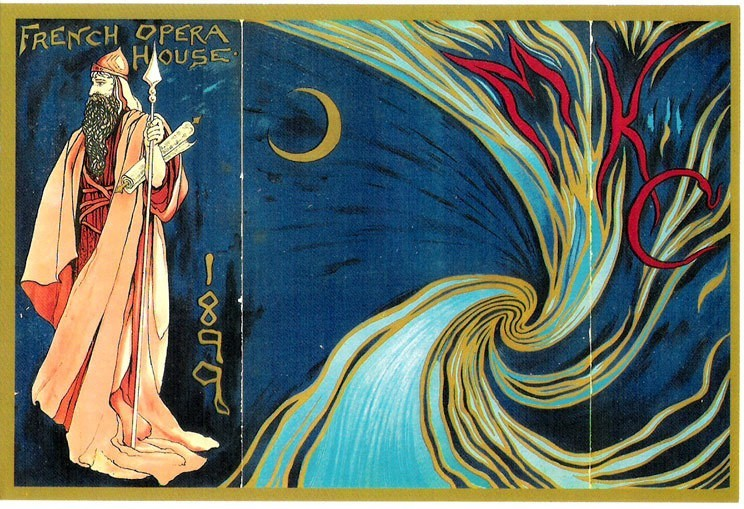
1899

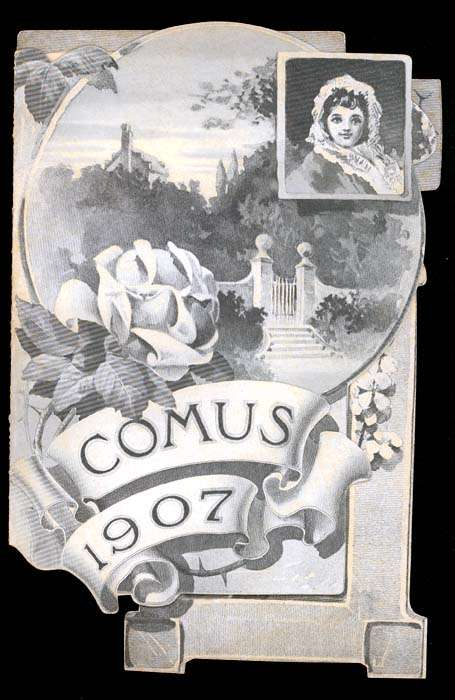
1907

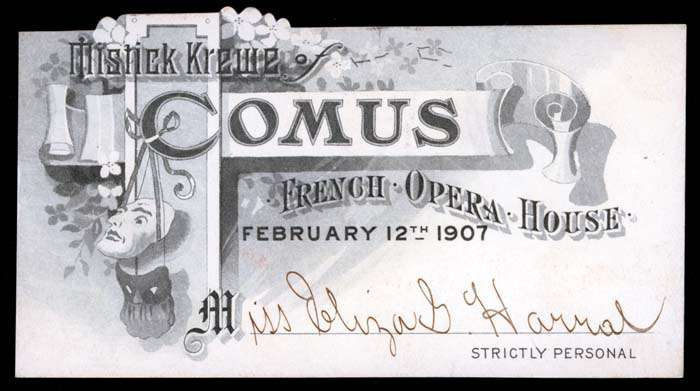
1907 Admittance card

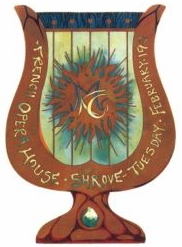
1910

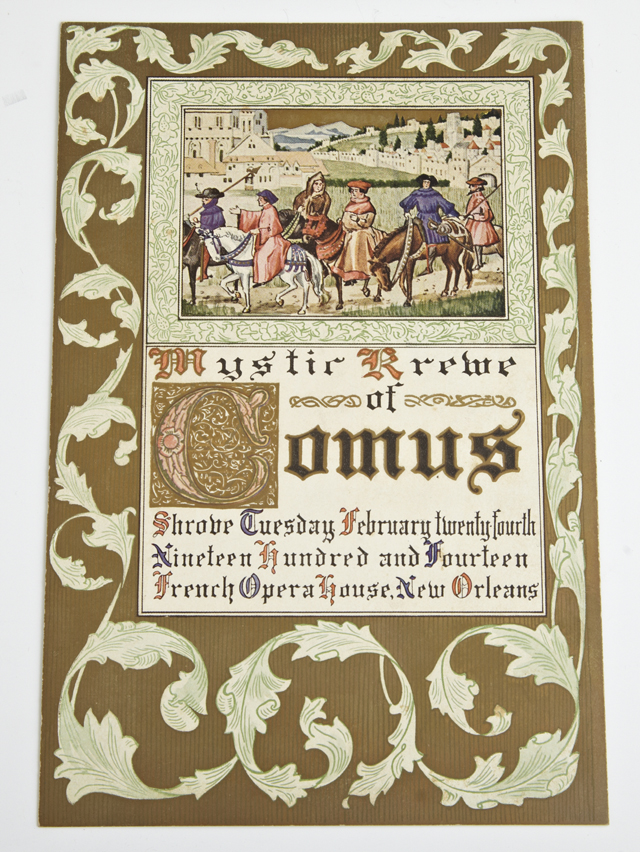
1914

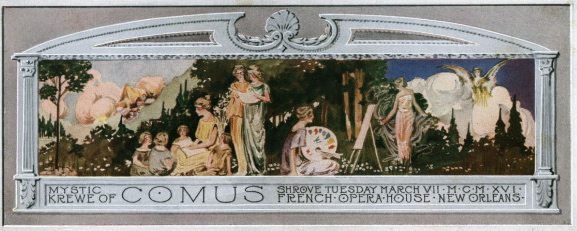
1916 Admittance card

=== Parade ===
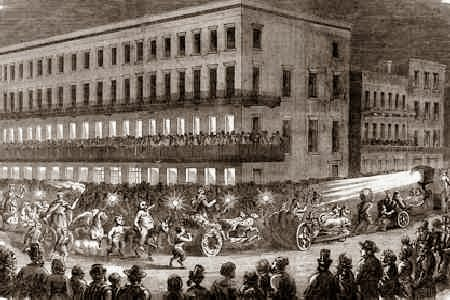
1858

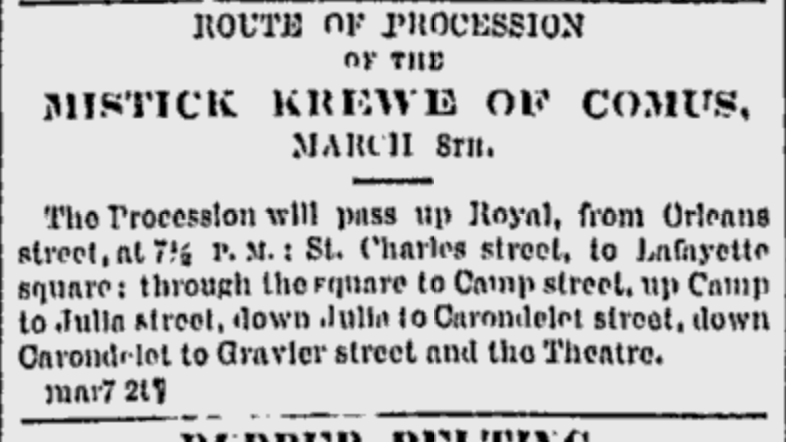
Route 1859

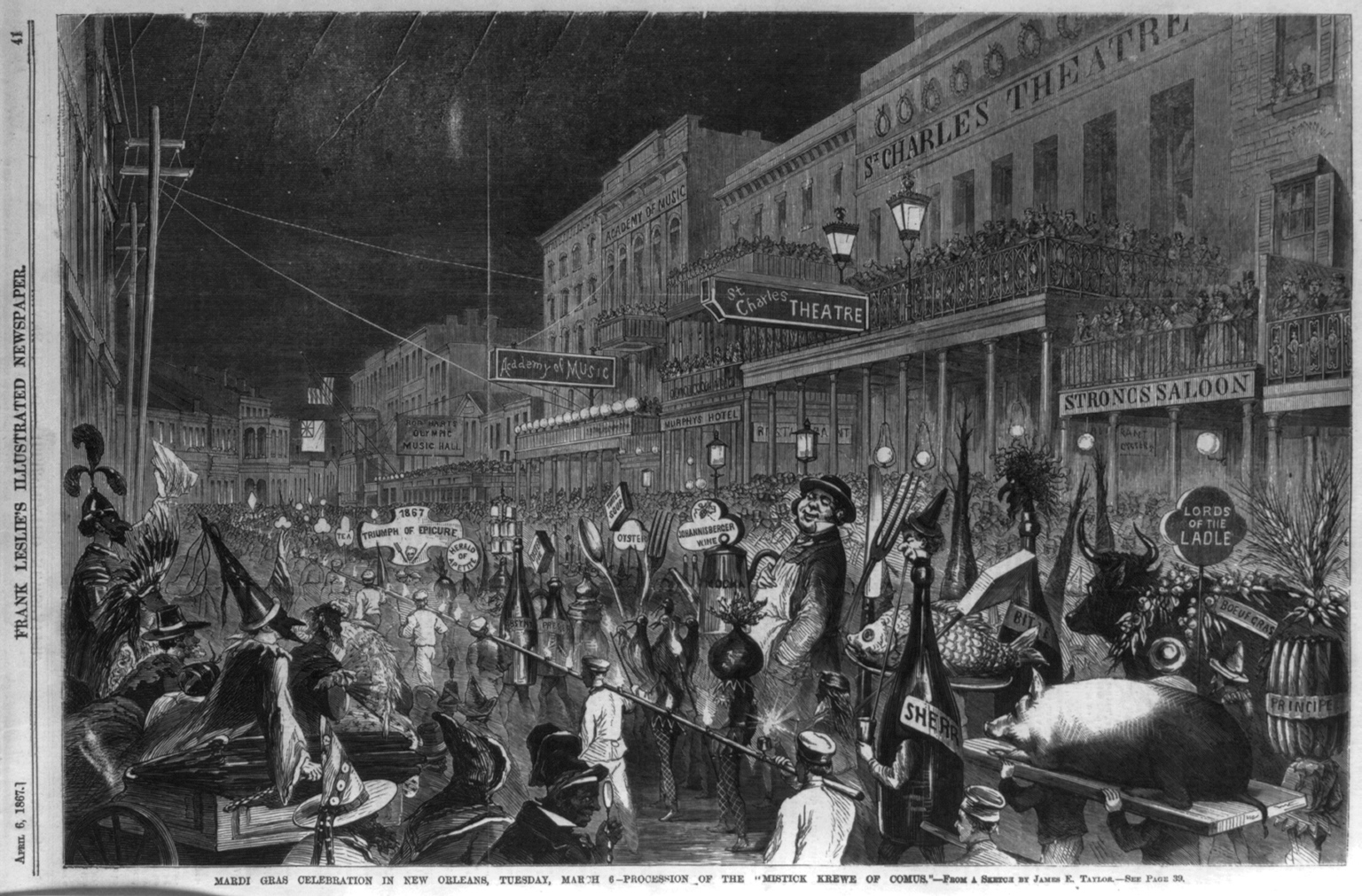
1867

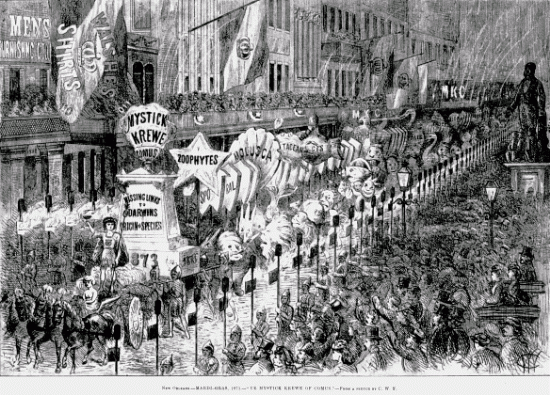
1873

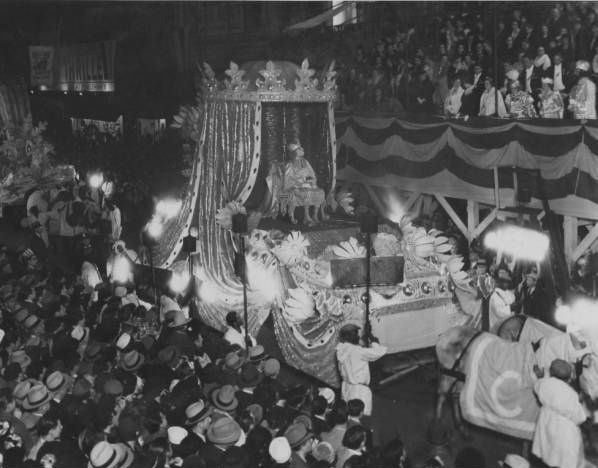
COMUS 1934

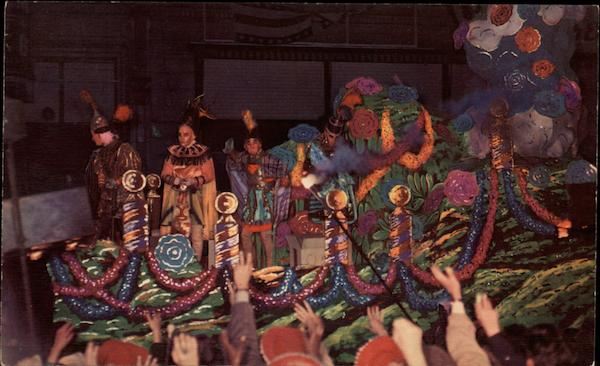
1950's Parade

=== Programs ===
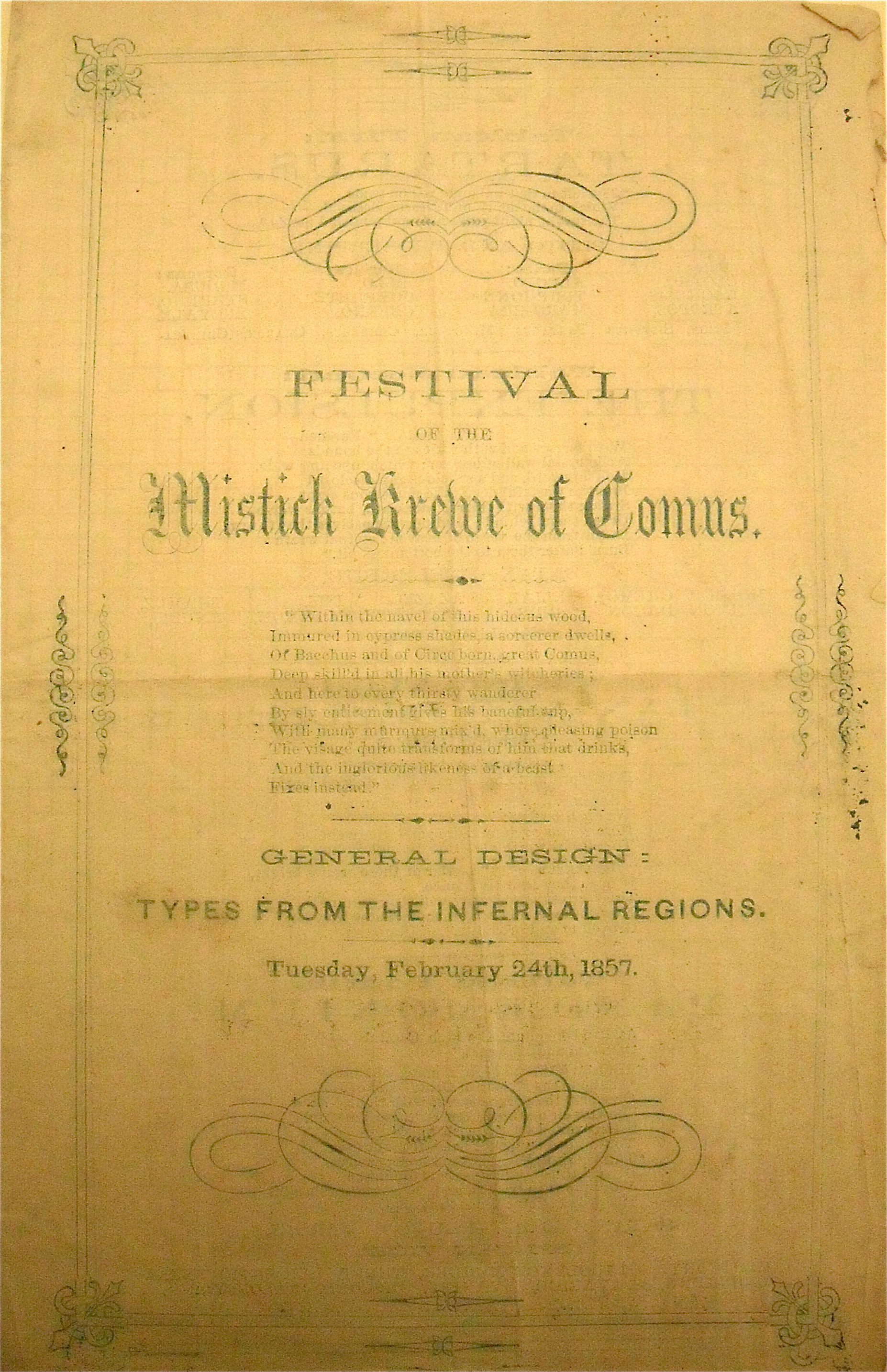
1857

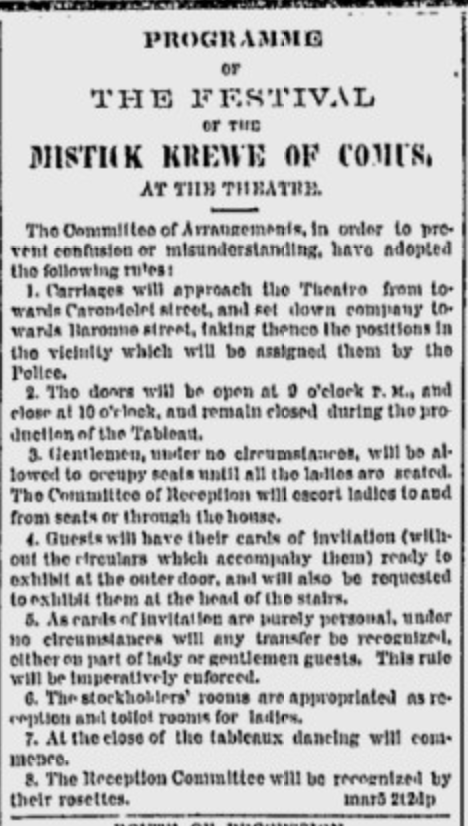
1859 The Daily True Delta

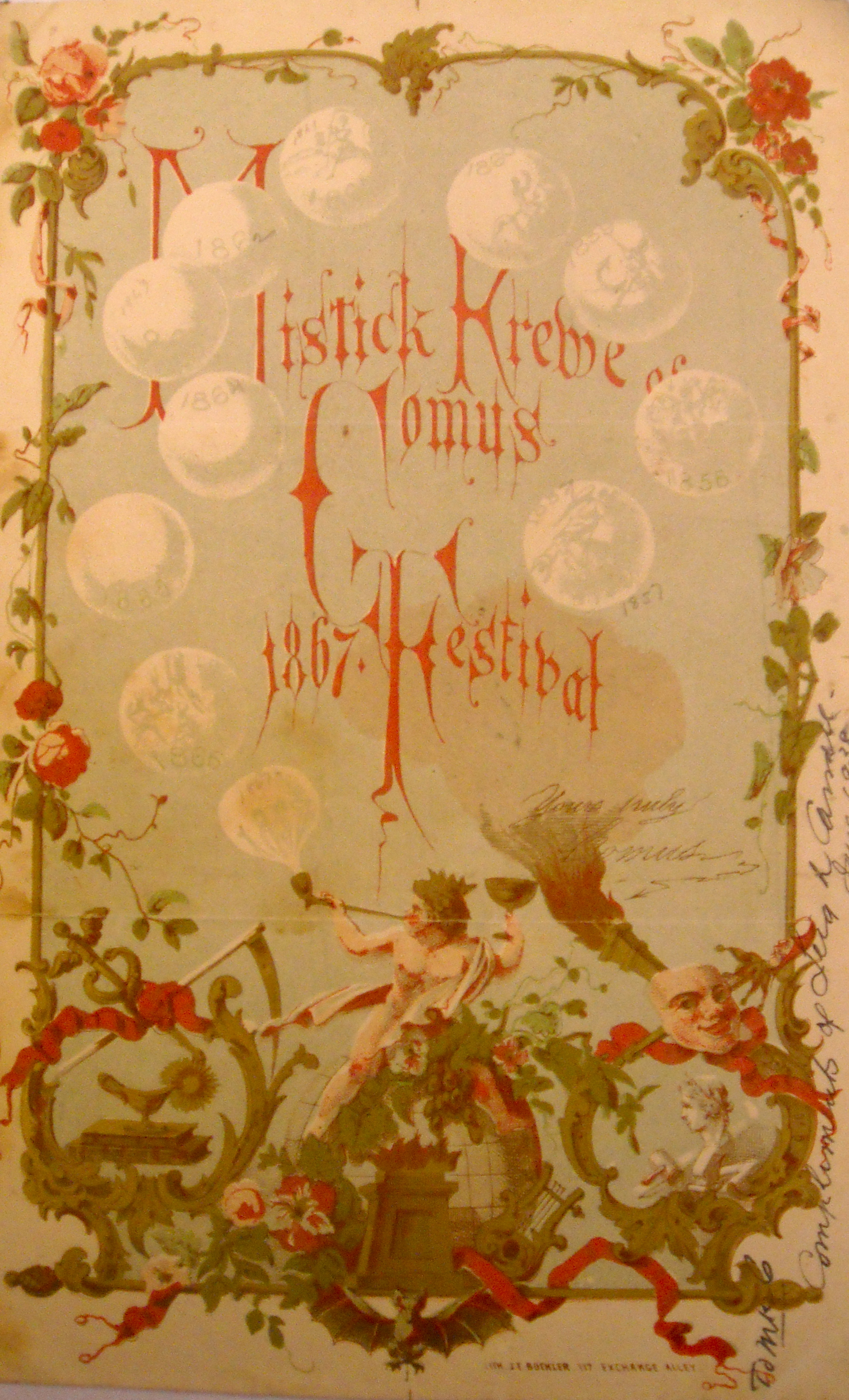
1867

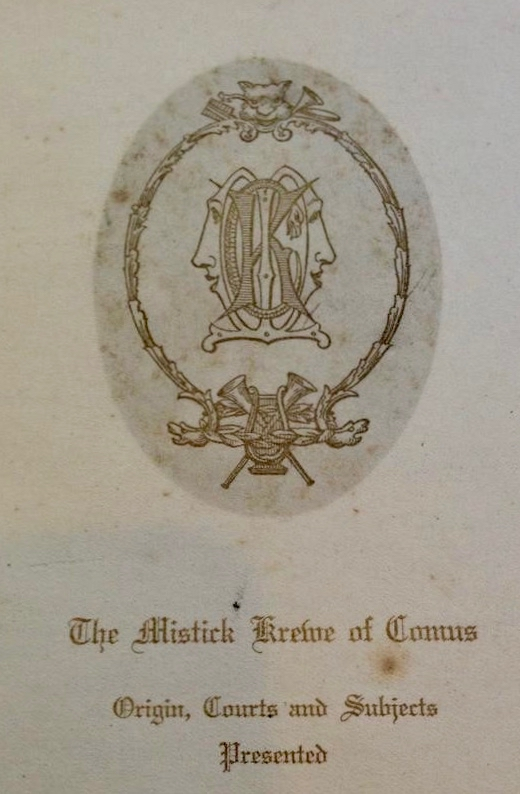
1925

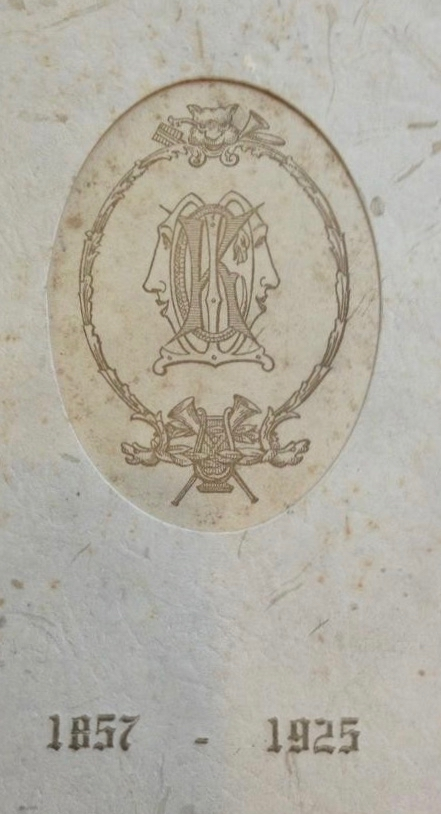
1925

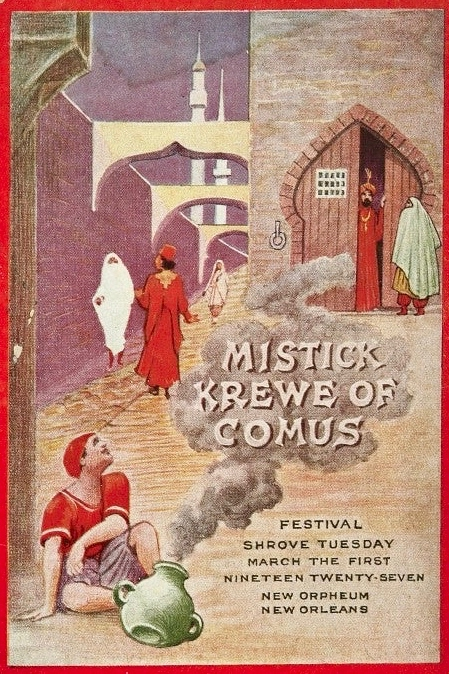
1927

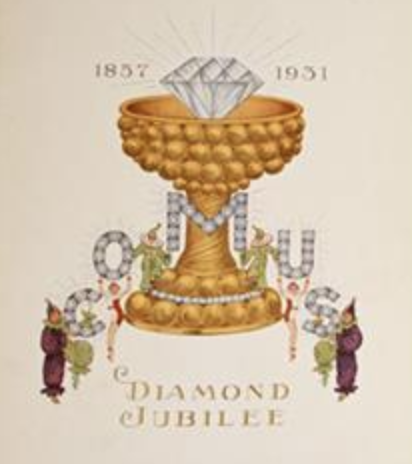
Diamond Jubilee 1931

=== Tableau ===
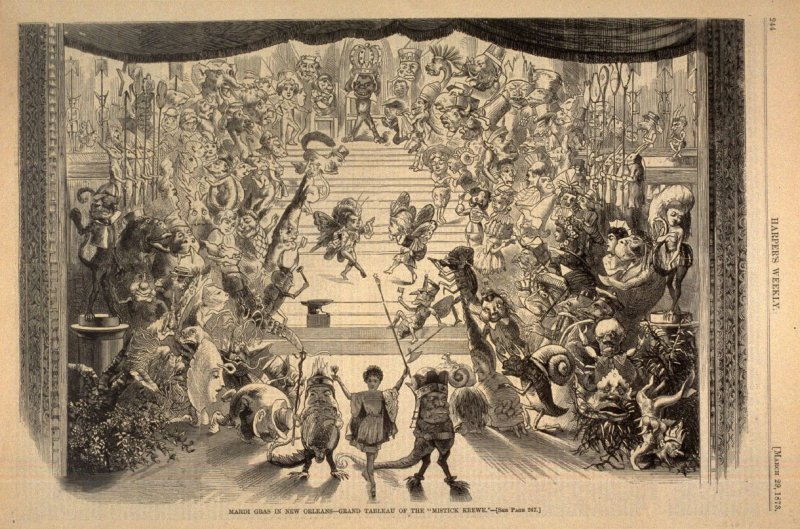
1873

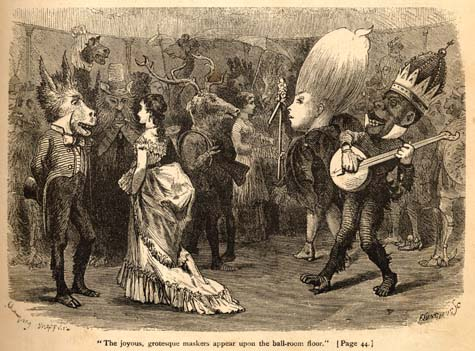
1875

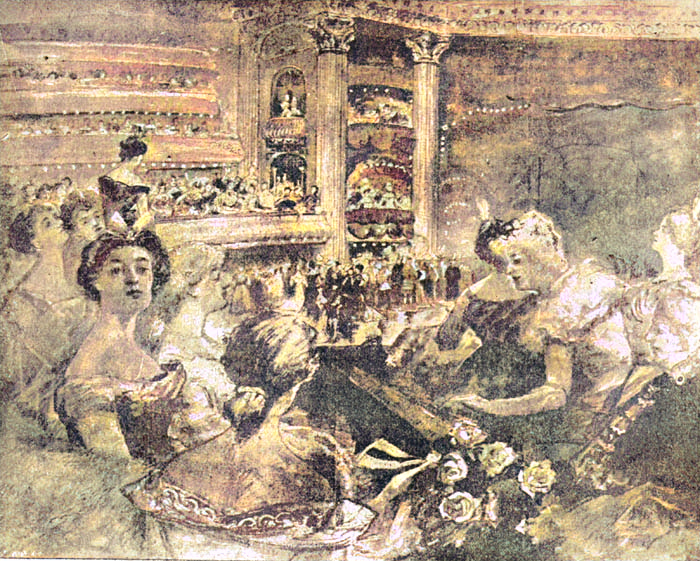
1900

== Respites from revelry ==
From the first Comus parade until a police strike in 1979, nothing suspended New Orleans' lavish Mardi Gras celebrations except war. On March 1, 1862, Comus issued his first proclamation suspending Carnival revelry on account of war. On that day, the New Orleans Daily Picayune published this notice:

To Ye Mistick Krewe –

GREETINGS!

WHEREAS, War has cast its gloom over our happy homes and care usurped the place where joy is wont to
hold its sway. Now, therefore, do I deeply sympathizing with the general anxiety, deem it proper to
withhold your Annual Festival in this goodly Crescent City and by this proclamation do command no assemblage
of the

-MISTICK KREWE-

Given under my hand this, the 1st day of March A.D. 1862.
Comus

— Comus, in proclamation

Comus issued an identical proclamation in 1917 (for World War I), another in 1942 (for World War II), and again in 1951 (for the Korean War). On each occasion, the Captain of Comus persuaded the Captains of other Krewes to refrain from organized revelry during international hostilities.

From 1885–1889, the Mistick Krewe chose not to parade, although other observances continued. During this period, the Krewe of Proteus moved its parade to Carnival night. When Comus resumed parading in 1890, Proteus refused a request to withdraw from parading on Mardi Gras night. The same year, the two parades collided on Canal Street, nearly reaching an impasse. As the Captains of the two groups exchanged defiant expressions, a Comus masker diverted the horse bearing the Captain of Proteus, and Comus was able to complete its procession.

== Withdrawal from parading ==
In 1991 the New Orleans City Council, led by Democrat Dorothy Mae Taylor, passed an ordinance that required social organizations, including Mardi Gras Krewes, to certify publicly that they did not discriminate on the basis of race, religion, gender, disability, or sexual orientation, in order to obtain parade permits and other public licensure. The Comus organization (along with Momus and Proteus, other 19th-century Krewes) withdrew from parading, rather than racially integrating (Proteus returned to parading in 2000). Two federal courts later decided that the ordinance was an unconstitutional infringement on First Amendment rights of free association and an unwarranted intrusion into the privacy of the groups subject to the ordinance. The Krewe of Comus never resumed its parading.

== Early affiliation with The Pickwick Club ==
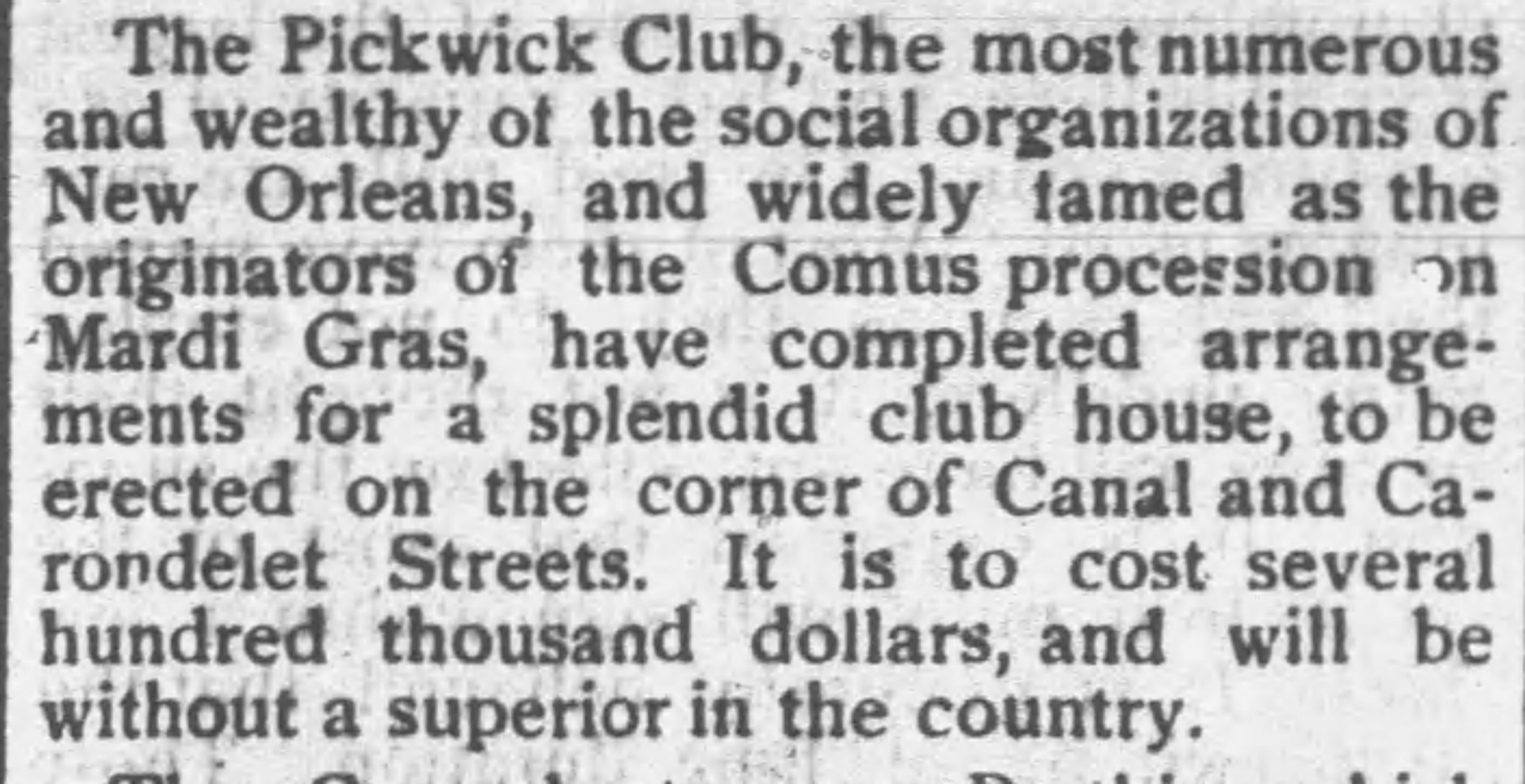
The Pickwick Club Comus New Orleans The Selma Times Fri Jun 2 1882

It is generally known by now that the Pickwick Club, in its beginnings, was the public shield behind which the revelries of the Mistick Krewe were planned and executed. The two were one, but only the Club was known to the public, and the allegiance of the early Pickwickian to the Mistick Krewe was a sacred secret. The fame of each grew independently until distinction became necessary in 1884. The Krewe came first into being, but soon resolved itself into the Club, in the same tradition as The Louisiana Club and the Knights of Momus along with The Stratford Club and the High Priests of Mithras carry one today.

In the 20th and early 21st centuries, their membership is not identical; but it is believed that there are members common to both groups.

== Carnival secrecy and exclusivity ==
The Mistick Krewe has guarded the identities of its membership and the privacy of its activities (other than its parade), perhaps even more than the other Carnival organizations subscribing to the traditional code of secrecy.

Legend has it that admittance to the Mistick Krewe's ball was so highly sought-after that a group of uninvited ladies formed a flying wedge and attempted to force their way into the Comus ball. In other years, uninvited persons have tried to beg, buy, or steal invitations to the ball.

Even after the Mystic Krewe of Comus ball is over, its invitations are prized by collectors.

== Meeting of the courts ==
The Mistick Krewe of Comus also originated another Carnival tradition: the "Meeting of the Courts". The practice originated in 1882, when Rex (the King of Carnival) and his Queen paid a formal visit to the throne of Comus. This ritualized meeting eventually evolved into the symbolic conclusion of the Mardi Gras season, a practice which continues to this day.

Although Rex is the titular King, some observers believe that the Meeting of the Courts – in which Rex leaves his own festivities and is received by a seated Comus at the Mistick Krewe's bal masque – establishes Comus as the more prestigious of the two organizations in the Carnival hierarchy.

== Mardi Gras parades ==
The first Comus parade was held on Mardi Gras 1857, and this became an annual event. Other organizations sprang up in New Orleans in the 19th century, inspired by the Comus model, and also came to be known as Krewes.

Parading on Mardi Gras night, Comus was the final parade of the carnival season for over 100 years. It was much smaller and more sedate than the other parades of the day put on by Rex and the Zulu Social Aid & Pleasure Club.

The Comus parades became known for their sometimes obscure themes relating to ancient history and mythology. While other New Orleans parades, especially the newer super krewes of Endymion and Bacchus, might have a theme such as "Foods of the World" or "Broadway Show Tunes", Comus would present themes on the order of "Serpent Deities of the Ancient Near East".

== See also ==
- Striker's Independent Society
- The Pickwick Club
- Knights of Momus
- Krewe
- Twelfth Night Revelers
