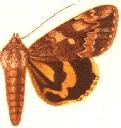

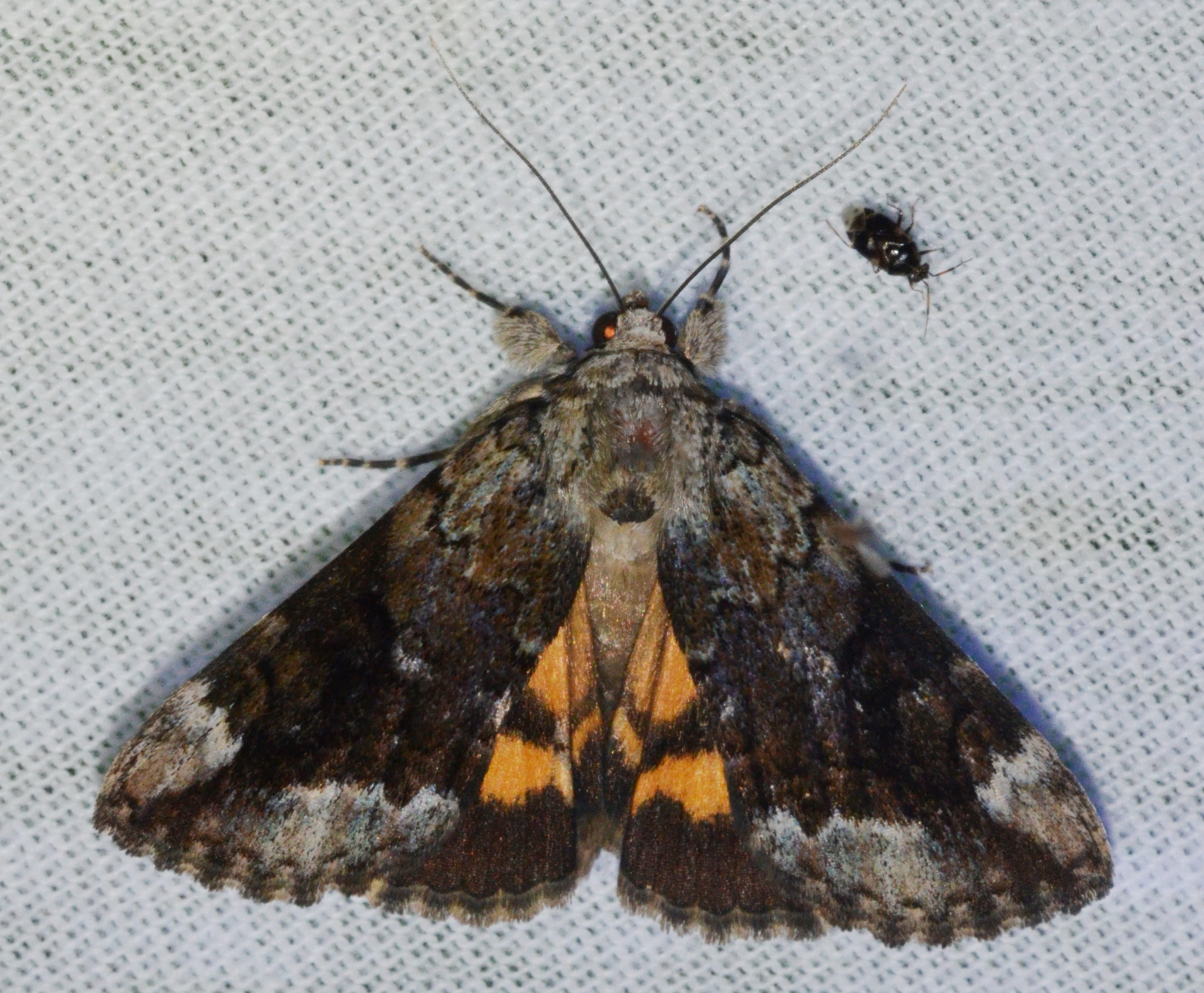

Scientific classification
- Kingdom: Animalia
- Phylum: Arthropoda
- Class: Insecta
- Order: Lepidoptera
- Superfamily: Noctuoidea
- Family: Erebidae
- Genus: Catocala
- Species: C. micronympha

Binomial name
- Catocala micronympha Guenée, 1852

Synonyms
- Ephesia micronympha; Catocala timandra H. Edwards, 1880; Catocala hero Hulst, 1884; Catocala atarah Strecker, 1874; Catocala gisela Meyer, 1880; Catocala fratercula Grote & Robinson, 1866; Catocala helene Pilate, 1882; Catocala ouwah Poling, 1901; Catocala fratercula atarah; Catocala fratercula gisela; Catocala fratercula hero; Catocala fratercula jaquenetta; Catocala fratercula ouwah; Catocala fratercula timandra; Catocala micronympha fratercula; Catocala fratercula var. jacquenetta H. Edwards, 1880; Catocala fratercula var. hero H. Edwards, 1884

= Catocala micronympha =

Little nymph underwing

Species of moth

Catocala micronympha, the little nymph underwing or little bride underwing, is a moth of the family Erebidae. The species was first described by Achille Guenée in 1852. It is found in North America from southern Ontario, Quebec, and Manitoba through New Hampshire, Connecticut, and New Jersey to Florida, west to Texas and then north through Oklahoma, Kansas, Iowa, to Wisconsin and Minnesota and then east to Michigan.

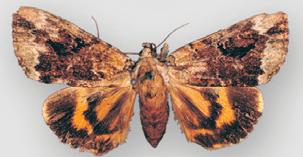
Lectotype of Catocala gisela, now considered to be a synonym of Catocala micronympha

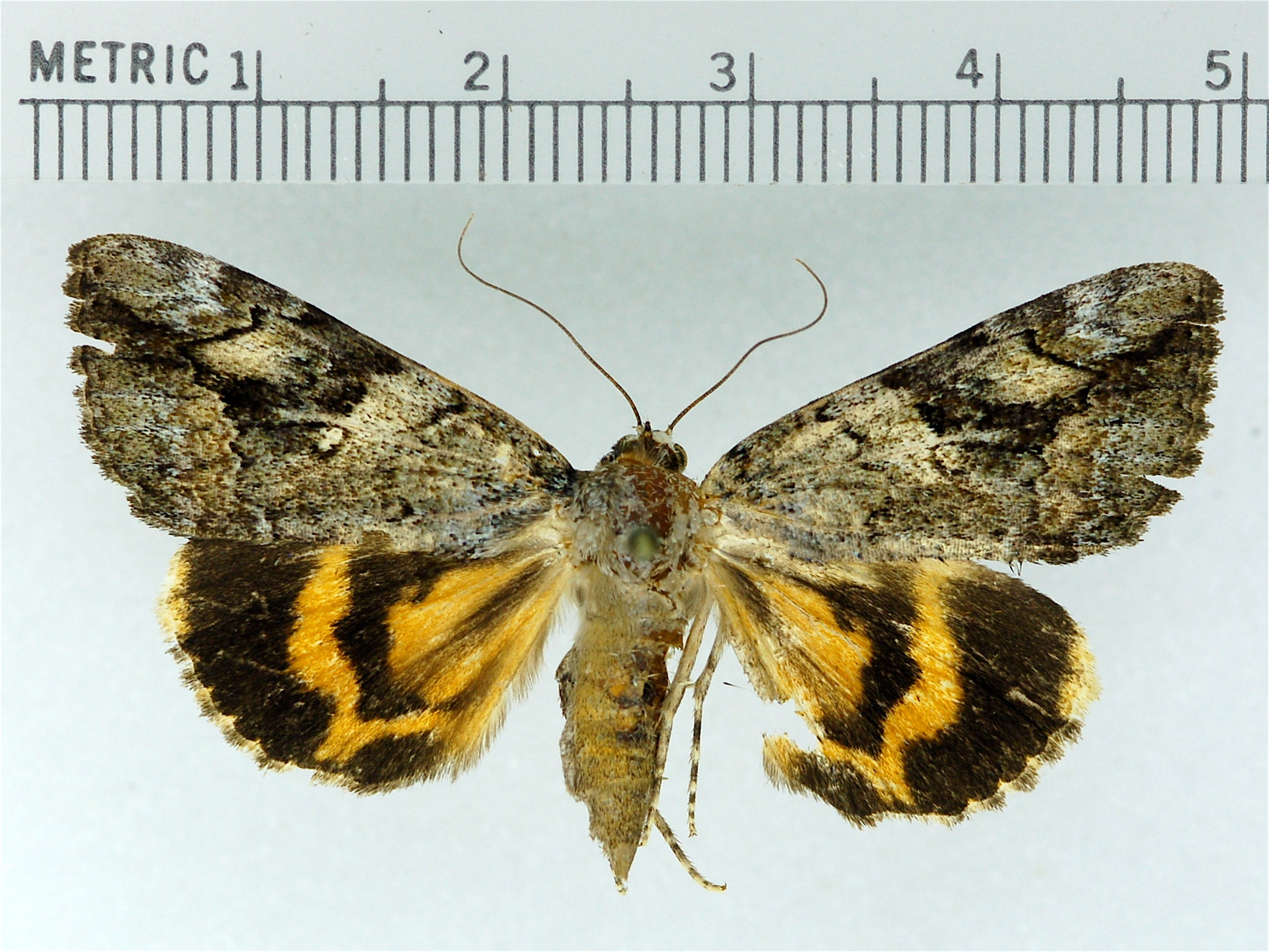

The wingspan is 35–50 mm. Adults are on wing from April to September depending on the location. There is probably one generation per year.

The larvae feed on Quercus macrocarpa, Quercus stellata, and Quercus virginiana
