= The Big Oak =

Tree in Thomasville, GA, USA

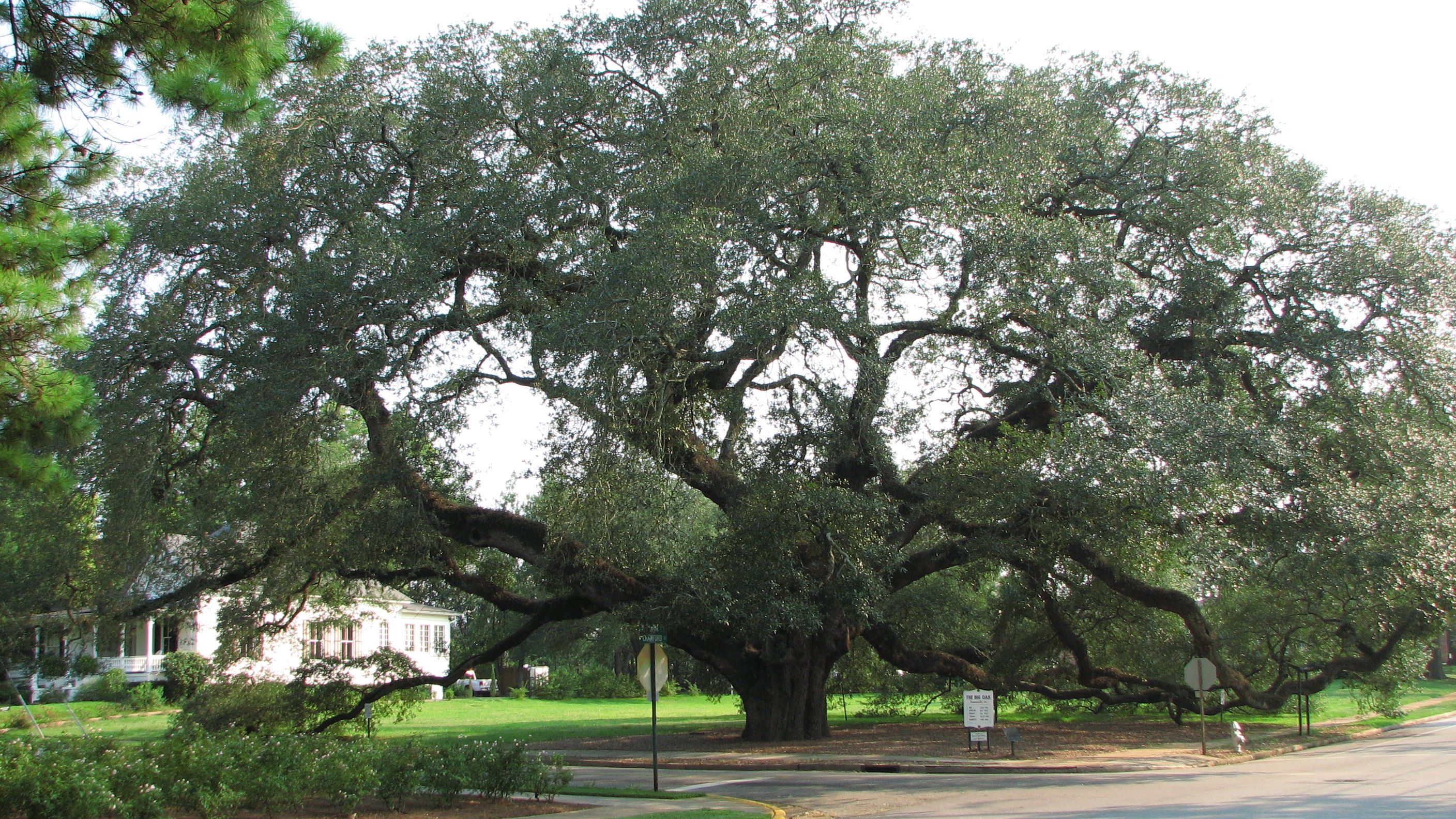
- The Big Oak, located in Thomasville, Georgia is a live oak dating back to about 1680, and is one of the largest of its kind east of the Mississippi River.

- Location within Georgia
- Species: Southern live oak (Quercus virginiana)
- Coordinates: 30.841114°N 83.981721°W

The Big Oak is a large live oak (Quercus virginiana) located in Thomasville, Georgia, in the United States at the corner of Crawford Street and Monroe Street. The Big Oak is one of many historic landmarks located in Thomasville. The Big Oak was one of the earliest trees registered with the Live Oak Society. Registered by P.C. Andrews in 1936, the Big Oak was the forty-ninth live oak registered. At the time of registration, the Big Oak's girth was 21 feet 6 inches.

== Quercus virginiana ==
Quercus virginiana is a species of oak found from Texas to Florida to Virginia. The common names for the Quercus virginiana include the live oak, the southern live oak, and the Texas live oak. Size and growth varies depending on proximity to coastal regions. The larger live oaks tend to grow further inland, whereas live oaks in coastal regions tend to be smaller. Quercus virginiana produces small flowers during the spring, and the tree is pollinated by the wind. The live oak is also considered a rapidly growing species. The growth of the live oak begins very quickly, however as it becomes older its growth rate begins to decline.

== History of the Big Oak ==
The Big Oak dates back to circa 1680, which makes it one of the oldest live oaks in the country. The Thomasville live oak has been recognized several times for its long lifespan by various societies, including the International Society for Agriculture in 1987. The tree has been able to withstand human encroachment for centuries, and remains a major landmark in Thomasville today. The property on which the tree stands was once owned by Mr. and Mrs. John Albert Chastain. The Chastain family owned this property from 1906 until the mid-1960s. The Chastains raised their family in a home under this large live oak for nearly sixty years. Mr. Chastain's mother remembers a time when the Big Oak was standing in a pond, rather than the lot Mr. Chastain remembers. In 1966, Mrs. Elisabeth Ireland Poe and the city of Thomasville, purchased the property and turned it into a public park. Mrs. Poe was famous in Thomasville for her ownership of Pebble Hill Plantation from 1936 until her death in 1978. Mrs. Poe was dedicated to preserving the history and heritage of Thomasville and thus purchased the property along with the city. Also in 1966, a donation of a historic Victorian-style gazebo was made by Mrs. Otto Carter of Meigs, Georgia. This type of gazebo is a rare find in the present day, unless it has been re-fabricated in the Victorian Style. Estimates in 1968 by Thomasville architect Robert Jinright indicated that the cost of building such a gazebo would reach $10,000. The gazebo was restored and remains a focal point of the property today. At a 1969 Commission meeting, a proposal was made by the Thomasville Garden Club to allocate a $5,000 fund, known as the Walter Hildebrand fund, to the beautification of the property. After a unanimous decision by the Board to appropriate the funds, the Garden Center used the money to construct a lattice-work brick wall on two sides of the property. This wall is referred to by members of the community as "The Living Wall." The lot on which the Big Oak stands was dedicated to the memory of Mrs. Elisabeth Ireland Poe on February 7, 1982, by the city of Thomasville. The Big Oak once received a distinguished visitor in 1958. On a hunting visit to Thomasville with colleague George M. Humphrey, Dwight Eisenhower stopped by to take a photograph of the tree on his way to the airport. The President reportedly asked his driver to stop while he took a photograph. He then exited the vehicle, stood on the porch of Mrs. Rudolph Keyton, took his photograph and returned to his car.

The Big Oak has been misidentified by some as a tree that was used for lynchings and other crimes against Thomasville's black community. Jack Hadley, Curator of Thomasville's Black History Museum, believes that this is a completely unsubstantiated claim. In a 2017 column in the local paper, Hadley said that in his 80+ years of living in and researching Thomasville that he had "never seen any proof, documentation and no one has provided me any documentation about the Big Oak Tree in downtown as a lynching tree."

== Preservation of the Big Oak ==
Various efforts have been made to preserve this magnificent landmark in Thomasville. These efforts include the addition of support cables, the implementation of an underground watering system, an above ground sprinkler system, as well as an "on call" tree surgeon. The various support cables are intertwined about the tree in order to provide strength to the limbs, some of which are mere feet above the ground. While efforts to protect the tree have been in place for decades, accidents have happened. In June 1973, a truck struck the tree at 8:15 a.m. The damage was minimal, however the driver of Ochlocknee, Georgia was charged by police for failure to stay on the city truck route. In 1975, two incidents occurred that damaged the Big Oak. City Manager John Baxter and Superintendent of the Department of Parks and Cemeteries Waymon Dekle surveyed the damage and called for immediate action to repair the damaged limbs. Two limbs were damaged by large trucks driving through the area without enough clearance. The Davey Tree Company worked for days to further protect the tree from damage, and perform routine maintenance on its limbs. In 1978 a 14-foot section of a broken limb was "surgically" removed from the tree in order to prevent further damage. According to Waymon Dekle, superintendent of parks and cemeteries, "When we find a diseased or damaged part it should be cut off or we could run the risk of losing the entire tree." The Big Oak has continued to grow throughout the past century, and will continue to do so if precautions are taken to assure its safety. In 1936 when the Big Oak was registered with the Live Oak Society it measured: 49 feet, 9 inches in height, 21 feet, 6.5 inches in girth, and had a limb span of 146 feet, 8 inches. Nearly forty years later, the tree had grown substantially. With a height of 68 feet, a girth of 22 feet and a span of 155 feet it was clear that the Oak was thriving in Thomasville.

== The Big Oak today ==
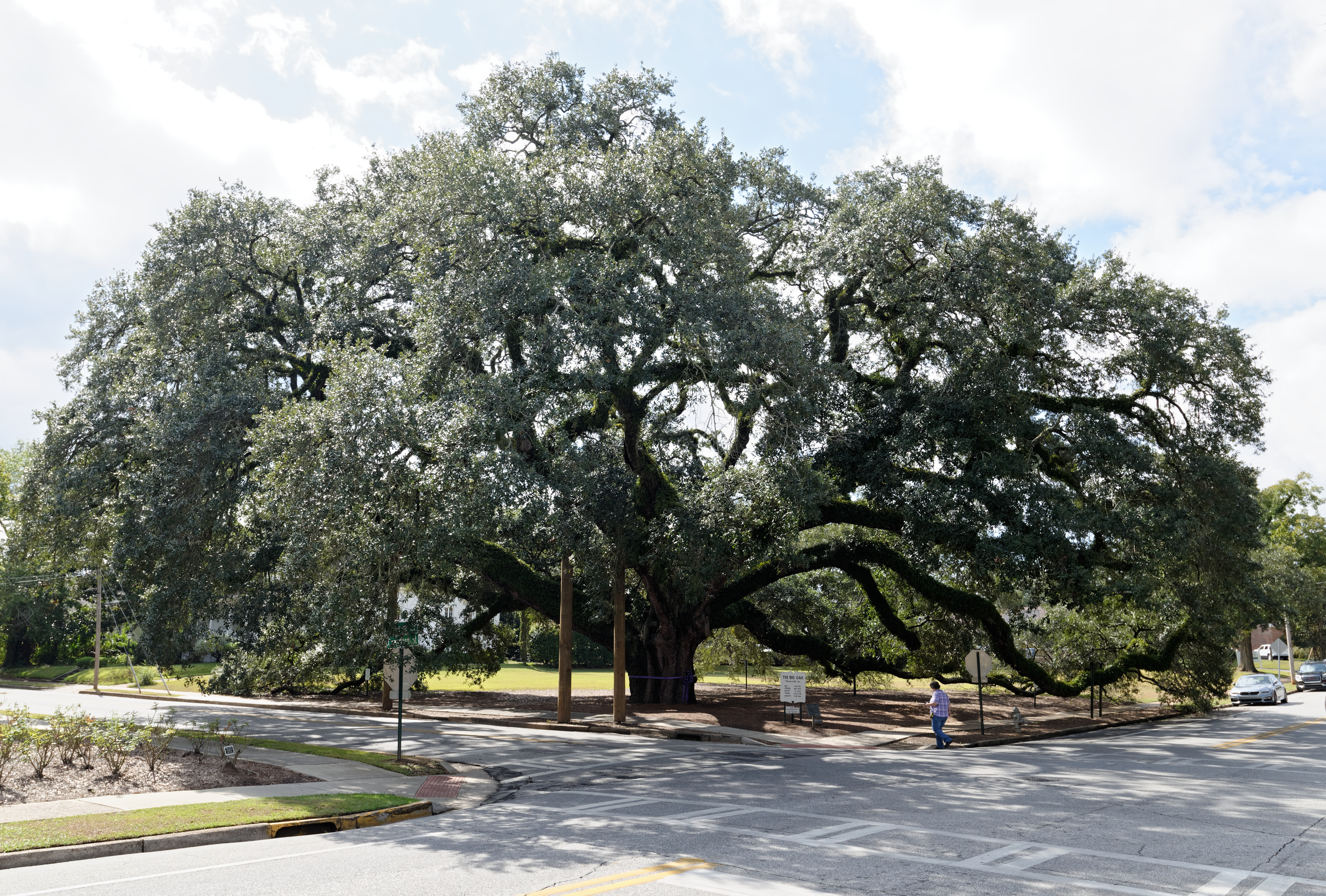
The Big Oak in 2019

Efforts continue today to protect this historical tree from being damaged by people, however some damage has still occurred. On November 30, 2005, truck driver, James Hayden, collided with two of the trees large limbs and wrenched them from the tree. The Thomasville Police Department charged the driver with "Disobeying a traffic control device." The Big Oak is a very popular location for weddings and various other social gatherings. In 1985 alone, 23 weddings took place underneath the tree. Many receptions for various community events are held in the gazebo, as well as Easter sunrise services, picnics, and school field trips. The Big Oak serves as one of many tourist attractions in Thomasville. In 2005 The Big Oak produced acorns for the first time in decades. During the fall of 2005, Mrs. Carol SIngletary, granddaughter of John Albert Chastain, collected over one hundred acorns and cared for them throughout the germination process. When they were large enough she placed them in potted soil and continued to raise them until they became seedlings. Of the remaining seedlings from the original one hundred acorns, Mrs. Singletary gave them to relatives who share her history of the property. Of the seedlings, several were given to Mrs. Singletary's sister, Rebecca Hasty Boswell. Mrs. Boswell raised three of the seedlings, and on Arbor Day 2009 Mrs. Singletary presented Sue White of Pebble Hill Plantation with one of these seedlings. The tree was planted on Pebble Hill Plantation, and is referred to as "The Baby Big Oak."

As of 2019, the spread of the tree is 169 feet, the height is 72 feet, and the circumference of the trunk is 27.9 feet.

== See also ==
- List of individual trees
