= Seven Sisters Oak =

Southern live oak in Mandeville, Louisiana

Coordinates: 30°22′2″N 90°5′55.5″W

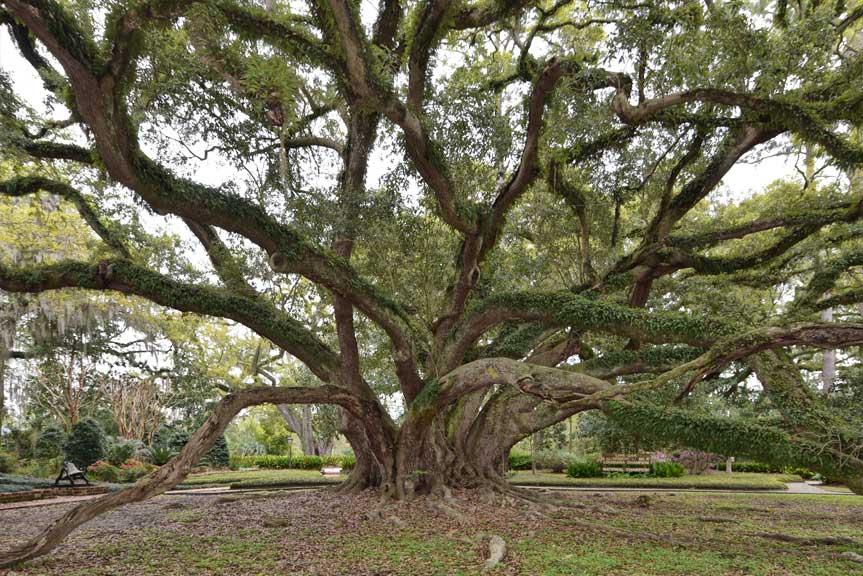
Seven Sisters Oak, Live Oak Society President and former National Big Tree Champion, Quercus virginiana category

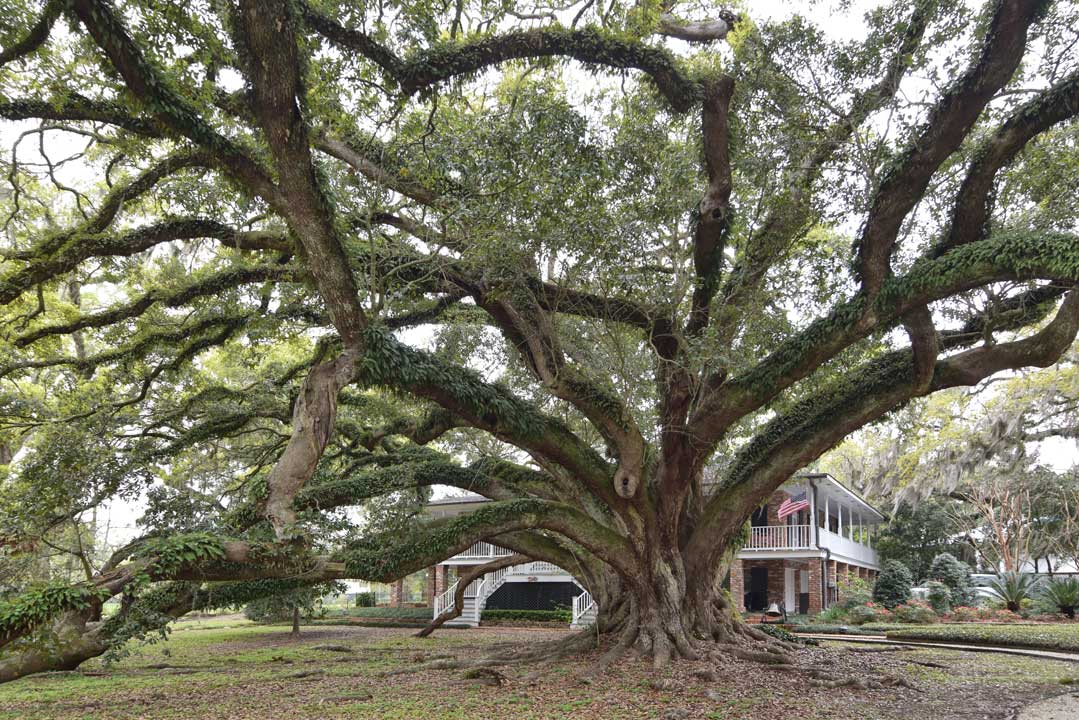
Seven Sisters Oak, view from east side of tree toward home of current owners.

Seven Sisters Oak, located in Mandeville, Louisiana, is the largest registered southern live oak. The tree was originally registered at the Live Oak Society as "Doby's Seven Sisters" (No. 200) because the Doby family owned the property where the tree was located and Mrs. Doby was one of seven sisters. The tree was renamed "Seven Sisters Oak" and reregistered at the Live Oak Society as member number 697. Seven Sisters Oak is the current president of the Live Oak Society, a status awarded to it by being the largest live oak registered by the society. Although there was some controversy as to whether the oak was one tree or several trees that had grown together, an inspection by professional foresters in 1976 determined that the tree developed from a single root system.

In 2016, Seven Sisters Oak had a girth of 39.6 ft (12.1 m) (measured at 1.6 ft (0.49 m) height). At that time, the tree's total height was 57 ft (17 m). In 2018, its limb spread exceeded 153 ft (47 m). The age of Seven Sisters Oak has been estimated at between 500 and 1,000 years old.

== See also ==
- List of individual trees
