= Duffie Oak =

Historic Southern live oak tree

Duffee Oak
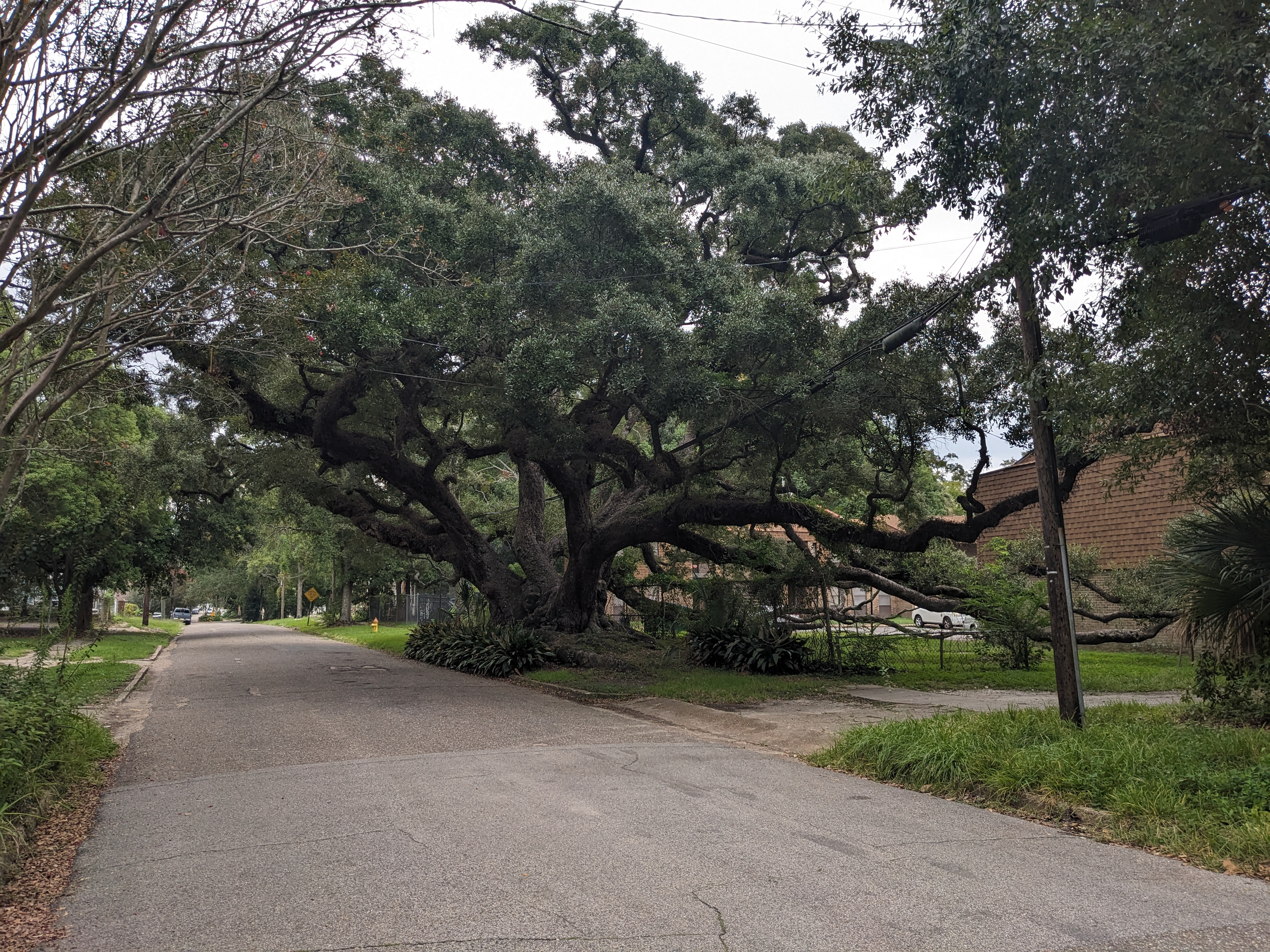
- The Duffee Oak in 2023

- Location within Alabama Location within the United States
- Species: Southern live oak (Quercus virginiana)
- Location: Mobile, Alabama
- Coordinates: 30.68608°N 88.06202°W

The Duffee Oak is a historic southern live oak in Mobile, Alabama. Being approximately 300 years old, it is considered by scholars to be the oldest living landmark in the city. It was originally known as the Seven Sisters Oak for its number of large limbs. It was later renamed for former mayor of Mobile George A. Duffee, who lived nearby.

The tree has a circumference at breast height (CBH) of 30 feet 11 inches (9.42 m), a height of 48 feet (15 m) and a limb spread of 126 feet (38 m). It was recognized by the National Arborist Association in 1977. The Alabama Forestry Commission recognized it as a famous and historic tree in 2003.

== See also ==
- Boyington Oak
- List of individual trees
