= Church Street Graveyard =

Cemetery in Mobile, Alabama, US

Coordinates: 30°41′09″N 88°03′03″W

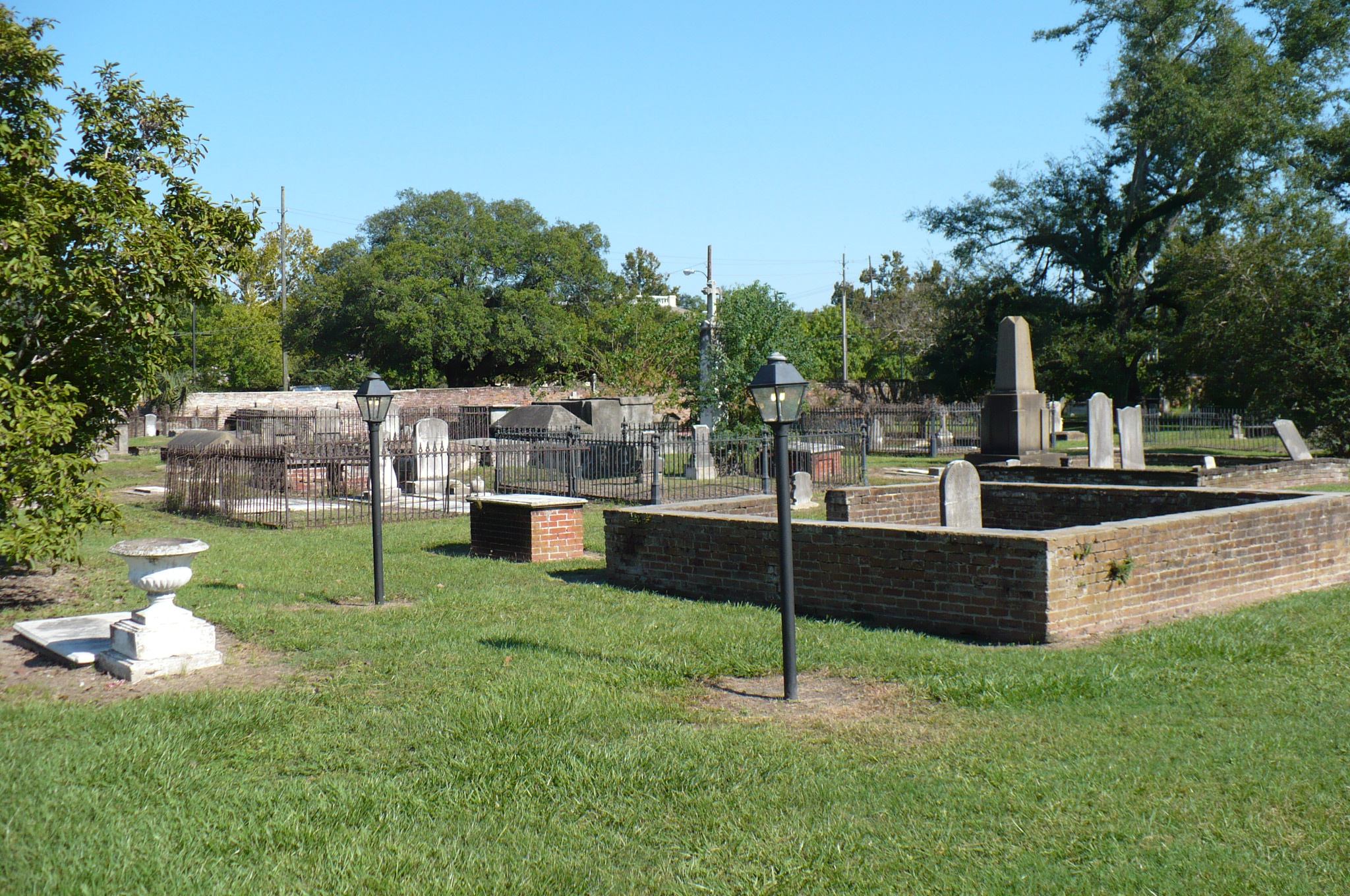
- A view within Church Street Graveyard.
- Interactive map of Church Street Graveyard

Details
- Established: 1819
- Location: Mobile, Alabama
- Country: United States
- Owned by: City of Mobile
- Size: 4 acres (1.6 ha)
- Find a Grave: Church Street Graveyard

Church Street Graveyard is a historic city cemetery located in Mobile, Alabama. The cemetery is situated on 4 acres (1.6 ha) and is surrounded by a brick wall that dates back to 1830. At the time the cemetery was established, it lay about a half-mile away from most development, but it is now considered to be downtown.

== History ==
Church Street Graveyard was founded in 1819, replacing Campo Santo, located at the site of the present Cathedral of the Immaculate Conception as the city's main place of burial. The new cemetery was not officially acquired from local landowner William E. Kennedy by the city of Mobile until a year later, in 1820. Mobile's city officials divided the cemetery into three sections. The northeastern third was designated for Catholics, the southeastern third for Protestants, and the remaining western portion was a "graveyard for strangers". Masons, Odd Fellows, veterans, and the indigent incidentally came to be interred in this western section. The cemetery was closed to burial in 1898, though a few modern burials have taken place by special city resolution.

== Notable monuments and interments ==
Many of the gravestones at Church Street Graveyard are significant examples of stone carving work done in New England and the Gulf Coast in the early 19th century. The cemetery also contains early examples of wrought and cast iron work.

The more notable interments include:

- Charles R.S. Boyington, convicted of the murder of Nathaniel Frost. Reportedly buried beneath the Boyington Oak just outside the graveyard walls.
- Joe Cain, important figure in the history of Mardi Gras in the city.
- Colonel Jean-Jerome Cluis, a Napoleonic refugee and member of the ill-fated Vine and Olive Colony.
- Dominique Louis Dolive, an early French settler.
- Don Miguel Eslava, an early Spanish official.
- Gen. Edmund Pendleton Gaines, a hero of the War of 1812.
- Mary Josephine Hollinger, a native of British colonial Mobile.
- James Roper, builder of Oakleigh.
- Eugene Walter, actor and author.
- Julian Lee Rayford, author and folklorist.

== Gallery ==
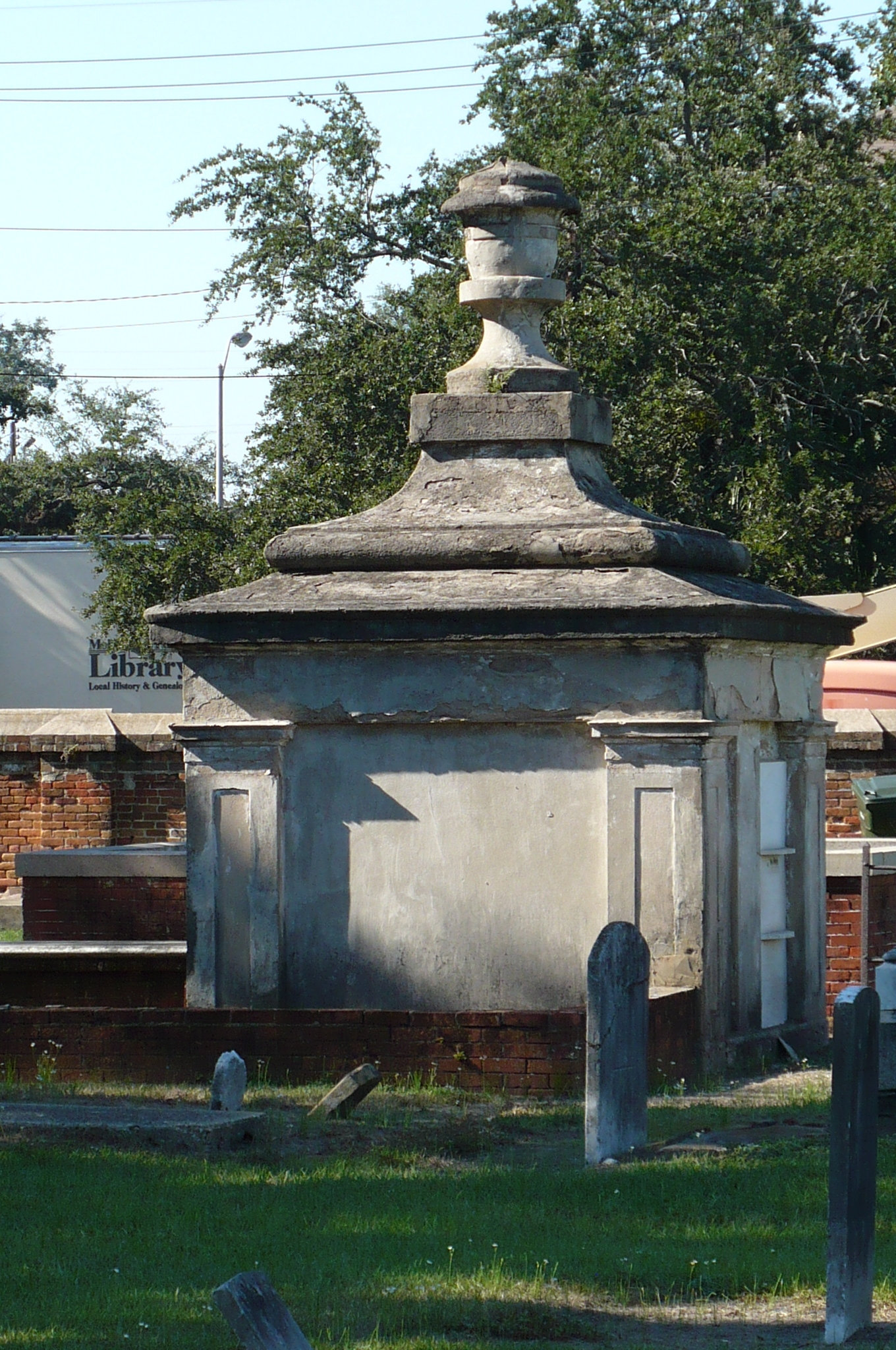
A tomb in Church Street Graveyard.

Grave of Joe Cain, founder of modern Mardi Gras.

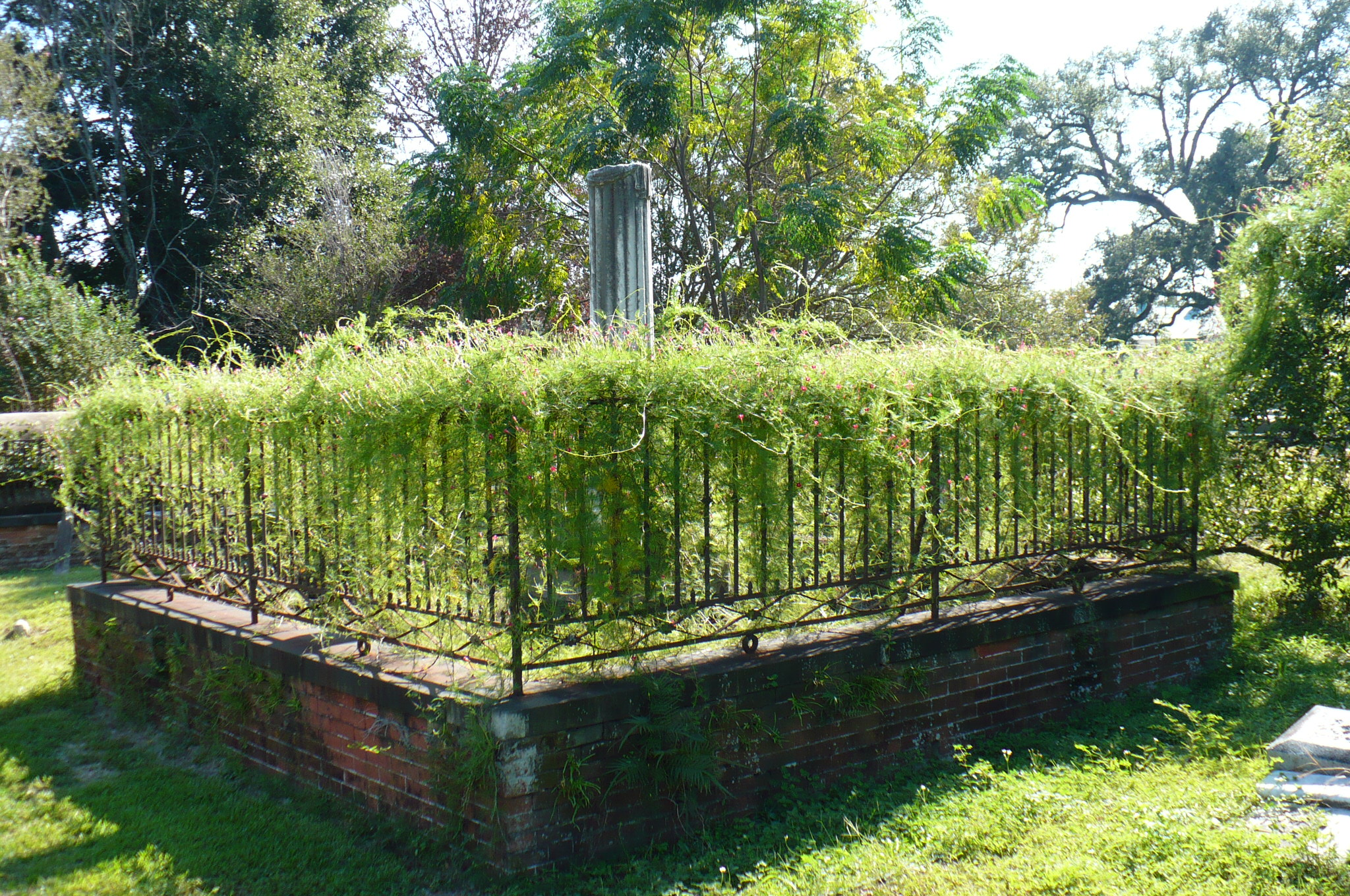
An example of iron work in Church Street Graveyard.

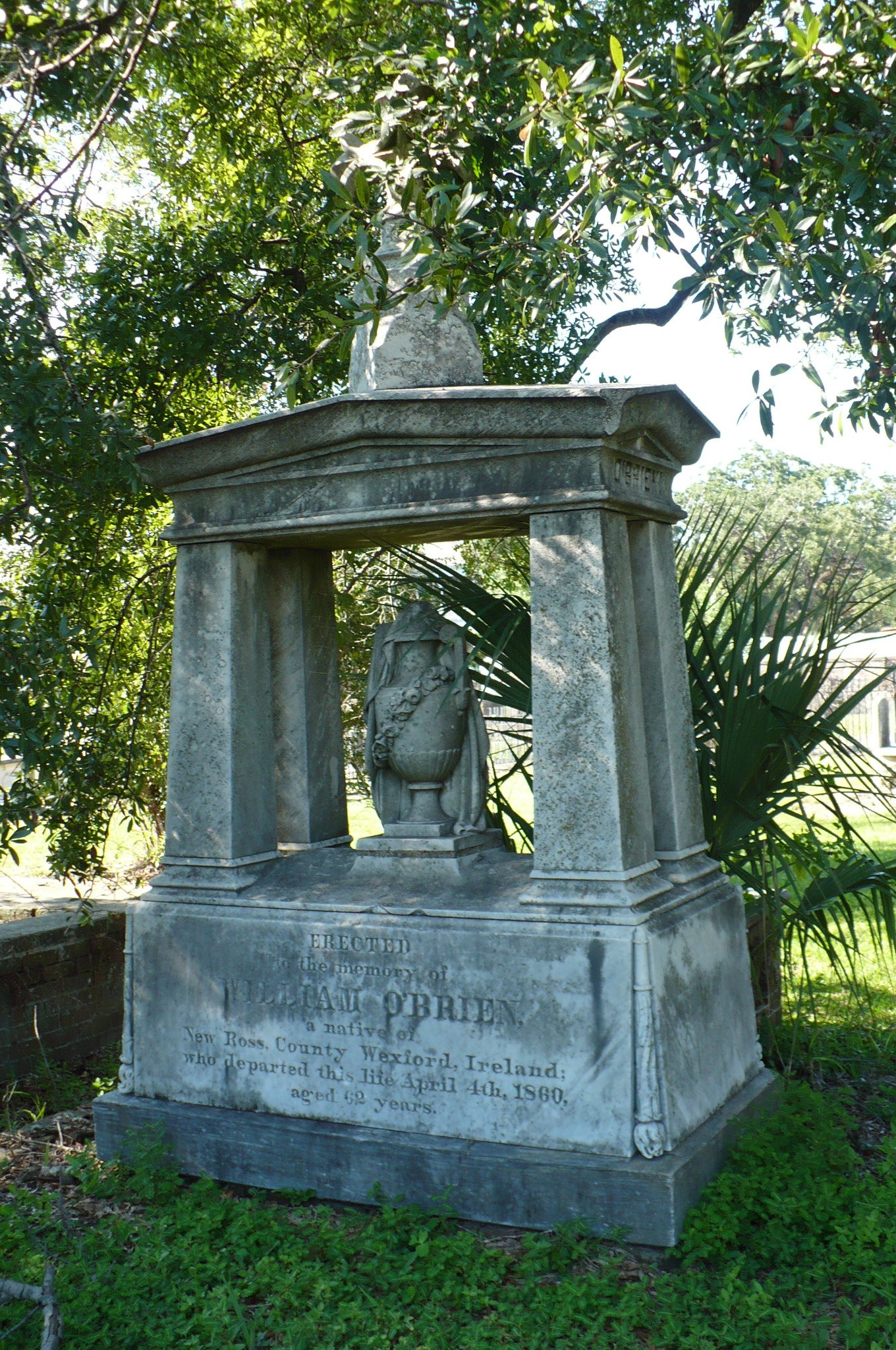
A sculptural tombstone in Church Street Graveyard.
