= Friendship Oak =

Large oak tree in Long Beach, Mississippi

Coordinates: 30°21′06.37″N 89°08′09.94″W

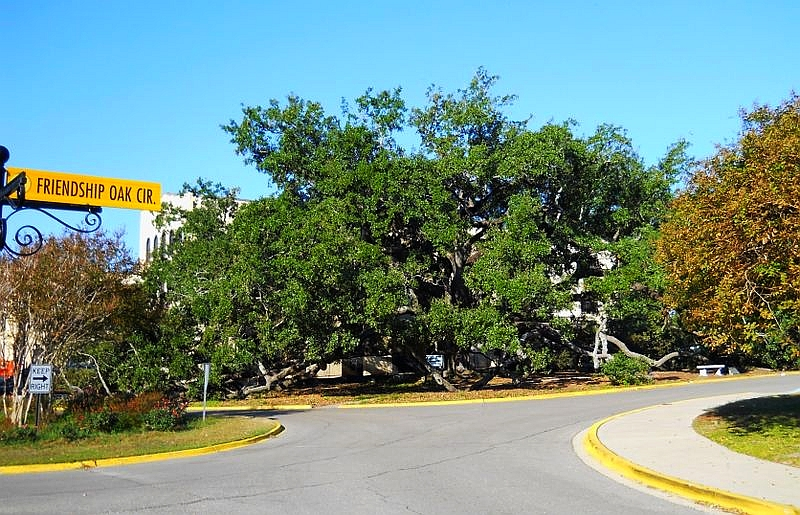
Friendship Oak on the Gulf Park campus of the University of Southern Mississippi, Long Beach, Mississippi, October 2011

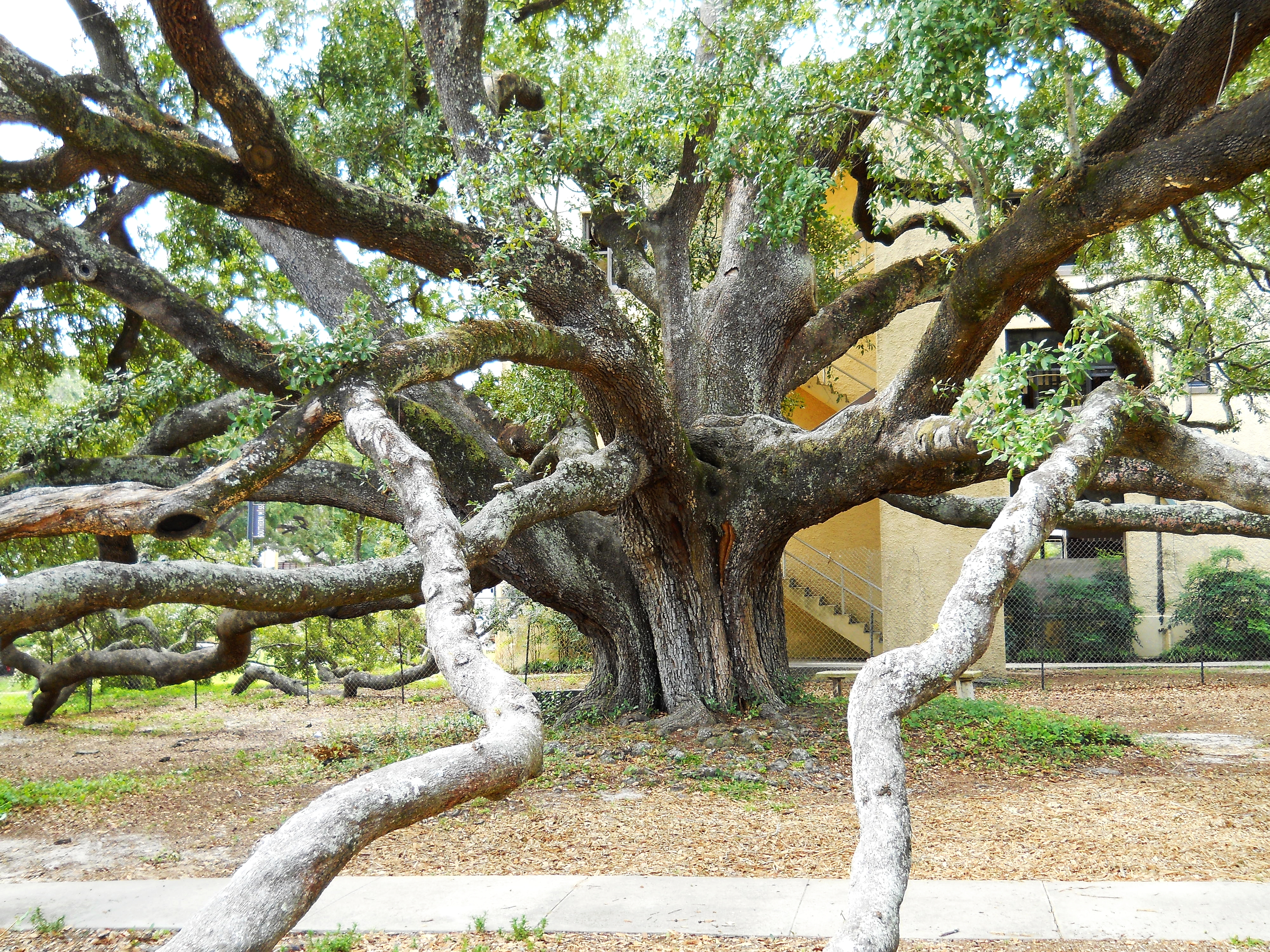
Friendship Oak has massive, downward sweeping limbs that are typical of Quercus virginiana

Friendship Oak is a 500-year-old southern live oak (Quercus virginiana) located on the Gulf Park campus of the University of Southern Mississippi in Long Beach, Mississippi. The campus was formerly Gulf Park College for Women from 1921 until 1971.

== History and folklore ==
Friendship Oak dates from the year 1487, and was a sapling at the time that Christopher Columbus first visited the New World. According to legend, those who enter the shade of its branches will remain friends for all their lives.

In the 1920s, poet Vachel Lindsay taught at Gulf Park College for Women and read poetry to students beneath the branches of Friendship Oak.

Friendship Oak was the 110th tree to be registered with the Live Oak Society. At the time of registration (circa 1940), the tree's trunk circumference was 14 feet (4.3 m).

In 1950, the oak was featured in a Life magazine article about Gulf Park College, where students attended classes under the tree.

In 2024, the coast campus was approved for a sidewalk grant from the Mississippi Department of Transportation. The grant allows for a dedicated parking space and sidewalk to the Friendship Oak. A natural boundary is created to encourage pollinators to come to the area.

== Tree measurements ==
On August 22, 2011, staff from the Mississippi Forestry Commission took the following measurements on Friendship Oak:

- The tree was 59 feet (18 m) in height with a trunk diameter of 5.75 feet (1.75 m).
- The circumference of the trunk was 19.8 feet (6.0 m), and the crown spread was 155 feet (47 m).
- The average length of the main lateral limbs was 60 feet (18 m) from the trunk with an average circumference of 7.5 feet (2.3 m) for the limbs at the trunk.
- The tree's crown covered approximately 16,000 square feet (1486 square meters), and lateral roots extended 150 feet (45.7 m).

In August 2017, one of the main limbs on Friendship Oak broke due to the weight of new growth and heavy rain. The tree's health was subsequently assessed by a certified arborist, and the failed limb was removed in October 2017. Remediation work included some pruning plus installation of bracing to support other limbs.

== Cultural legacy ==
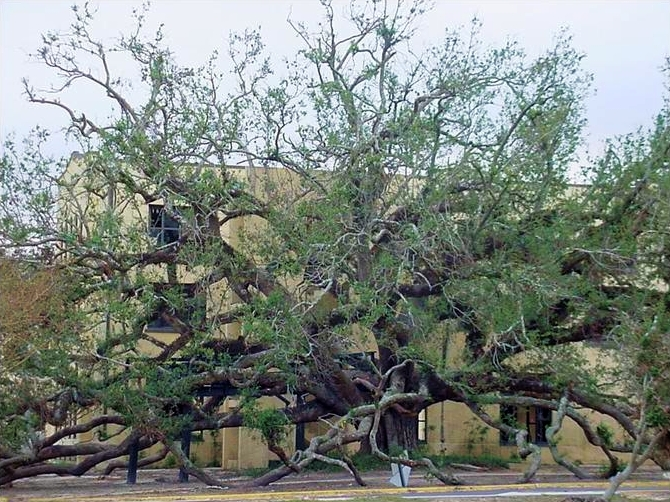
Friendship Oak in December 2005, approximately 3 months after Hurricane Katrina devastated the Mississippi Gulf Coast

Numerous weddings have taken place beneath the branches of the Friendship Oak. Most of the wedding ceremonies have been celebrated by former students of Gulf Park College or the University of Southern Mississippi.

Through the centuries, hurricane winds have defoliated the Friendship Oak and subjected its roots to seawater pushed inland from the Gulf of Mexico as storm surges. At least twice since the mid-1950s, acorns from Friendship Oak have been gathered to produce seedlings for replanting along the Mississippi Gulf Coast to replace live oaks that were destroyed by Hurricanes Camille (1969) and Katrina (2005).

== See also ==
- List of individual trees
