= Eugene Walter =

American writer (1921–1998)

- Born: Eugene Ferdinand Walter, Jr. November 30, 1921; Mobile, Alabama U.S
- Died: March 29, 1998 (aged 76); Mobile, Alabama U.S
- Occupations: Actor; screenwriter; editor; poet

Eugene Ferdinand Walter Jr. (November 30, 1921 – March 29, 1998) was an American screenwriter, poet, short-story author, actor, puppeteer, gourmet chef, cryptographer, translator, editor, costume designer and well-known raconteur. During his years in Paris, he was nicknamed Tum-te-tum. His friend Pat Conroy observed that Walter had lived a "pixilated wonderland of a life." Walter was labeled "Mobile's Renaissance Man" because of his diverse activities in many areas of the arts. Throughout his life, he maintained a connection with Mobile by carrying a shoebox of Alabama red clay around Europe.

== Biography ==
=== Youth ===
Walter was born and raised in Mobile, Alabama, which he described as "a separate kingdom. We are not North America; we are North Haiti." He claimed that he ran away from home at the age of three and was raised by his paternal grandparents. He and Truman Capote became acquainted in Mobile, attending matinees at the Saenger Theatre downtown together as children. His grandparents both died while he was about ten years old. After largely living on the streets for a time, he was eventually taken in by Hammond Bokenham Gayfer, heir to Gayfers Department Store in downtown Mobile. Gayfer died in 1938, again leaving Walter to fend for himself.

=== Adulthood ===
Taken during his time in Paris

During World War II, Walter spent three years in the Aleutian Islands as an Army cryptographer. He relocated to New York City afterward and became a resident of Greenwich Village during the post-WWII years. During this time he pioneered an early form of happening by staging a spontaneous and unannounced group performance with his friends in the sculpture garden of the Museum of Modern Art.

Walter then gained transatlantic passage of a freighter carrying ice cream to Europe during the late 1940s. He lived in Paris during much of the 1950s, where he helped launch the Paris Review, living across the street from the publication's office and contributing to the earliest issues with text, art and interviews. His short story "Troubador" appeared in the first issue. His Paris Review interviews included Isak Dinesen and Robert Penn Warren. In 1960, for Transatlantic Review, he interviewed Gore Vidal. Eventually, Walter moved from Paris to Rome at the request of Marguerite Caetani, Princess di Bassiano, to edit her literary journal Botteghe Oscure.

After a falling out with the princess, he acted in the films of Federico Fellini and translated Italian films into English. His dinner parties in Rome became much talked about; those that attended included T. S. Eliot, William Faulkner, Judy Garland, Anaïs Nin, Leontyne Price, Gore Vidal and Richard Wright. Walter returned to Mobile in 1979.

=== Death ===
He died on March 29, 1998, of liver cancer at the University of South Alabama Medical Center. Practically destitute at the time of his death, his friends raised the money for his sendoff. His wake was held at the old Scottish Rite Temple, where attendees painted and wrote their goodbyes on his closed casket. His funeral service was held at the nearby Cathedral of the Immaculate Conception, followed by a jazz funeral procession in the rain to his final resting place in Mobile's historic Church Street Graveyard. A special allowance was made by the Mobile Parks Department for his burial at Church Street Graveyard, which had been closed since the 1890s.

== Films ==
Living in Rome during the 1960s and 1970s, Walter was a translator for Federico Fellini. For different film companies, he translated hundreds of scripts. He appeared as an actor in more than 20 feature films, notably as the American journalist in Fellini's 8½ (1963). For Fellini's Juliet of the Spirits (1965), he played the role of the Mother Superior and collaborated with Nino Rota on the song, "Go Milk the Moon" (cut from the final version of the film). Rota and Walter teamed again for the song "What Is a Youth" for Franco Zeffirelli's Romeo and Juliet (1968). He also played the role of the priest in The House with Laughing Windows.

Year	Title	Role	Notes
1962	Two Weeks in Another Town		Uncredited
1962	Eighteen in the Sun	Twist dancer	Uncredited
1963	8½	Il giornalista americano	
1963	The Pink Panther	Hotel Manager	Voice, Uncredited
1965	Juliet of the Spirits	Mother Superior	Uncredited
1966	Pardon, Are You For or Against?	Igor	
1968	Django, Prepare a Coffin	Spokesman	Uncredited
1968	The Belle Starr Story	Dita di Velluto	
1968	Hate Thy Neighbor	Judge	Uncredited
1968	The Black Sheep	Mons. Faldella	
1969	Colpo di stato	Ernest Dimler	
1969	Normal Young Man	Nelson	
1970	Ma chi t'ha dato la patente?		
1970	The Swinging Confessors		Uncredited
1970	Amore formula 2	Wolf Baitinger	
1971	Black Belly of the Tarantula	Ginetto, the waiter	
1972	Beati i ricchi	Sindaco	
1973	Sinbad and the Caliph of Baghdad	Zenebi	
1973	The Sensual Man	Jacomini	
1973	Ancora una volta prima di lasciarci	Macpherson	
1974	Erotomania		
1975	Private Lessons	Uncle of Emanuela	Uncredited
1976	The House with Laughing Windows	Don Orsi / Legnani Sister	Uncredited
1976	Tutto suo padre	Stoltz	
1976	Languid Kisses, Wet Caresses	Intellectual	Uncredited
1978	The Pyjama Girl Case	Dorsey	
1978	Per vivere meglio, divertitevi con noi	Nane	(segment "Un incontro molto ravvicinato")
1978	Le braghe del padrone	De Dominicis	
1990	Soultaker	Nun	(final film role)

== Books ==
His books include Monkey Poems (1953), The Byzantine Riddle (1980) and The Untidy Pilgrim (1954), a novel recently reprinted by the University of Alabama Press. He also compiled several cookbooks: Delectable Dishes From Termite Hall (1982) and the bestselling American Cooking: Southern Style, part of Time-Life's Foods of the World series. Hints & Pinches (1991) is an encyclopedic coverage of more than 150 herbs, spices, chutneys and relishes. The Happy Table of Eugene Walter: Southern Spirits in Food and Drink (2011), which Walter described as "an ardent survey of Southern beverages, and how to prepare such, and a grand selection of Southern dishes employing spiritous flavorings," was edited by Donald Goodman (executor of Walter's estate) and Thomas Head and published by the University of North Carolina Press. Dr. Gabrielle Gutting, who teaches literature at Florida Atlantic University, is currently working on a biography of Eugene Walter.

Walter contributed to numerous magazines, including Food Arts, Gourmet, Old Mobile and Harper's Bazaar. His essay "Front Porches" is an evocative portrait of Mobile in 1929:

Old black men with sugarcane stalks over their shoulder would come passing by. Children selling cut flowers, stolen from that morning's funeral wreaths at Magnolia Cemetery. The scissors grinder with his fascinating emery wheel-on-wheels. The pot mender with his bits of lead and solder and strange tools and a spirit lamp. The postman always stopped for a word. Conversations went on, corn was husked, beans hulled or snapped, rice picked over, coffee grounds, beads restrung, paper wicks folded for next winter's fireplaces — somehow a whole world was encompassed, seized, dealt with before noon.

== Awards ==
His literary awards include a Rockefeller-Sewanee Fellowship, an O. Henry citation, the Lippincott Award for fiction and the Prix Guilloux. After his return to Mobile in 1979, Walter kept on writing, publishing, and promoting the arts and culture. He died in Mobile of liver cancer in 1998. By special resolution of the city of Mobile, Alabama, he was buried in the historic Church Street Graveyard in his hometown.

Katherine Clark began interviewing Walter in 1991 for an oral biography, and Milking the Moon: A Southerner's Story of Life on This Planet was published by Crown on August 21, 2001, three years after Walter's death. Shelved in bookstores during the three weeks prior to 9/11, the book has a paragraph describing reactions to the performance art he staged in the 1940s at the Museum of Modern Art. Yet Walter's words were suddenly synchronistic and eerily prophetic: "You could tell he was the guy who sees a train wreck, or a skyscraper collapse, and he's never got his camera when he needs it."

Jonathan Yardley reviewed Milking the Moon in The Washington Post:

To Katherine Clark, who sat with Walter for four months in the spring and summer of 1991 while he talked into her tape recorder, we owe an incalculable debt. Not merely has she rescued him from manifestly unwarranted oblivion, but she has edited his oral history into a book as amazing as the man itself... Of all the characters whom we meet in these pages, by far the most interesting and endearing is Walter himself. He may have been a minor figure in literary and cinematic circles, but he never had any illusions about his own grandeur, and he was grateful for everything his work and friendships brought him. His curiosity was bottomless, and he followed wherever it led: "I really am like old America: just get up and get in the covered wagon and go three thousand miles because you want fresh air... Most people really don't take chances, you see. They wanted to go. But they didn't have the -- I don't know what it is. It's not courage. It's not ambition. It's cat and monkey spirit. Let's see what's over there. Let's just have a look."

Perhaps all of us harbor, somewhere deep inside, a free spirit yearning to break loose, but few of us have the... whatever... to go ahead and let it do so. Eugene Walter did, and led a life with "more delights than regrets." The story of that life, as told here, is absolutely over-the-top, a treasure, a wholly unexpected surprise. Not since John Kennedy Toole's A Confederacy of Dunces -- another posthumous book by another unknown Southerner -- has a book come from so completely out of the blue to give me so much pleasure.

== Recordings ==
There are two compact disc releases of Walter reading his own works. Rare Bird is a sampler of Walter at his best and includes "The Byzantine Riddle." Monkey Poems is faithful to the 1953 book that is the source. Both CDs feature cover art by Walter. Produced by Charlie Smoke and Barry Little with permission from Walter's estate, these CDs are available from Nomad Productions, Inc.

Eugene Walter: Last of the Bohemians (2008) is a documentary by Waterfront Pictures.

== Listen to ==
- Glen Weston singing the Nino Rota/Eugene Walter song, "What Is a Youth"
- Eugene Walter reading Rare Bird (poems, stories, songs)

== Sources ==
- Walter, Eugene (2001). Milking the Moon: A Southerner's Story of Life on This Planet. as told to Katherine Clark. New York: Crown. ISBN 0-609-80965-2. Oral biography.
