= Boyington Oak =

Historic oak tree in Mobile, Alabama

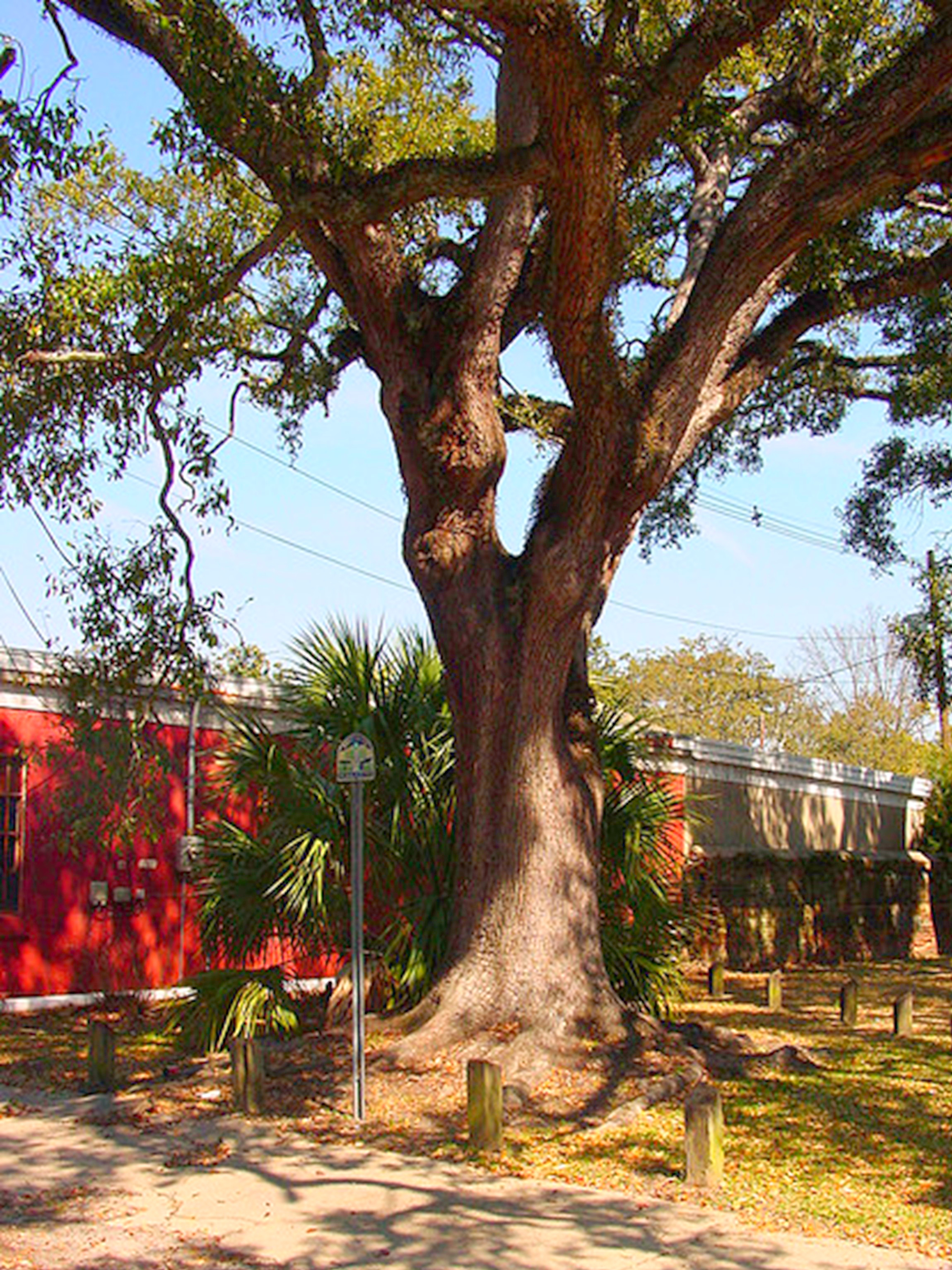
- The Boyington Oak in 2009

- Location within Alabama Location within the United States
- Species: Southern live oak (Quercus virginiana)
- Location: Mobile, Alabama
- Coordinates: 30.68608°N 88.05153°W

The Boyington Oak is a historic southern live oak in Mobile, Alabama. In a city with many live oaks that are famous for their age and size, the Boyington Oak stands out as a singular example of one famous for the folklore surrounding its origin.

== History ==
The story of the Boyington Oak begins with Charles R.S. Boyington, a young printer who arrived in Mobile from Connecticut in 1833. The 1830s were Mobile's years of rapid growth and expansion. Boyington was known to be a frequent gambler, and lived in one of the many boarding houses that dotted the city. On May 11, 1834, Boyington was seen accompanying his friend and roommate Nathaniel Frost, to whom Boyington supposedly owed money, on a walk to Church Street Graveyard on the outskirts of the city. Frost was later found stabbed to death and robbed near the cemetery.

Boyington was the obvious suspect in the murder, but steadfastly professed his innocence even after he was found guilty of the crime. He was executed on February 20, 1835 for the murder of Frost and buried in the northwestern corner of Church Street Graveyard, in the potter's field section. Prior to being hanged, Boyington reportedly stated that a mighty oak tree would spring from his heart as proof of his innocence. An oak tree did eventually grow from the grave. Although the grave and tree were originally inside the brick wall surrounding the cemetery, the wall was moved back from this section shortly after the turn of the 20th century. Today the Boyington Oak stands just outside the cemetery wall, on the edge of Bayou Street.

== Folklore ==
The story of the Boyington Oak has been published numerous times. The story is featured in Kathryn Tucker Windham's Jeffrey's Latest 13: More Alabama Ghosts, John S. Sledge's Cities of Silence, Nelson and Nelson's A History of Church Street Graveyard, and Pruitt and Higgin's "Crime and Punishment in Antebellum Mobile: The Long Story of Charles R. S. Boyington" in the Gulf Coast Historical Review. Ghost stories about the tree claim that visitors have reported hearing crying and whispering sounds emanating from the vicinity of the tree.

== See also ==
- Duffie Oak
- Reportedly haunted locations in Alabama
- List of individual trees
