= Greene–Marston House =

Historic house in Alabama, United States

- U.S. National Register of Historic Places
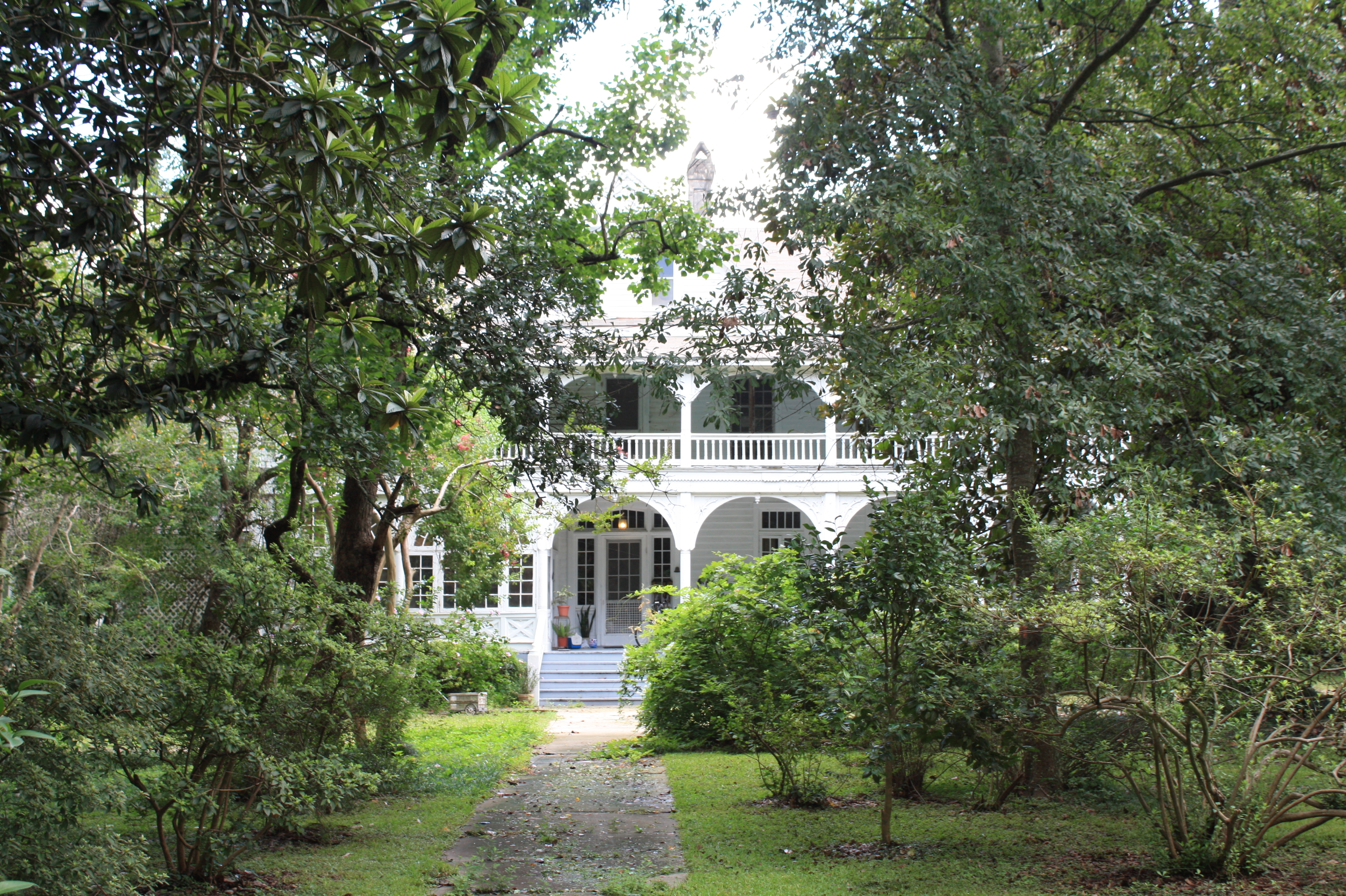

- Location within Mobile, Alabama Location within Alabama Location within the United States
- Location: 2000 Dauphin St., Mobile, Alabama
- Coordinates: 30°41′12″N 88°5′19″W
- Built: 1851
- Architectural style: Late Victorian
- NRHP reference No.: 83002966
- Added to NRHP: January 11, 1983

The Greene–Marston House (commonly known as Termite Hall) is a historic house in Mobile, Alabama.

== Description and history ==
Construction of the house began in about 1851, with a one-and-a-half-story cottage, built by the Greene family. Martin Van Heuval built a much larger two-and-a-half-story Late Victorian structure in 1903, incorporating the earlier house into the main block as a wing. The house was remodeled again in 1910 by William Syson.

The house was sold to Regina DeMouy Rapier in 1919, after the DeMouy house was destroyed in a fire. Many of her DeMouy, Rapier, and Marston relatives lived in the house during this period. The house gained its name in the early twentieth century from an incident involving the Marston sisters, Adelaide and Eleanor. Family tradition maintains that one evening the children were sitting on a porch rail, and when they got up the rail disintegrated before their eyes. It was discovered that the porch had been infested with termites, from which it acquired its common name.

It became locally renowned as a literary gathering place during the tenancy of Adelaide Caroline Marston Trigg. In 1941, she co-founded Mobile's The Haunted Book Shop. The bookstore became a literary fixture that attracted the likes of Harper Lee, Thomas Mann, Eugene Walter and William March. Several years after selling her interest in The Haunted Book Shop, she operated Far Corners Book Search out of the house.

Adelaide and sister Eleanor were close friends with Eugene Walter. He was renowned as an author, poet, gourmet chef, translator, and friend of Federico Fellini. Walter lived with them on several occasions and featured the house in his 1982 cookbook, Delectable Dishes From Termite Hall. Adelaide Trigg died in 2008 at the age of 89. The novel, In the Hope of Rising Again, was written by Trigg's granddaughter, Helen Scully, and is set in the house. The house has remained in the Marston-Trigg family.

It was added to the National Register of Historic Places on January 11, 1983, due to its architectural significance.
