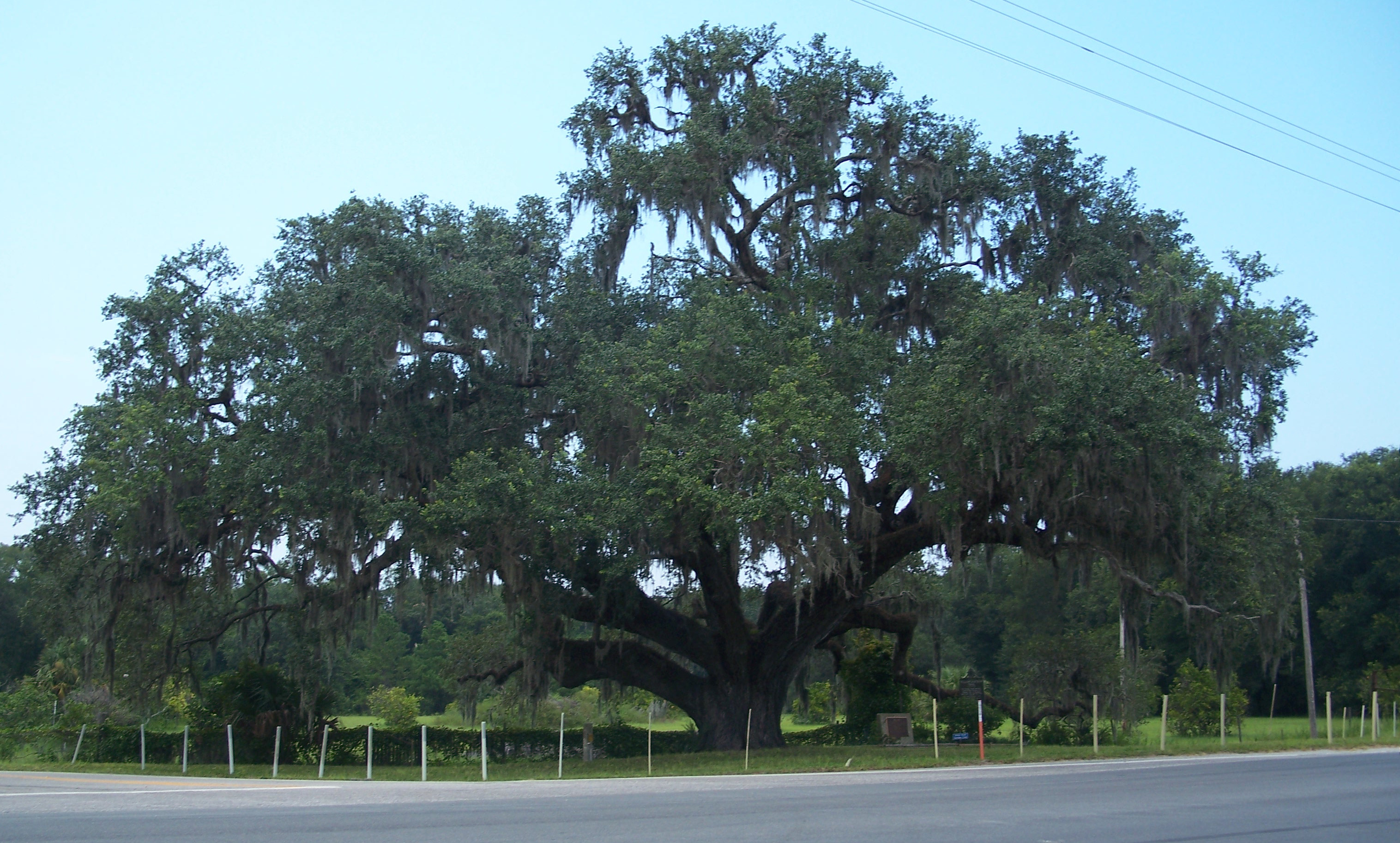
- The Volusia Oak on the St. Johns River in Volusia, Florida.
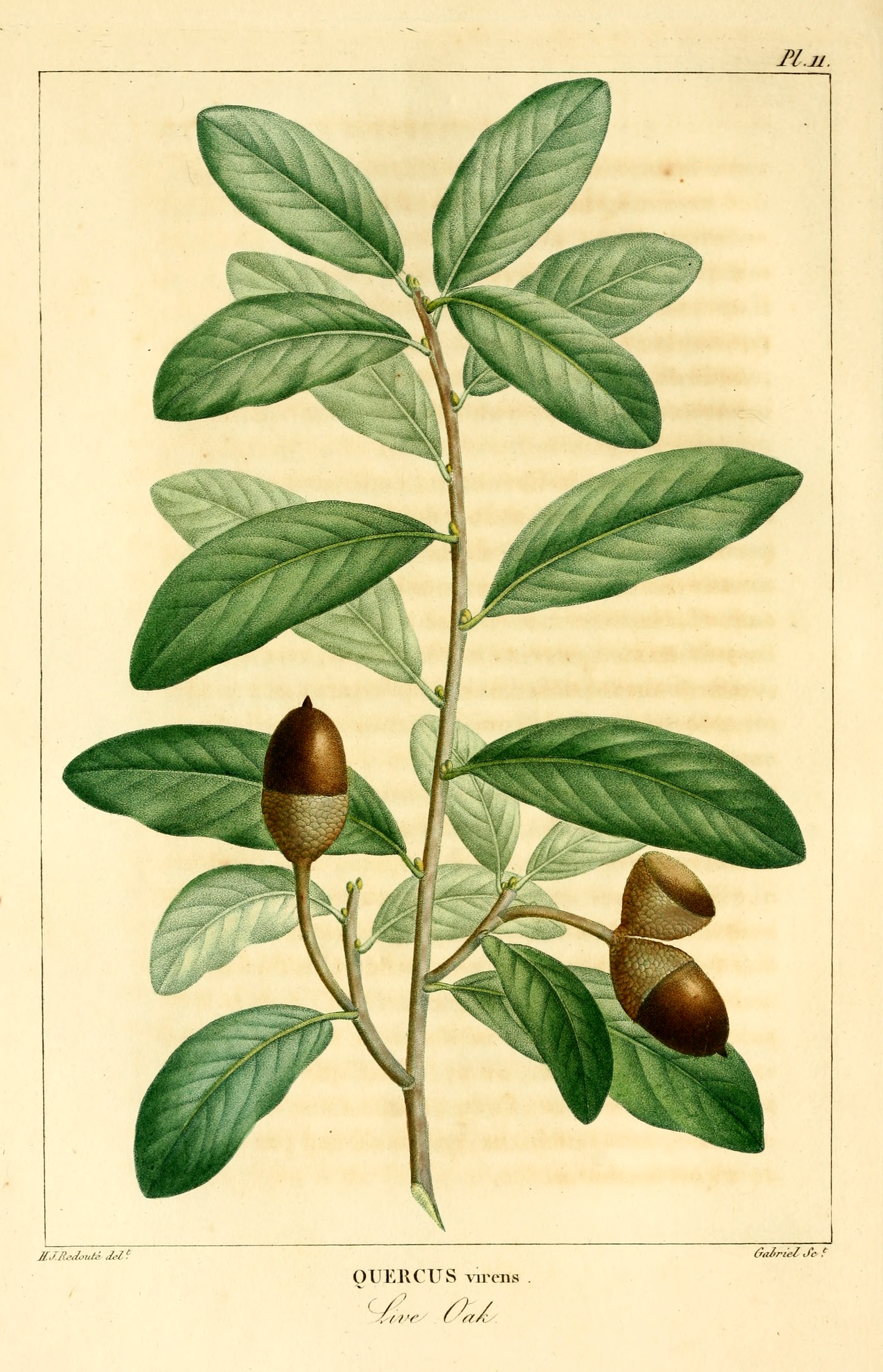
- 1812 illustration

Conservation status
- Least Concern (IUCN 3.1)

Scientific classification
- Kingdom: Plantae
- Clade: Tracheophytes
- Clade: Angiosperms
- Clade: Eudicots
- Clade: Rosids
- Order: Fagales
- Family: Fagaceae
- Genus: Quercus
- Subgenus: Quercus subg. Quercus
- Section: Quercus sect. Virentes
- Species: Q. virginiana

Binomial name
- Quercus virginiana Mill.
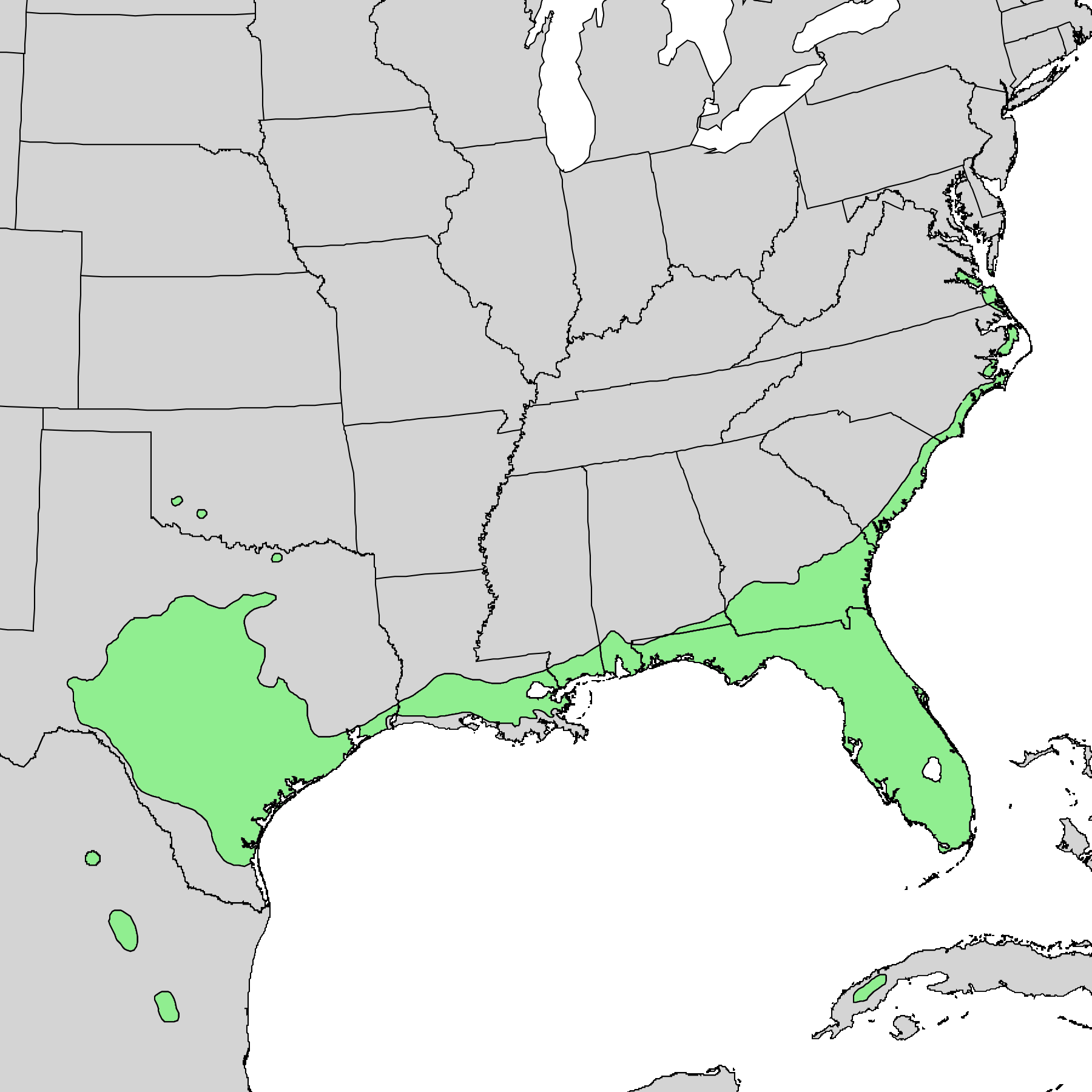

Synonyms
- List: Dryopsila virens (Aiton) Raf.; Quercus andromeda Riddell; Quercus hemisphaerica Endl.; Quercus phellos var. obtusifolia Lam.; Quercus phellos var. sempervirens Marshall; Quercus sempervirens Walter; Quercus virens Aiton; Quercus virginiana var. eximea Sarg.; Quercus virginiana var. virescens Sarg.

= Quercus virginiana =

Southern live oak

Species of oak tree

Quercus virginiana, also known as the southern live oak, is an semi-evergreen oak tree native to the Southeastern United States Coastal Plain. Though many other species are loosely called live oak, the southern live oak is particularly iconic of the Old South. Many very large and old specimens of live oak can be found today in the Deep South region of the United States. Although it does not grow extremely high, it has a massive canopy: the greatest identified extant oak, in St. Tammany Parish, Louisiana, has only a 68 foot (20.7 m) tall trunk, but its arboreal cover spreads over a range of 139 feet (42.4 m).

== Description ==
Although live oaks retain their leaves nearly year-round, they are not true evergreens. Live oaks drop their leaves immediately before new leaves emerge in the spring. Occasionally, senescing leaves may turn yellow or contain brown spots in the winter, leading to the mistaken belief that the tree has oak wilt, whose symptoms typically occur in the summer. A live oak's defoliation may occur sooner in marginal climates or in dry or cold winters.

The bark is dark, thick, and furrowed longitudinally. The leaves are stiff and leathery, with the tops shiny dark green and the bottoms pale gray and very tightly tomentose, simple and typically flattish with bony-opaque margins, with a length of 2–15 centimetres (3/4–6 inches) and a width of 1–5 cm (3/8–2 in), borne alternately. The male flowers are green hanging catkins with lengths of 7.5–10 cm (3–4 in). The acorns are small, 1–2.5 cm (3/8–1 in), oblong in shape (ovoid or oblong-ellipsoid), shiny and tan-brown to nearly black, often black at the tips, and borne singly or in clusters.

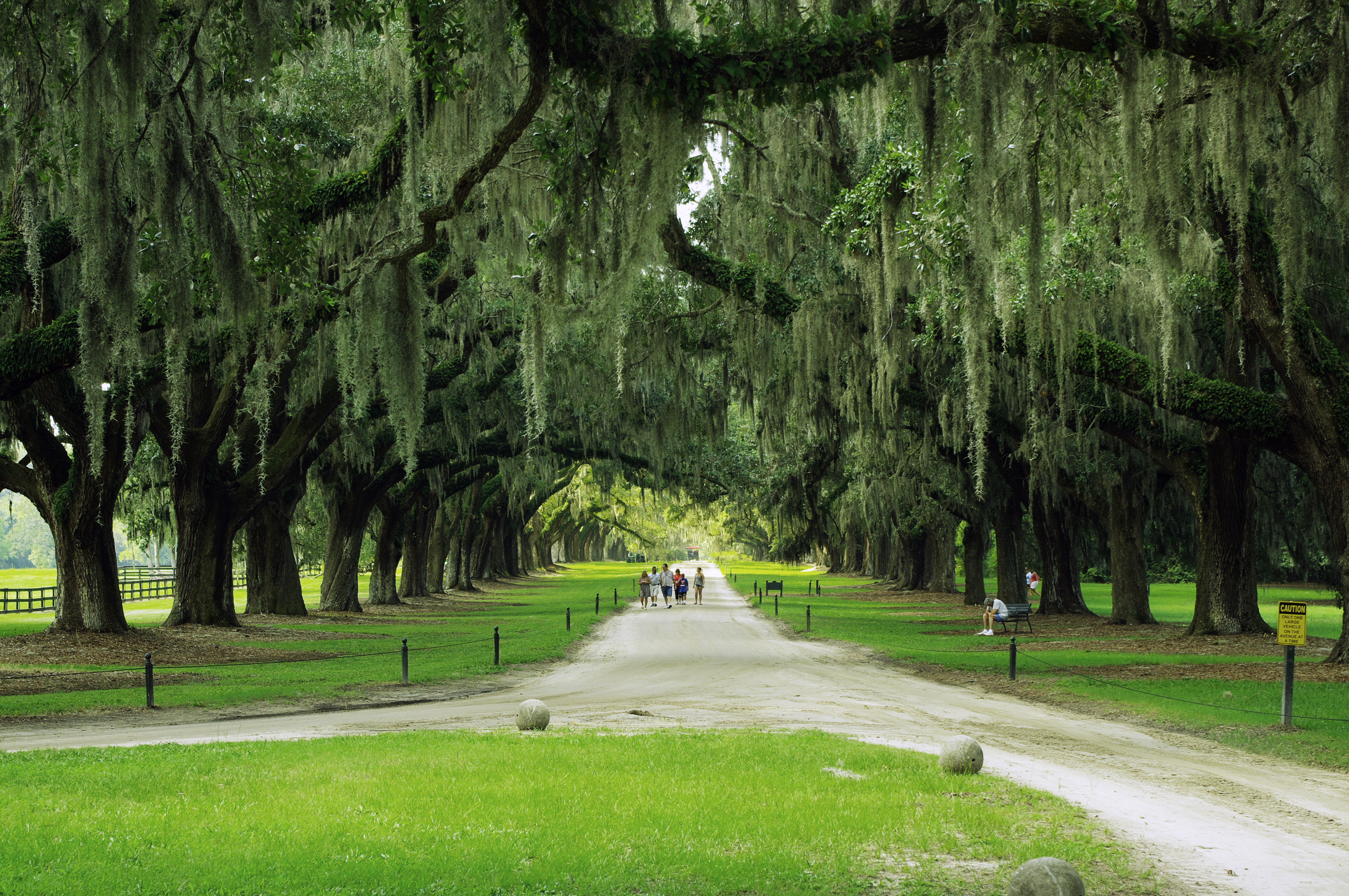
The avenue of live oaks at Boone Hall in Mount Pleasant, South Carolina, planted in 1743.

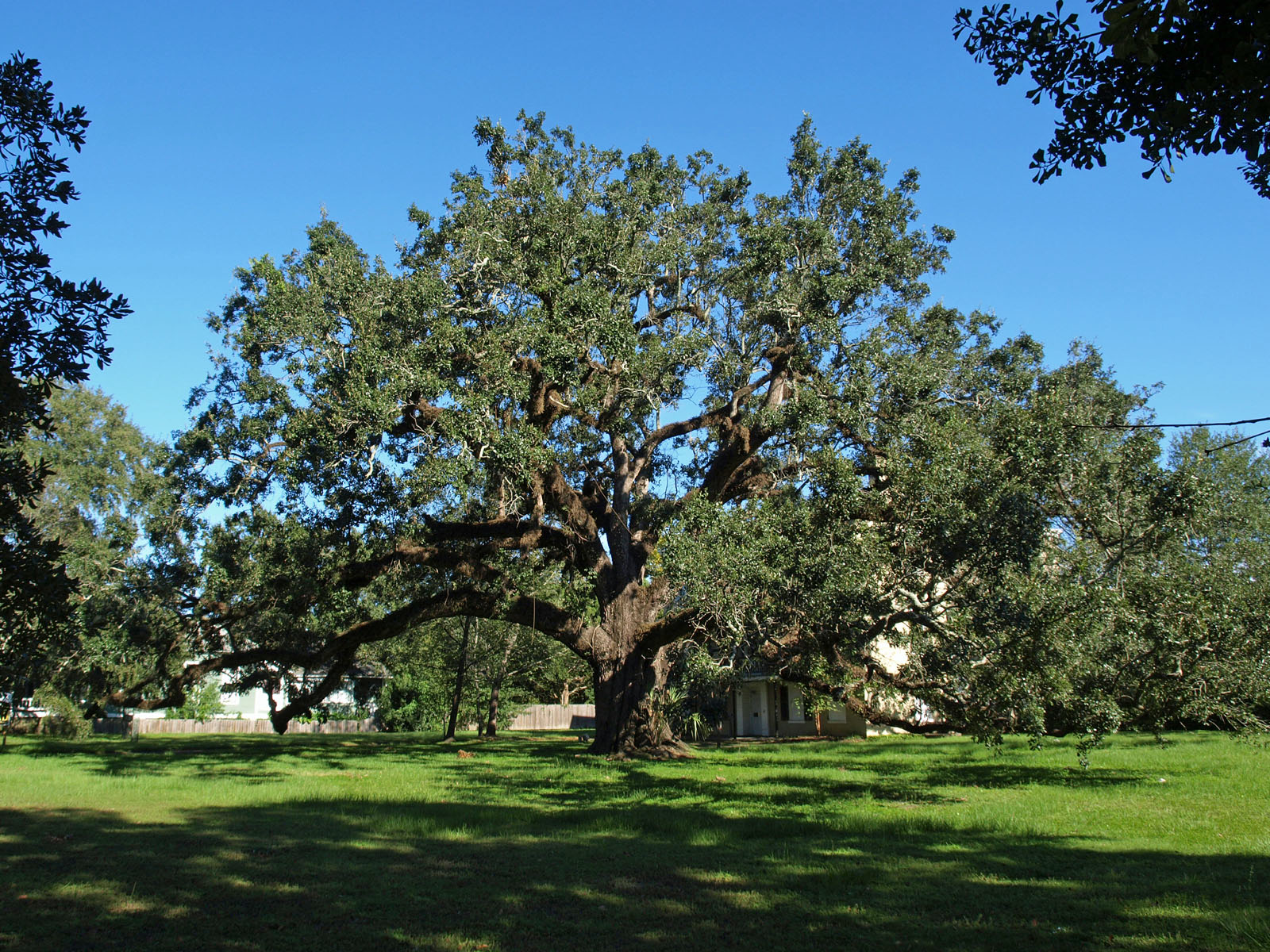
A specimen at the former Protestant Children's Home in Mobile, Alabama. It has a trunk circumference of 7.0 m (23 ft), height of 19 m (63 ft) and limb spread of 43 m (141 ft).

Depending on the growing conditions, live oaks vary from a shrub-size to large and spreading tree-size: typical open-grown trees reach 20 m (66 ft) in height, with a limb spread of nearly 27 m (89 ft). Their lower limbs often sweep down towards the ground before curving up again. They can grow at severe angles; Native Americans used to bend saplings over so that they would grow at extreme angles, to serve as trail markers.

The southern live oak has a deep taproot that anchors it when young and eventually develops into an extensive and widespread root system. This, along with its low center of gravity and other factors, makes the southern live oak extremely resistant to strong sustained winds, such as those seen in hurricanes.

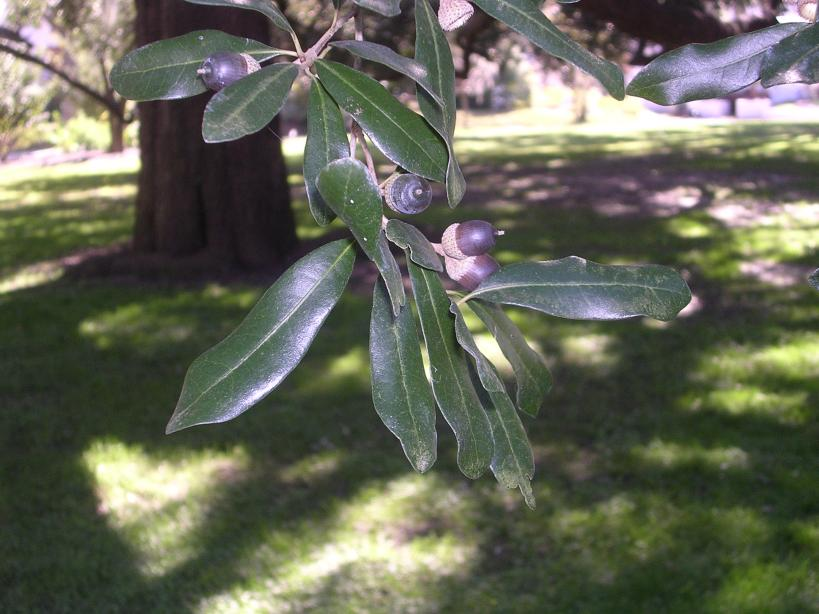
Leaves and acorns

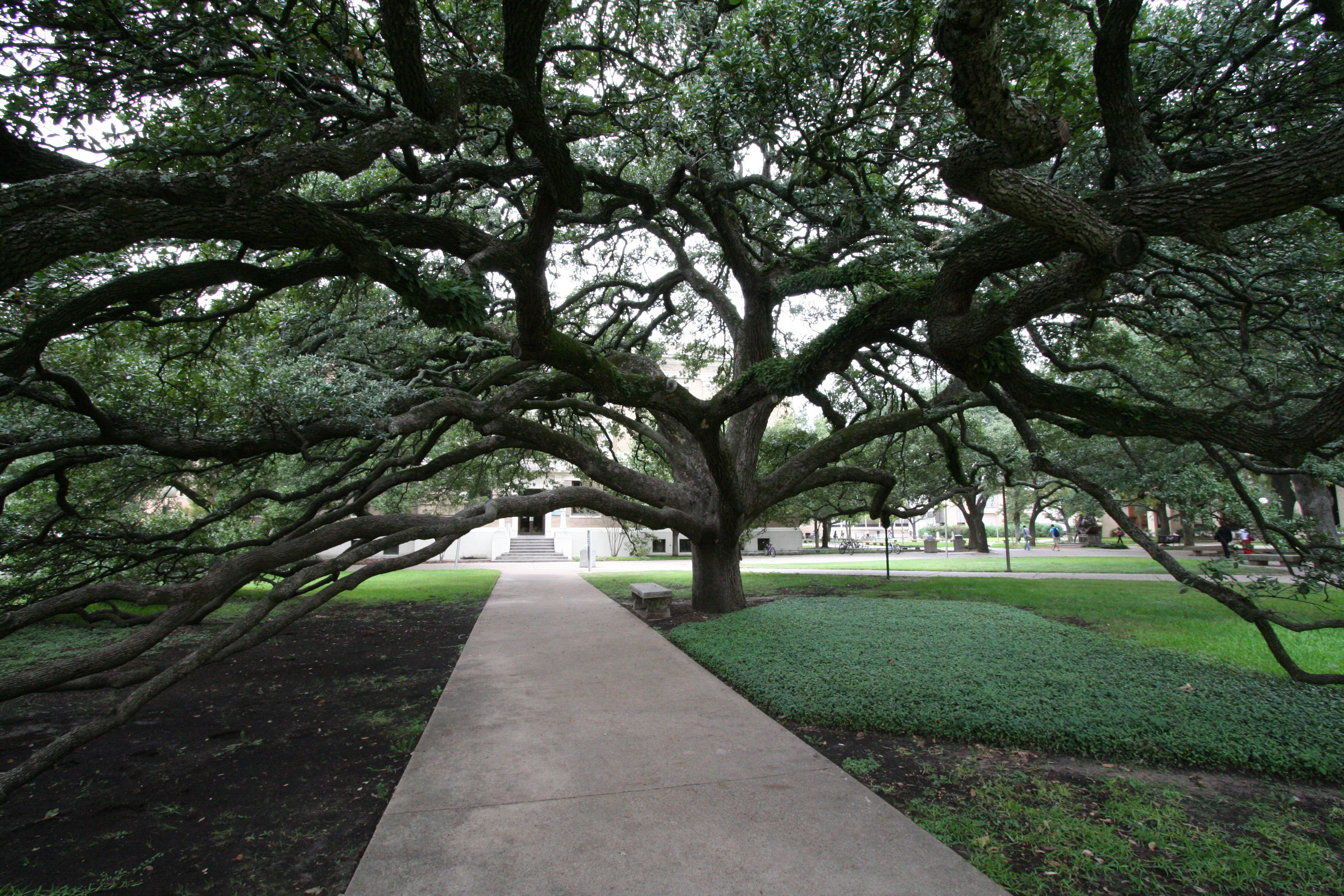
The Century Tree at Texas A&M University in College Station, Texas

== Taxonomy ==
Quercus virginiana is placed in the southern live oaks section of the genus Quercus (section Virentes).

A large number of common names are used for this tree, including "Virginia live oak", "bay live oak", "scrub live oak", "plateau oak", "plateau live oak", "escarpment live oak", and (in Spanish) "roble". It is also often just called "live oak" within its native area, but the full name "southern live oak" helps to distinguish it from other live oaks, a general term for any evergreen species of oak.

This profusion of common names partly reflects an ongoing controversy about the classification of various live oaks, in particular its near relatives. Some authors recognize as distinct species the forms others consider to be varieties of Quercus virginiana. Notably, the following two taxa, treated as species in the Flora of North America, are treated as varieties of southern live oak by the United States Forest Service: the escarpment live oak, Quercus fusiformis (Q. virginiana var. fusiformis) and the sand live oak, Quercus geminata (Q. virginiana var. geminata).

Matters are further complicated by southern live oaks hybridizing with both of the above two species, and also with the dwarf live oak (Q. minima), swamp white oak (Q. bicolor), Durand oak (Q. durandii), overcup oak (Q. lyrata), bur oak (Q. macrocarpa), and post oak (Q. stellata).

== Distribution and habitat ==
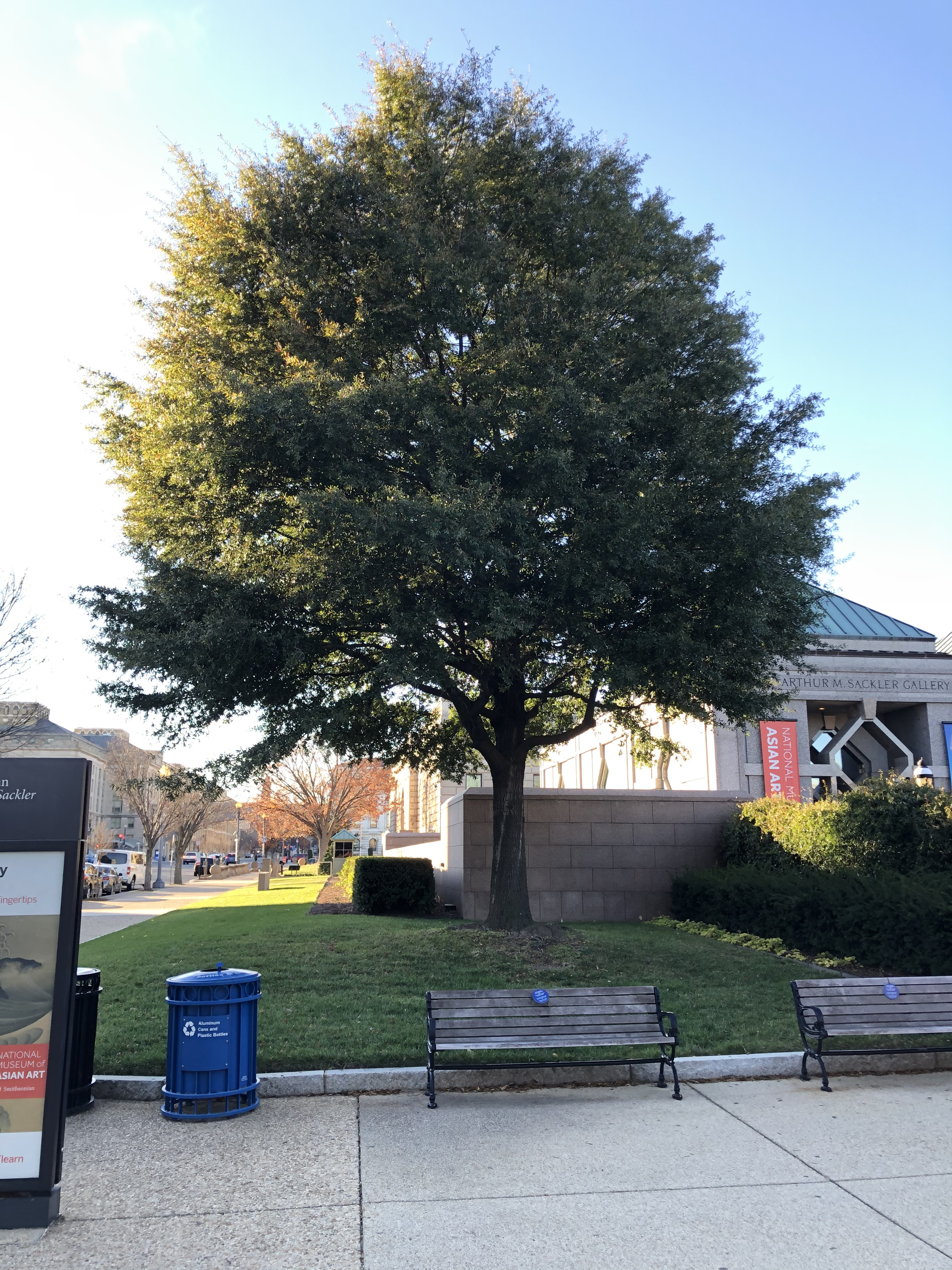
A young Live Oak in Washington, DC, at Smithsonian Institution Building

Live oak can be found in the wild growing and reproducing on the lower coastal plain of the Gulf of Mexico and lower East Coast of the United States. Its native range begins in southeast Virginia, and then continues south in a narrow band through North Carolina along the coast to the interior South Carolina coast, where its range begins to expand farther inland. The range of live oak continues to expand inland as it moves south, growing across southern Georgia and covering all of Florida south to the northernmost Florida Keys. Live oak grows along the Florida panhandle to Mobile Bay, then westward across the southernmost two tiers of counties in Mississippi. Live oak grows across the southern third of Louisiana, except for some barrier islands and scattered parts of the most southern parishes. Live oak's range continues into Texas and narrows to hug the coast until just past Port Lavaca, Texas.

There is a misconception that the southern live oak reaches its northwestern limit in the granite massifs and canyons in Southwestern Oklahoma. However, this actually belongs to the closely related and much more cold-hardy Escarpment Live Oak (Quercus fusiformis), a rare remnant from the last glaciation also found around Norman, Oklahoma.

Along the coastal plain of the Gulf of Mexico and south Atlantic United States, live oak is found in both single and mixed species forests, dotting the savannas, and as occasional clumps in the grasslands along the lower coastal plain. Live oak grows in soils ranging from heavy textures (clay loams), to sands with layers of organic materials or fine particles. Live oak can be found dominating some maritime forests, especially where fire periodicity and duration are limited. Live oak is found on higher topographic sites as well as hammocks in marshes and swamps. In general, southern live oak hugs the coastline and is rarely found more than 90 m (300 ft) above sea level. Live oaks grow across a wide range of sites with many moisture regimes – ranging from dry to moist. Live oak will survive well on both dry sites and in wet areas, effectively handling short duration flooding if water is moving and drainage is good. Good soil drainage is a key resource component for sustained live oak growth. The usual precipitation range is 650–1,650 millimetres (25–65 in) of water per year, preferably in spring and summer. Soil is usually acidic, ranging between pH of 5.5 and 6.5. A live oak on Tyler Avenue in Annapolis, Maryland or one on Cherrywood Lane in Bowie, Maryland is the northernmost known mature specimen, although a number of saplings can be found growing around nearby Towson. Multiple healthy young examples can be found in the Bolton Hill neighborhood of Baltimore.

== Ecology ==
One source states that the southern live oak responds "with vigorous growth to plentiful moisture on well-drained soil." They tend to survive fire, because often a fire will not reach their crowns. Even if a tree is burned, its crowns and roots usually survive the fire and sprout vigorously. Furthermore, live oak forests discourage entry of fire from adjacent communities because they provide dense cover that discourages the growth of a flammable understory. They can withstand occasional floods and hurricanes, and are resistant to salt spray and moderate soil salinity. Although they grow best in well-drained sandy soils and loams, they will also grow in clay.

The branches frequently support other plant species such as rounded clumps of ball moss (Tillandsia recurvata), thick drapings of Spanish moss (Tillandsia usneoides), resurrection fern (Pleopeltis polypodioides), and parasitic mistletoe.

== Cultivation ==
Southern live oak is cultivated in warmer climates as a specimen tree or for shade in the southern United States (zone 8 and south), Nuevo León and Tamaulipas states in Mexico, and in the warmer parts of the United States, Europe, and Australia. Cultivation is relatively simple, as southern live oak seedlings grow fast with ample soil moisture. Planting depth has little effect on the success of the tree. After a few years live oak needs only occasional supplemental water. Southern live oak is very long lived, and there are many specimens that are more than 400 years old in the deep southern United States. The southern live oak is reliably hardy to USDA Hardiness Zone 8a, which places its northern limit for long-term cultivation inland around Atlanta, Memphis, and Washington, D.C.

== Uses ==
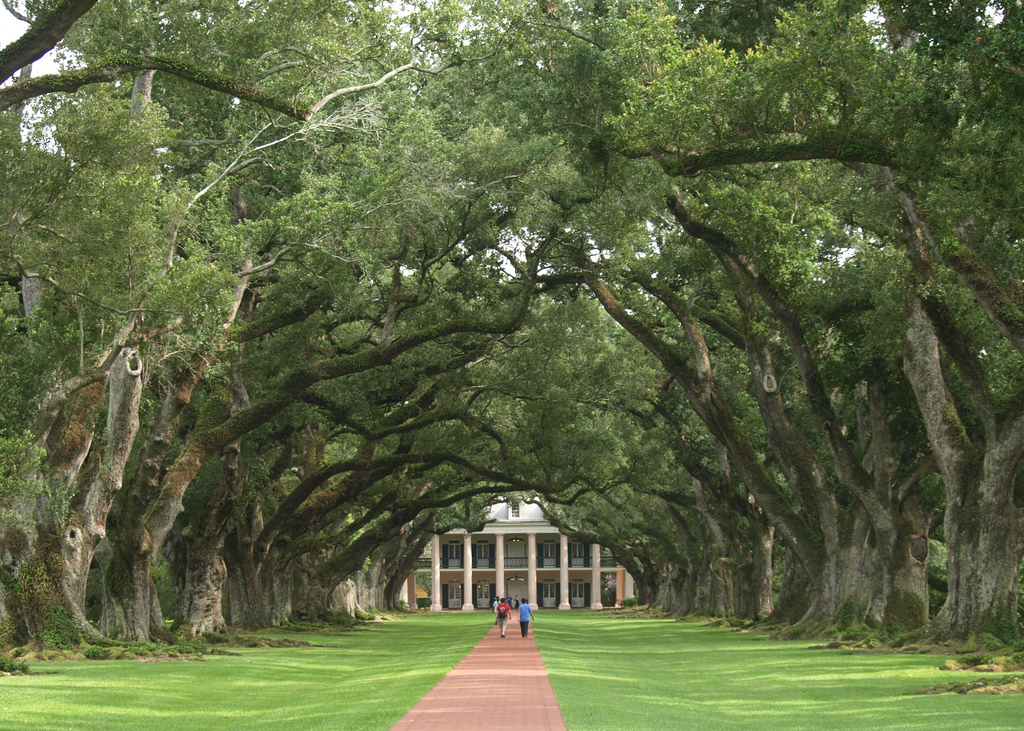
The avenue of live oaks at Oak Alley Plantation in Vacherie, Louisiana, planted in the early 18th century.

Live oak wood is hard, heavy, and difficult to work with, but very strong. In the days of wooden ships, live oaks were the preferred source of the framework timbers of the ship, using the natural trunk and branch angles for their strength. The frame of USS Constitution was constructed from southern live oak wood harvested from St. Simons Island, Georgia, and the density of the wood grain allowed it to survive cannon fire, thus earning her the nickname "Old Ironsides". Even today, the U.S. Navy continues to own extensive live oak tracts.

The primary uses for southern live oaks today are providing food and shelter for wildlife. Among the animals for which live oak acorns are an important food source are the bobwhite quail, the threatened Florida scrub jay, the wood duck, yellow-bellied sapsucker, wild turkey, black bear, various species of squirrel, and the white-tailed deer. The tree crown is very dense, making it valuable for shade, and the species provides nest sites for many mammal species. Native Americans extracted a cooking oil from the acorns, used all parts of live oak for medicinal purposes, leaves for making rugs, and bark for dyes. The roots of seedlings sometimes form starchy, edible tubers. People in past centuries harvested and fried these tubers for human consumption much as one might use a potato.

In 1937, the southern live oak was designated the official state tree of Georgia (U.S. state).

== Cultural symbolism ==
The tree is a powerful symbol of the southern United States, evoking steamy summers, with its expansive limbs wrapped in Spanish moss. Landscape designers in the region tend to plant it alongside roads and position it centrally in parks.

== Famous specimens ==
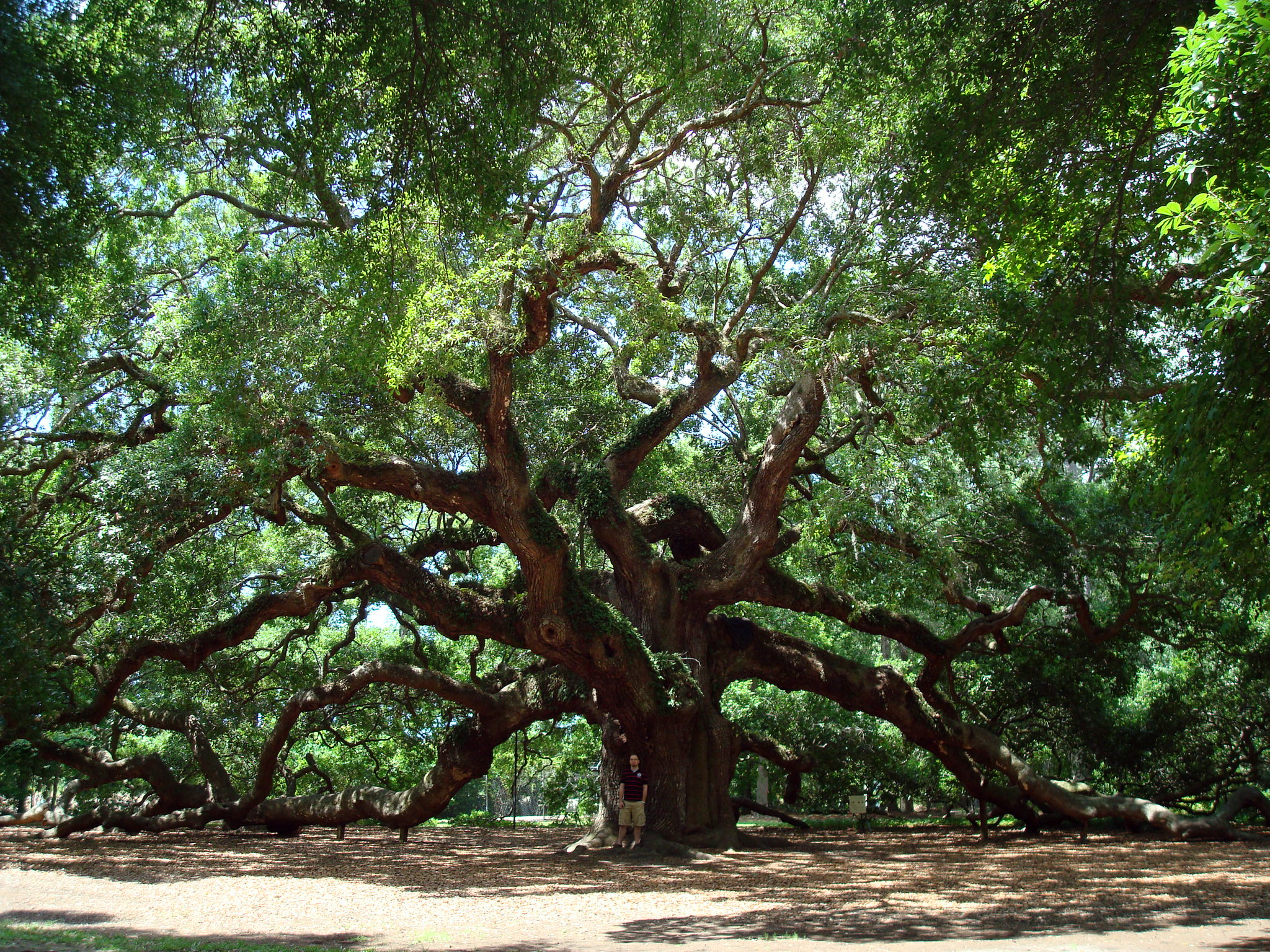
The Angel Oak on Johns Island, South Carolina. The man under the tree is 1.8 m (5 ft 11 in) tall.

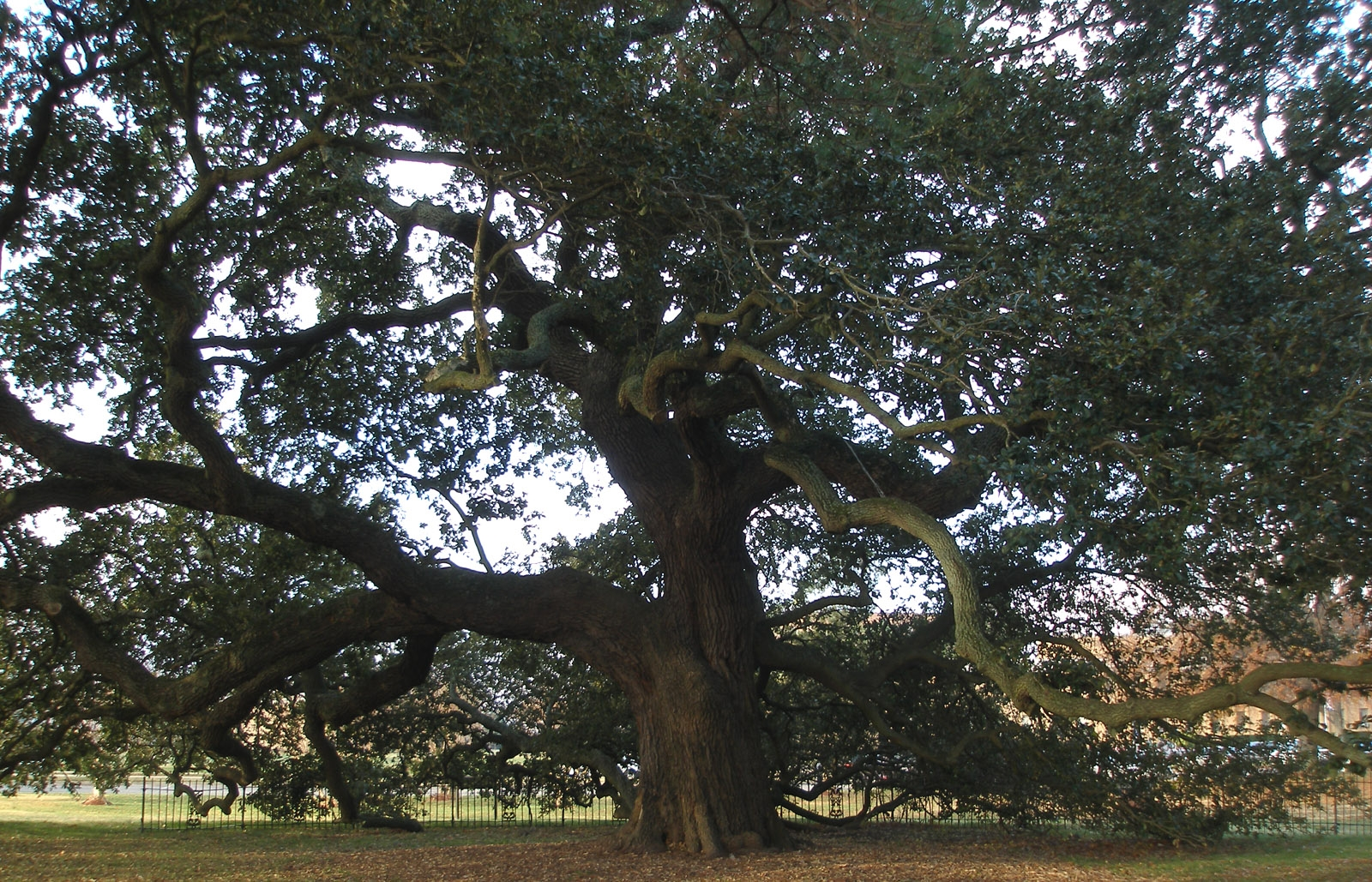
The Emancipation Oak in Hampton, Virginia

- The Seven Sisters Oak, estimated to be between 500 and 1,000 years old, is the largest certified southern live oak tree.
- The Angel Oak on Johns Island, South Carolina, near Charleston is estimated to be 400–500 years old. It has a trunk circumference of 8.5 m (28 ft), height of 20.3 m (66 ft 6 in) and limb spread of 57 m (187 ft).
- The Big Tree is an estimated 1,000-year-old southern live oak located in Rockport, Texas, the largest live oak in Texas.
- The Boyington Oak, an approximately 180-year-old southern live oak in Mobile, Alabama, that is known for the folklore surrounding its origin.
- The Cellon Oak, with a circumference of 9 m (30 ft), a height of 26 m (85 ft), and an average crown spread of 49 m (160 ft), is the largest recorded live oak tree in Florida. It is used as the logo of Alachua County, Florida.
- The Duffie Oak, a more than 300-year-old southern live oak in Mobile, Alabama, has a trunk circumference of 9.42 m (30 ft 11 in), height of 15 m (48 ft) and limb spread of 38 m (126 ft). It is the oldest living landmark in the city.
- The Emancipation Oak, on the campus of Hampton University in Virginia, is listed as one of the "Ten Great Trees of the World" by the National Geographic Society.
- The Century Tree (photo), planted in 1891 on the campus of Texas A&M University in College Station, Texas, is a campus landmark and has been declared a Famous Tree of Texas by the Texas Forest Service.
- The Evangeline Oak in St. Martinville, Louisiana
- The Friendship Oak is a 500-year-old southern live oak located on the Gulf Park campus of the University of Southern Mississippi in Long Beach, Mississippi.
- The Lover's Oak in Brunswick, Georgia, is estimated to be 900 years old.
- Lanier's Oak in Brunswick, Georgia, where poet Sidney Lanier was inspired to write "The Marshes of Glynn"
- Grandma's Oak is a southern live oak in Columbus, Texas estimated to be over 500 years-old that some believe is the second oldest live oak in the state of Texas. It is located on Walnut Street (Old US 90) about a mile west of downtown Columbus. It measures 338 inches in circumference and 61 feet in height with a crown spread of 114 feet.
- The Treaty Oak in Austin, Texas
- The Treaty Oak in Jacksonville, Florida
- The Bland Oak in Sydney, Australia, is one of the oldest trees in the city and the largest oak tree in the country, planted in the 1840s by inventor and politician William Bland.
- The Airlie Oak in Wilmington, NC dates to about 1545. It is the largest Live Oak in North Carolina, with a circumference of over 6.4 m (21 ft).
- The Big Oak in Thomasville, Georgia.
- The Baranoff Oak in Safety Harbor, Florida is reportedly the oldest live oak in Pinellas County, Florida and is estimated to be between 300 and 500 years old.
- McDonogh Oak in City Park, New Orleans, LA is around 800 years old and several beams have been erected to support the trees' limbs. The tree was named in honor of John McDonogh who donated City Park's original 100 acres in 1854.

== See also ==
- Canopy (biology)
- Live Oak Society
- Tree Avenue or tree alley (allée)
