= Live Oak Society =

American organization for conserving oak trees

- Formation: 1934
- Purpose: Conservation, preservation
- Headquarters: 1606 Water Street, Lecompte, Louisiana
- Region served: U.S. States with Southern live oaks
- Chairman: Coleen Perilloux Landry
- Website: Live Oak Society

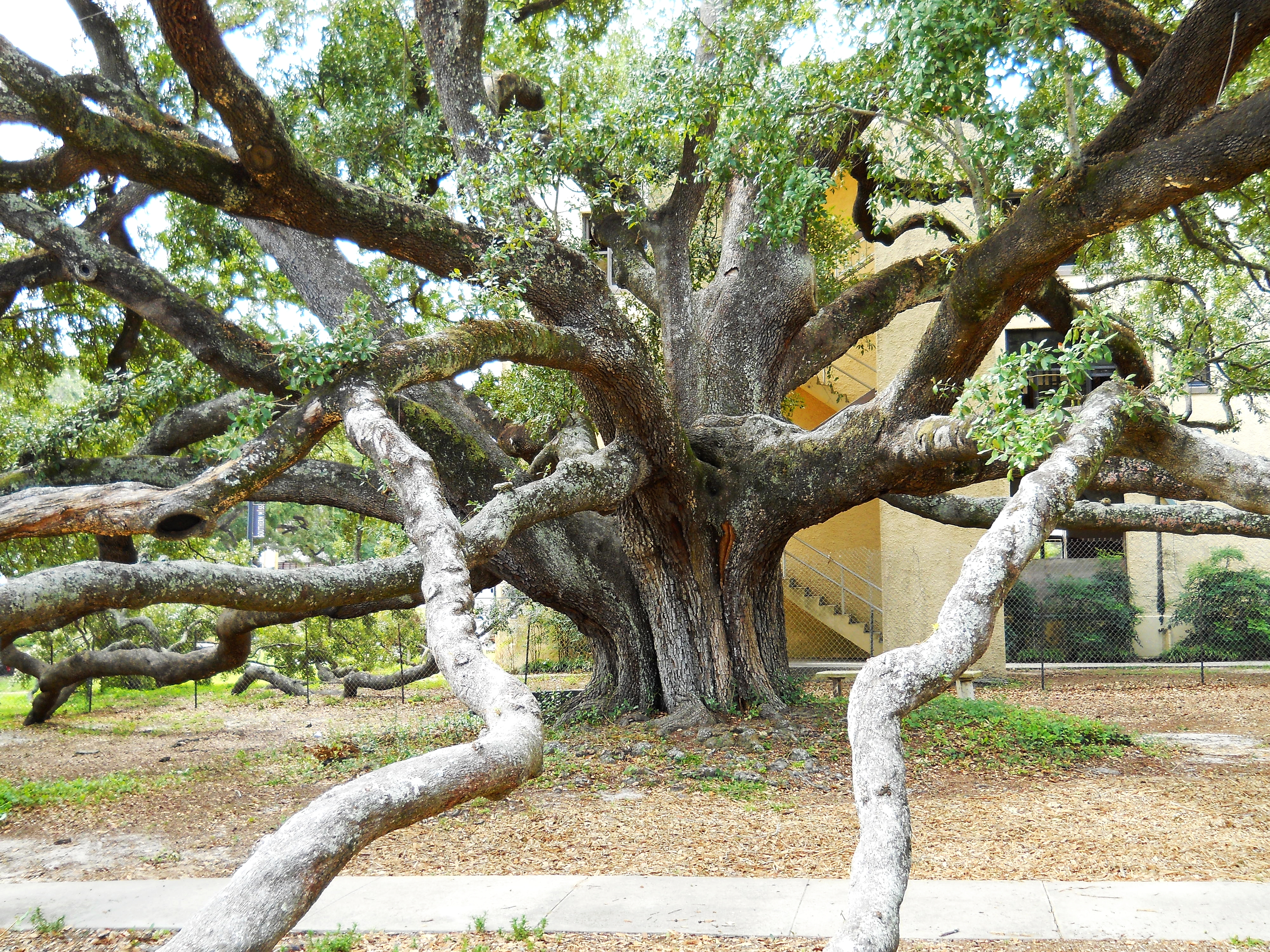
Friendship Oak is member number 110 at the Live Oak Society

The Live Oak Society is a membership organization for mature live oak trees. It was founded in 1934 to advance the culture, distribution, preservation, and appreciation of the southern live oak (Quercus virginiana) and functions under the auspices of the Louisiana Garden Club Federation, Inc. By 2013, more than 7,000 live oaks were registered with the Society.

== History ==
Dr. Edwin Lewis Stephens, president of Southwestern Louisiana Institute (now University of Louisiana at Lafayette) from 1900 to 1938, founded the Live Oak Society in 1934. In 1957, responsibility for maintaining records and registering new applicants was assumed by the Louisiana Garden Club Federation, Inc. According to Society bylaws, the only human member permitted in the Society is the honorary chairman, who is responsible for registering and recording live oak members. The only requirement for becoming a member is that the live oak must have a girth (trunk circumference) of 8 feet (2.4 meters) or greater, measured 4.5 feet (1.4 meters) above ground.

== Features ==
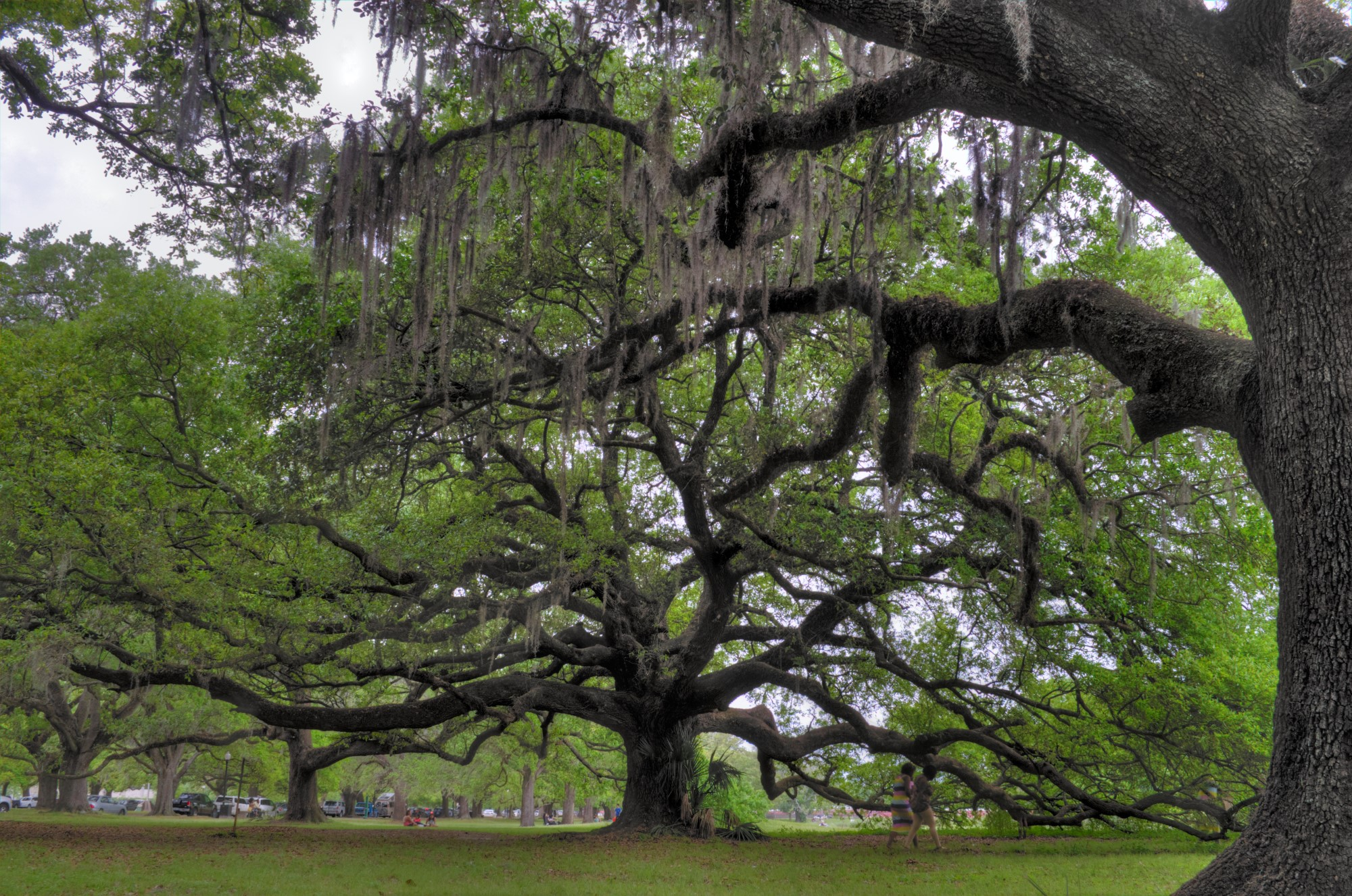
Live oaks in City Park (New Orleans)

In 2013, the Live Oak Society had 7,114 registered members dating from 1934, but many of the earliest registrants are labeled deceased. The live oak with the largest girth serves as President of the Society. In 1968, Seven Sisters Oak achieved President status and has retained the title with a girth of more than 38 feet (12 meters), as measured in 2008. The largest stand (group) of registered live oaks, consisting of more than 200 trees, is located in City Park (New Orleans).

Two classes of registration are available: Junior League Trees are those having a girth of 8 to 16 feet (2.4 to 4.9 meters), and Centenarian Trees that are more than 16 feet in girth. Trees are registered by designated name, location, girth, and sponsor. The registry includes trees from 14 U.S. states.

== See also ==
- National Register of Big Trees
