= The Athelstan Club =

Private gentlemen's club in Alabama, US

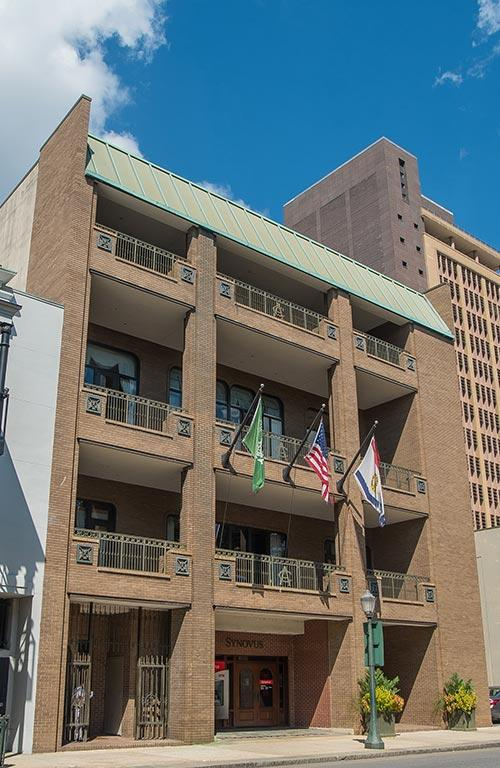
- The Athelstan Club of Mobile, Alabama
- Founded: 1873; 153 years ago
- Location: 170 St Francis St, Mobile, Alabama

The Athelstan Club, formerly The Athelstan Masonic Temple, is a private gentlemen's club in Mobile, Alabama, United States, founded in 1873, tracing its roots to a Masonic lodge established in 1870. By 1875 it had loosened membership to non-Masons and in 1876 formerly became The Athelstan Club. It admitted its first African-American member in 2011.

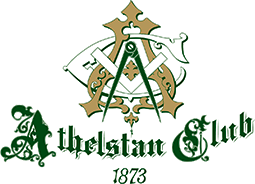
Athelstan Club Logo

The Athelstan Club is the eighth-oldest gentlemen's city club in the Southern United States, after The Oglethorpe Club (1870) and before The Louisiana Club (1877), offering the facilities of a traditional gentlemen's city club – regular hours, paid staff, a bar, a dining room, lodging rooms – that are associated with the English model of city clubs in the St. James's district of London. It is the oldest remaining gentlemen's club in Mobile after The Manassas Club closed prior to The Great Depression.

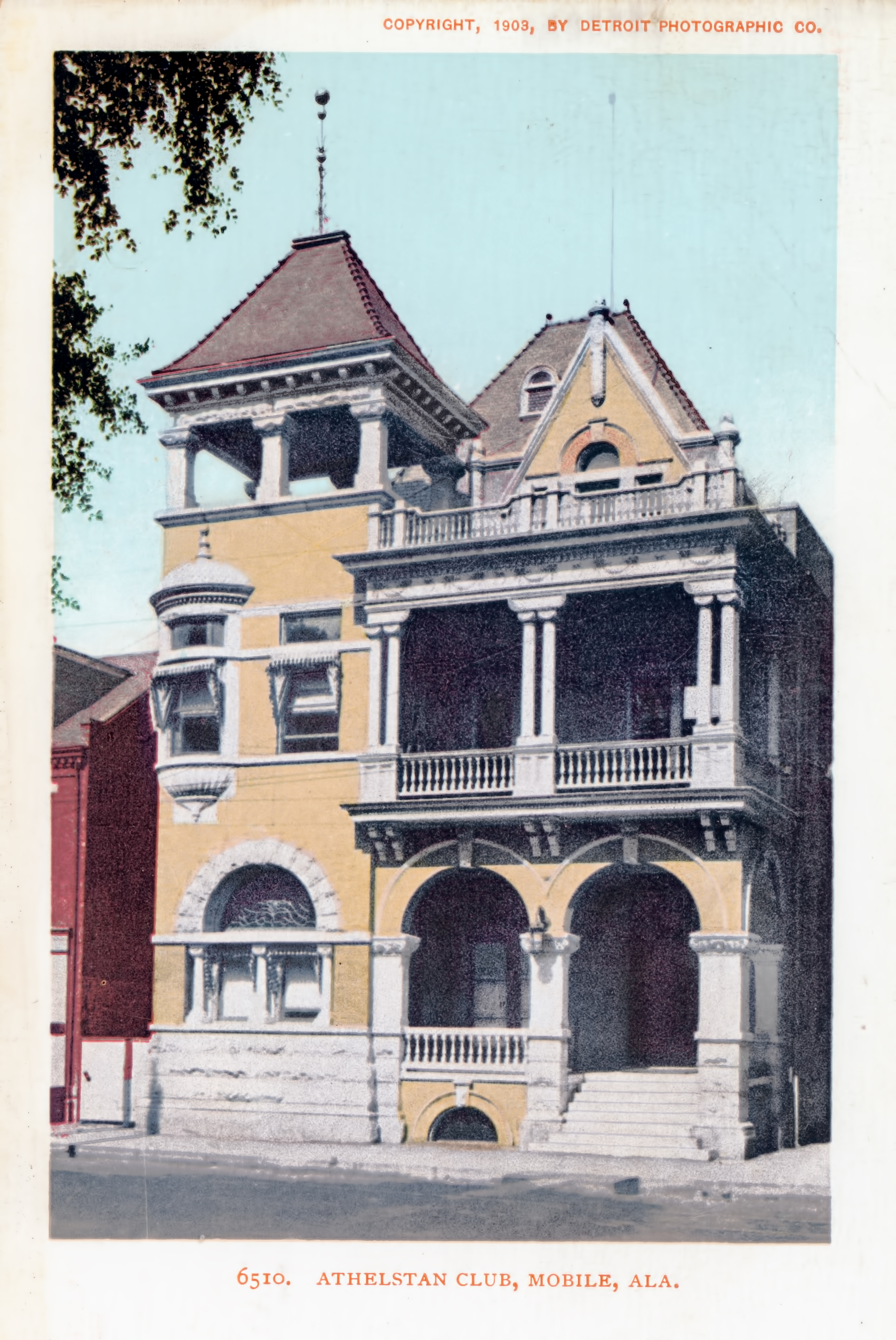
The Athelstan Club 1903, 158 St Francis Street

The club operates under laws for 501(c)(7) Social and Recreation Clubs; in 2024 it claimed total revenue of $1,454,719 and total assets of $1,119,486.

== History ==
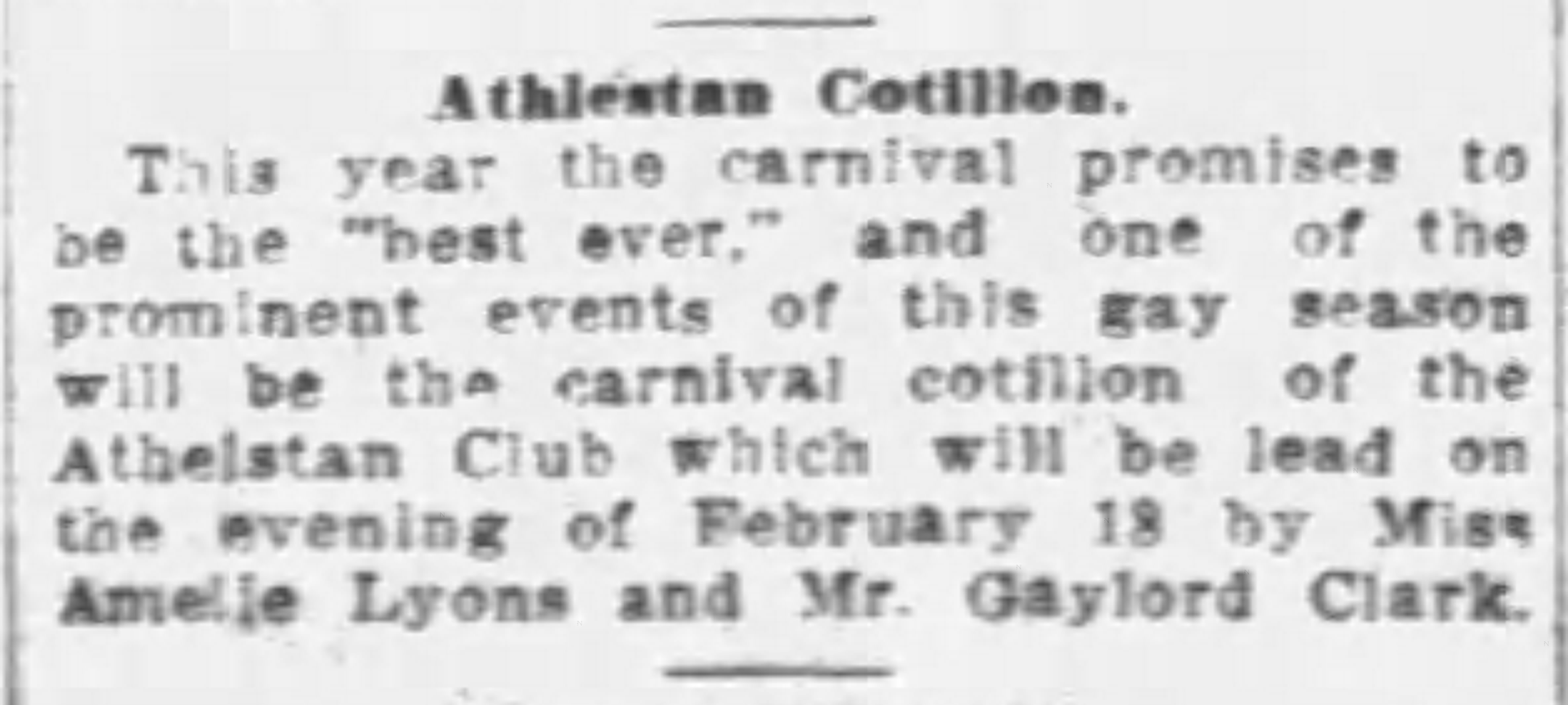
Athelstan Club Mobile Alabama The Montgomery Advertiser Sun Jan 31 1909

=== Domino Ball - Double Rush ===
The Athelstan Club's signature Carnival Event is the Domino Ball - Double Rush which opens the Carnival Season, after Advent and before Lent. The name is taken from The Domino, a Venetian robe-like Masquerade Ball costume dating to masquerades of the 18th century.

"They are made of silk, satin, and brocade or plain cotton, in the Princess shape often having a Watteau plait with capes, large hood called a "bahoo", and wide sleeves. They are designed to slip over someone's attire easily, and hide it completely."

The domino costume represented intrigue, adventure, conspiracy, and mystery, four elements that were a distinct part of the masquerade atmosphere. The Domino costume was also often worn by both sexes.

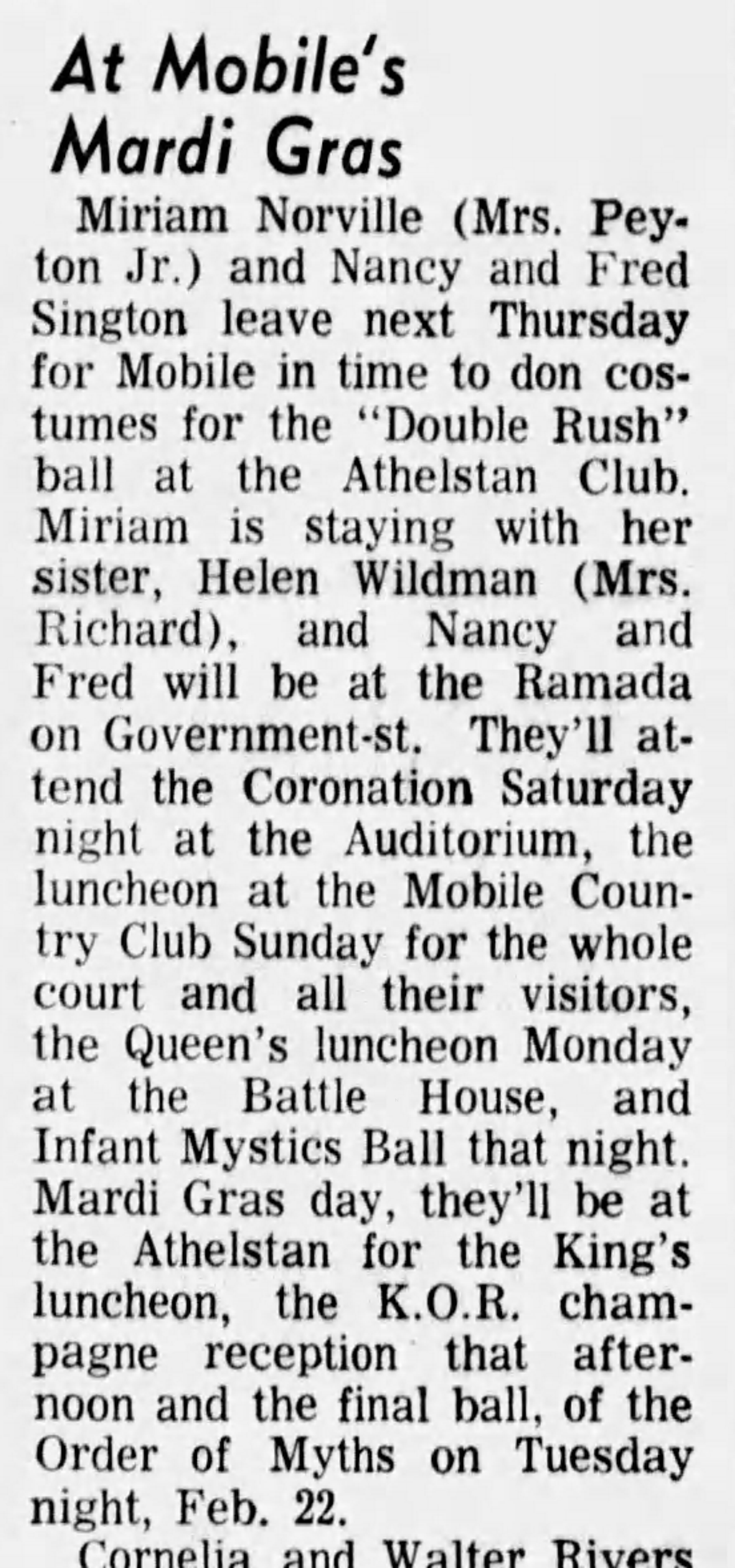
Athelstan Double Rush Birmingham Post Herald Fri Feb 11 1966

==== Leading Ladies ====
The Club invites members' daughters to make their debut and elects a Leading Lady, who have been

- 2020: Cara Louise Luther
- 2021: Ruth Dickson Thames
- 2022: Adelaide Elizabeth Bell
- 2023: Lillian-Louise Rathle
- 2024: Jayne Isabelle Ladas

=== Notable members ===
- Ernest F. Ladd Civic leader
- E.B. Peebles II Civic leader
- George Bigelow Rogers Architect
- John B. Waterman Maritime Industrialist

== Significance ==
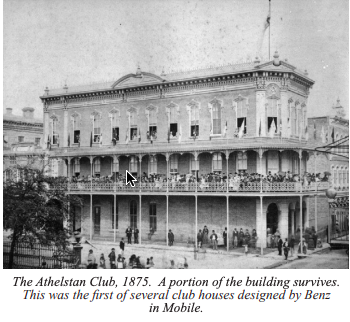
Athelstan Club 1875 Mobile Alabama

The Athelstan Club is a social club with few details known about its constituents. Members usually announce their associations upon death, in their obituaries. Its clubhouse has held lavish balls, regular daily lunches, monthly dinners, and business & social functions. Its events and social activities were the fodder for many newspaper and social columns from the end of the 19th century into the 20th and 21st centuries.

== Homes of the Athelstan Club ==
- 12 Royal Street: 1873–1875
- 100 Dauphin Street: 1875–1901
- 158 St Francis Street: 1902–1969
- 170 St Francis Street: 1969–present

== Gallery ==
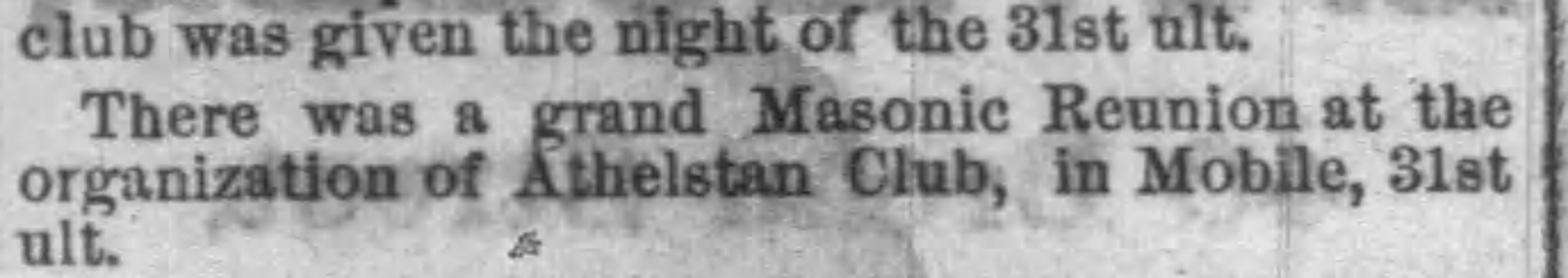
Athelstan Club Mobile Alabama The Times Argus Fri Feb 14 1873

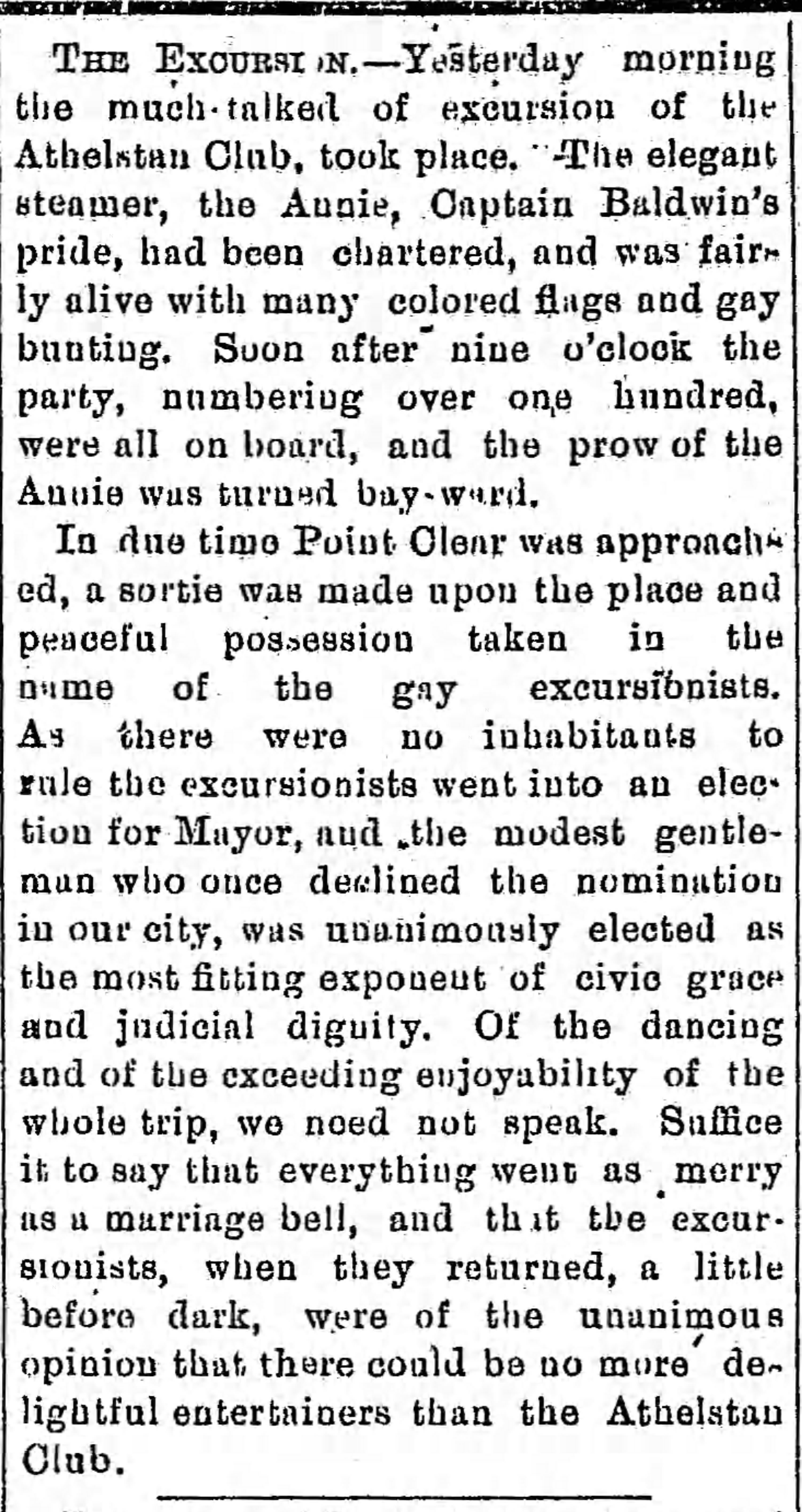
Athelstan Club Mobile Alabama The Mobile Daily Tribune Thu May 20, 1875

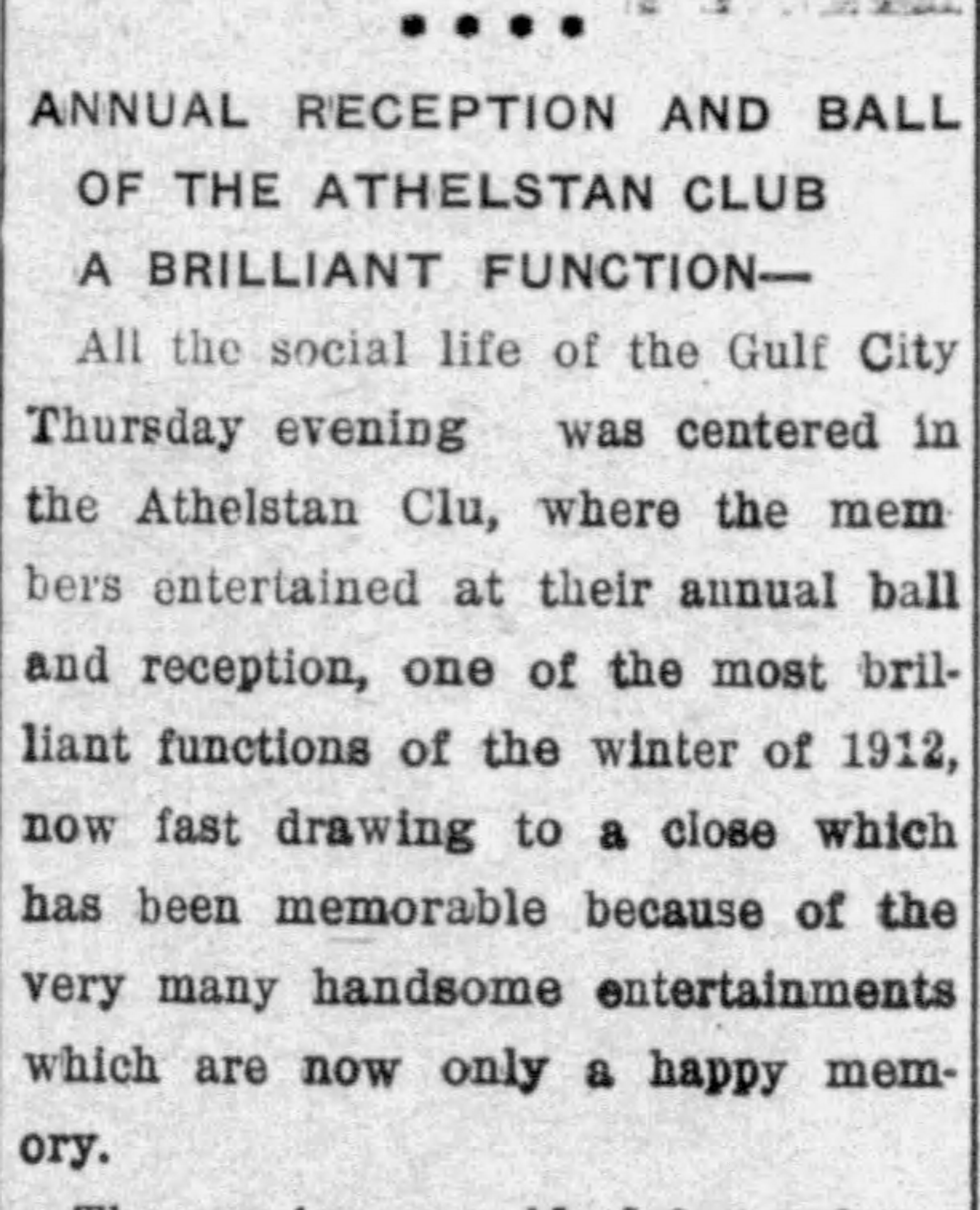
Athelstan Club Mobile Alabama The Tuscaloosa News Thu Dec 19 1912

== See also ==
- Striker's Independent Society
- Order of Myths
- The Manassas Club
- Cowbellion de Rakin Society
