= Infant Mystics =

Mobile Alabama Mardi Gras Organization

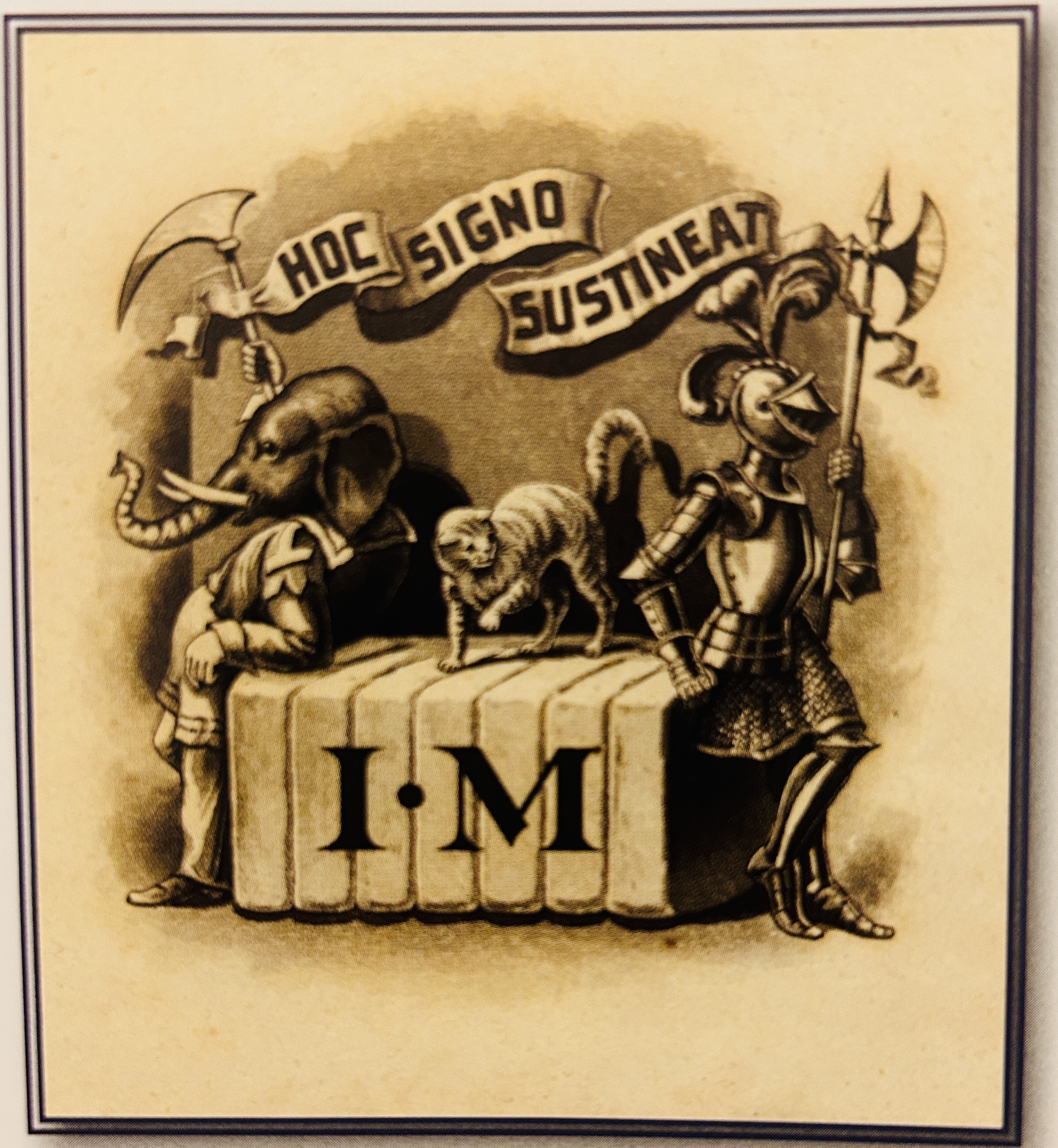
Logo of the Infant Mystics

The Infant Mystics, (IMs) founded in 1868, is the third oldest mystic society to celebrate Mardi Gras in Mobile, Alabama, after the Striker's Independent Society and Order Of Myths. It is the second oldest continuously parading mystic society in the United States after the Order of Myths. The Infant Mystics were a continuation of an earlier society named Hoc Signo Sustineat. The Infant Mystics emblem is a Knight representing chivalry, an Elephant representing remembrance and a black cat representing mystery and secretiveness. The most prominent of the three, the black cat, is perched on top of a cotton bale. The elephant and knight hold a banner that reads “Hoc Signo Sustineat” in homage to the origins of the Infant Mystics. For most of their history they have paraded on the night of Lundi Gras, the day before Mardi Gras (Fat Tuesday).

The Infant Mystics were so named because when they were formed, they represented a new younger generation of Mardi Gras revelers.

== Cotton Hall ==
The Infant Mystics Den is located in downtown Mobile at the corner of Dauphin Street and Broad Street and is the former Protestant Orphans' Asylum built in 1838 and renamed to Cotton Hall when the IMs took it over. It is a large sprawling campus that contains five different buildings including a float barn. The Infant Mystics annual parade leaves from Cotton Hall and the annual ball is held there as well.
