= Mardi Gras =

Holiday on the day before Ash Wednesday

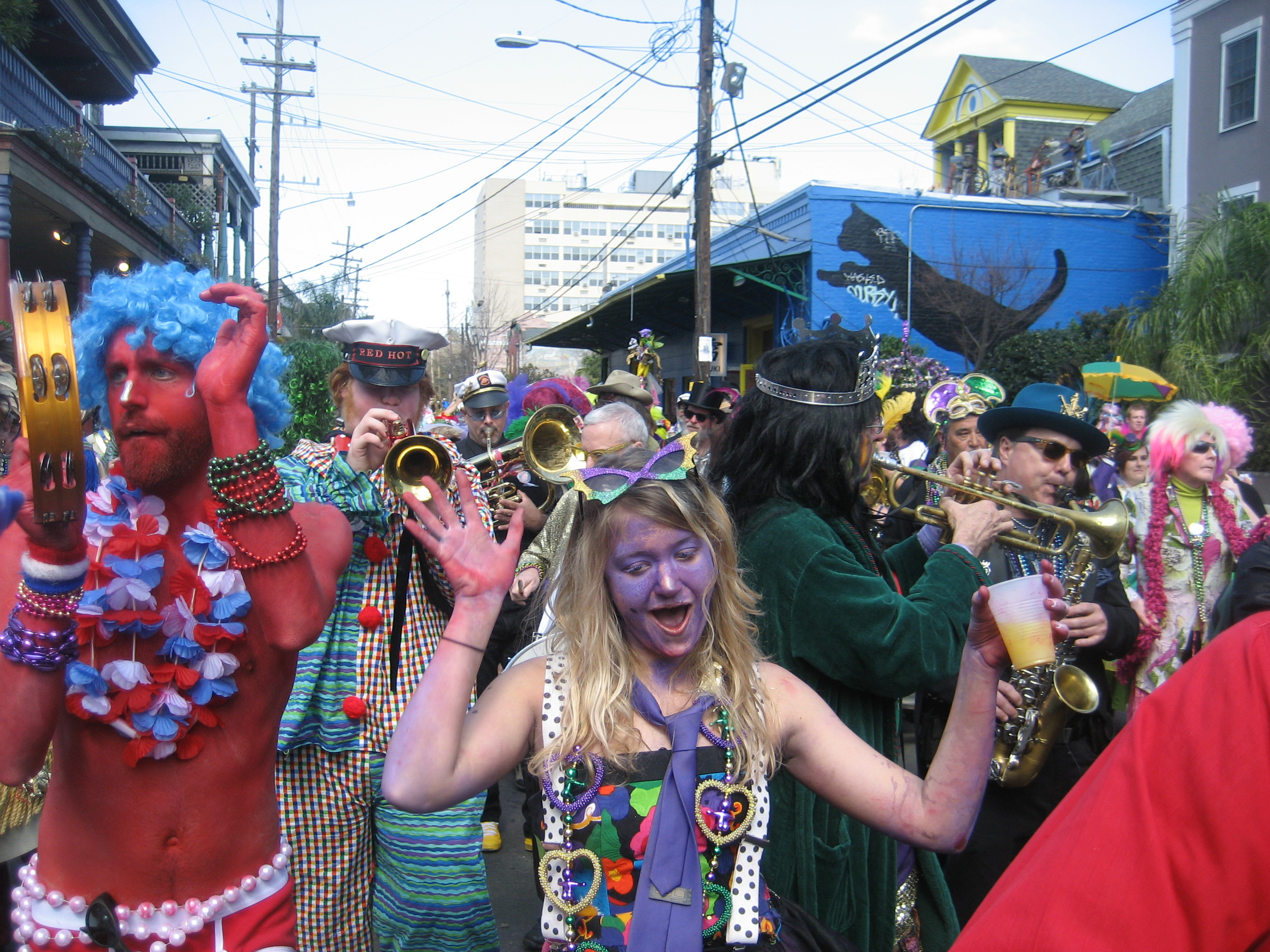
- Celebrations in New Orleans, Louisiana, U.S.
- Also called: Fat Tuesday, Shrove Tuesday, Pancake Tuesday
- Type: Christian, cultural
- Significance: Celebration period before fasting season of Lent
- Celebrations: Parades, parties
- Date: Day before Ash Wednesday, 47 days before Easter, 2 days after Shrove Sunday
- 2025 date: March 4
- 2026 date: February 17
- 2027 date: February 9
- 2028 date: February 29
- Frequency: Annual
- Related to: Shrove Tuesday, Carnival, Shrove Monday, Pre-Lent, Ash Wednesday, Lent, Užgavėnės, Maslenitsa

Mardi Gras (UK: /ˌmɑːrdi ˈɡrɑː/; US: /ˈmɑːrdi ɡrɑː/), also known as Shrove Tuesday, is the final day of Carnival (also known as Shrovetide or Fastelavn); it thus falls on the day before the beginning of Lent on Ash Wednesday. Mardi Gras ([maʁdi ɡʁa]) is French for "Fat Tuesday", referring to it being the last day of consuming rich, fatty foods, most notably red meat, in preparation for the Christian fasting season of Lent, during which such foods are avoided.

Related popular practices are associated with Carnival celebrations before the fasting and religious obligations associated with the penitential season of Lent. In countries such as the United Kingdom, Mardi Gras is more usually known as Pancake Day or (traditionally) Shrove Tuesday, derived from the word shrive, meaning "to administer the sacrament of confession to; to absolve".

== Background ==
During the liturgical season of Lent, some Christians abstain from the consumption of certain foods such as meat, eggs, dairy products, and alcoholic beverages. Most Christian denominations observe the tradition of Lent; exceptions include many churches within the Anabaptist, Baptist, Methodist, and Reformed traditions. Shrovetide provided Christians with the opportunity to use up these foods prior to the start of the 40-day fasting season of Lent.

Prior to the 6th century, Lent was normatively observed through the practice of the Black Fast, which enjoins fasting from food and liquids, with the allowance of one vegetarian meal and water after sunset. The tradition of pancake breakfasts during Shrovetide, as well as that of pancake races, owes itself to this practice of "using up the surplus eggs, milk and butter" prior to Lent.

The specific tradition of eating pancakes is said to have roots in Slavic paganism, with this practice being co-opted into Christian ritual. Specifically the pancake was said to symbolise the returning of the sun as spring approached.

In many Christian parish churches, both Protestant and Roman Catholic, a popular Shrove Tuesday tradition is the ringing of the church bells (on this day, the toll is known as the Shriving Bell) "to call the faithful to confession before the solemn season of Lent" and for people to "begin frying their pancakes". As such, a hallmark of Shrovetide is the opportunity for a last round of merrymaking associated with Mardis Gras before the start of the somber Lenten season. The last day of Shrovetide, Mardi Gras (Fat Tuesday), is named as such "because people felt bloated having eaten up all the rich foods before Lent" in order to prepare for the coming season of repentance.

== Traditions ==
The festival season varies from city to city; Mardis Gras often refers to the last day of Shrovetide (or Fastelavn or Carnival), thus being synonymous with Shrove Tuesday. Some traditions, such as the one in New Orleans, Louisiana, consider Mardi Gras to stretch the entire period from Twelfth Night (the last night of Christmas which begins Epiphany) to Ash Wednesday. Others treat the final three-day period before Ash Wednesday as the Mardi Gras.

In Mobile, Alabama, Mardi Gras–associated social events begin in November, followed by mystic society balls New Year's Eve, followed by parades and balls in January and February, celebrating up to midnight before Ash Wednesday. In earlier times, parades were held on New Year's Day. Carnival (or Fastelavn or Shrovetide) is an important celebration in Lutheran, Anglican and Catholic European nations.

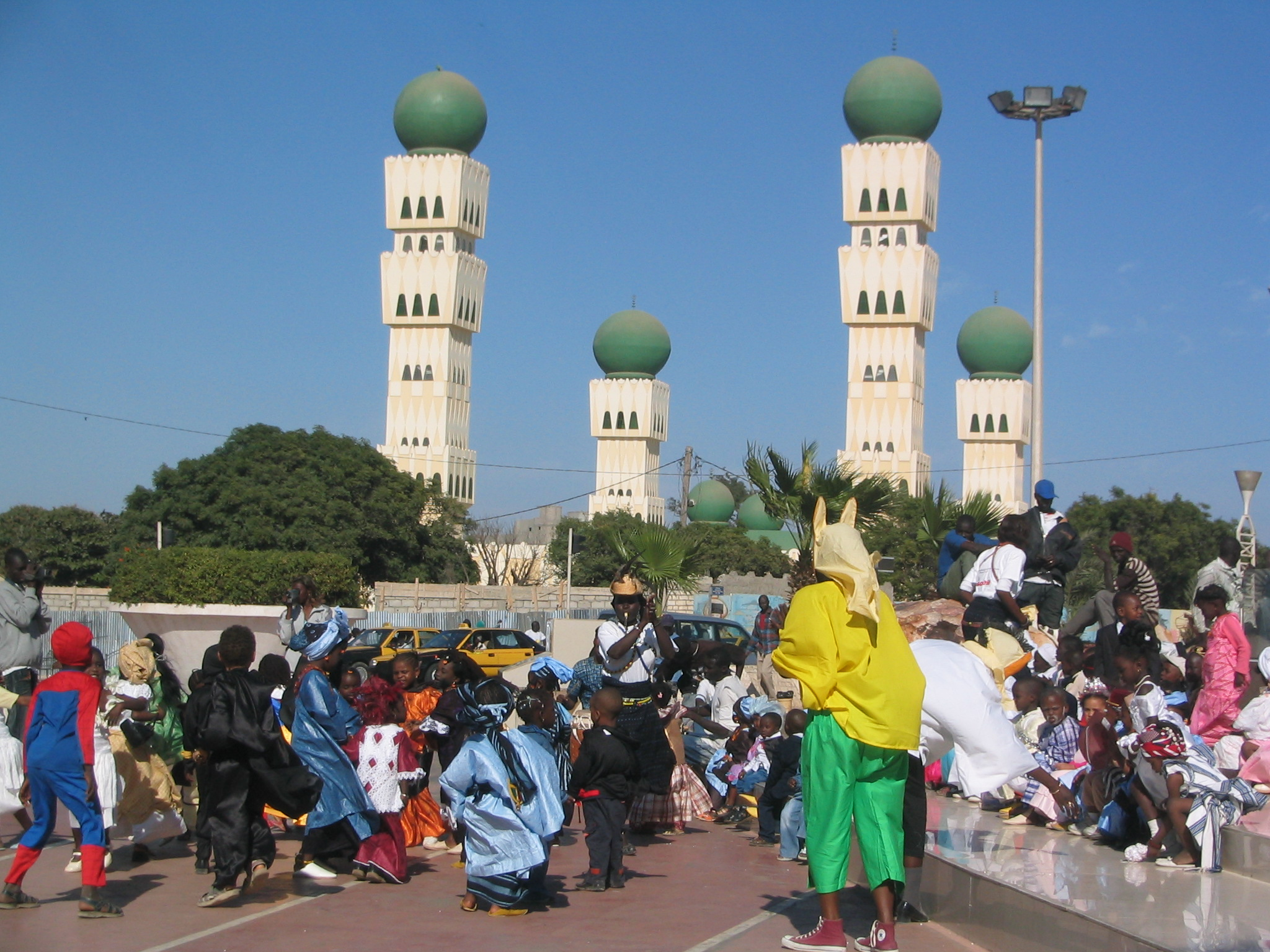
Mardi Gras in Dakar, Senegal

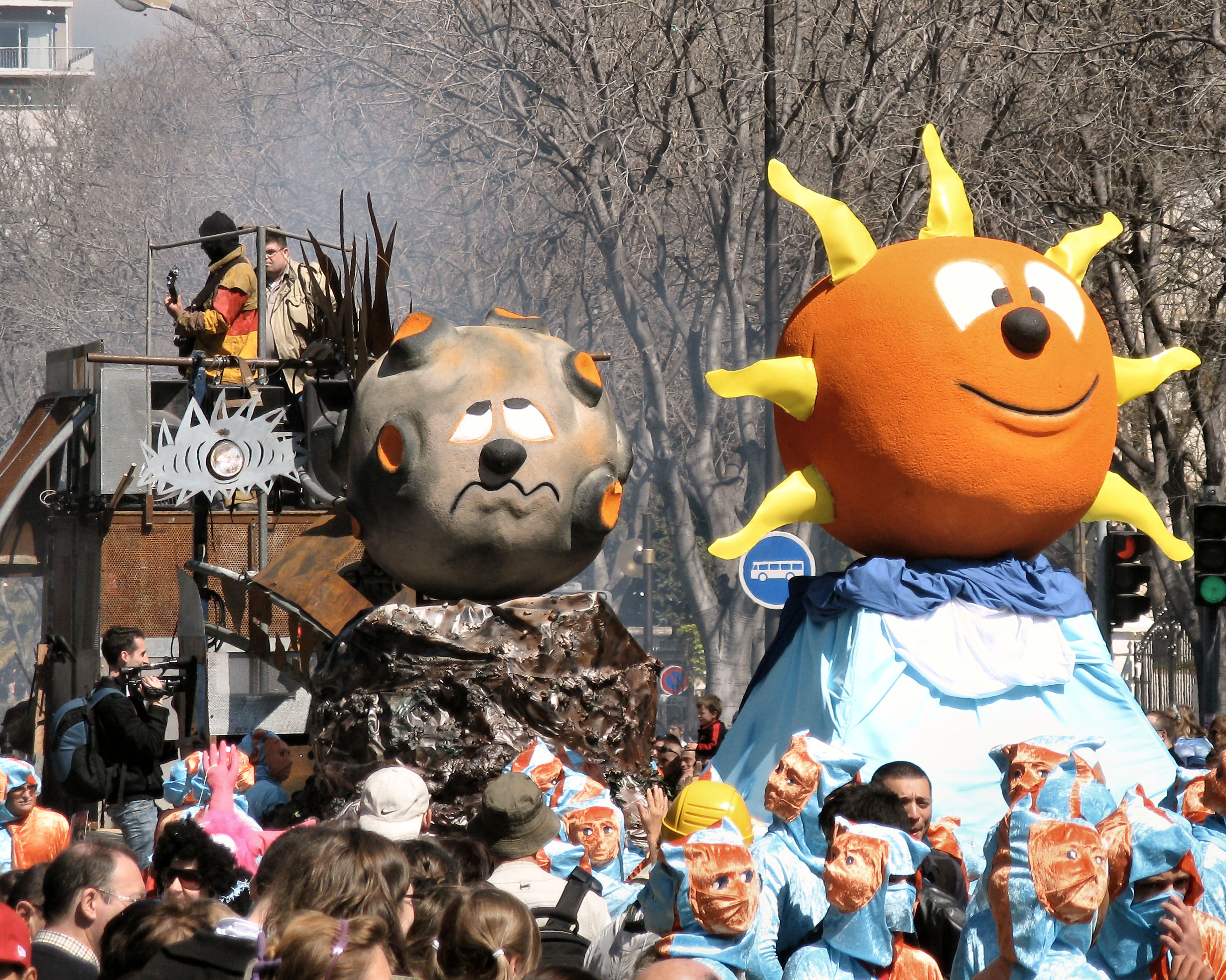
Mardi Gras in Marseille, France

=== Belgium ===
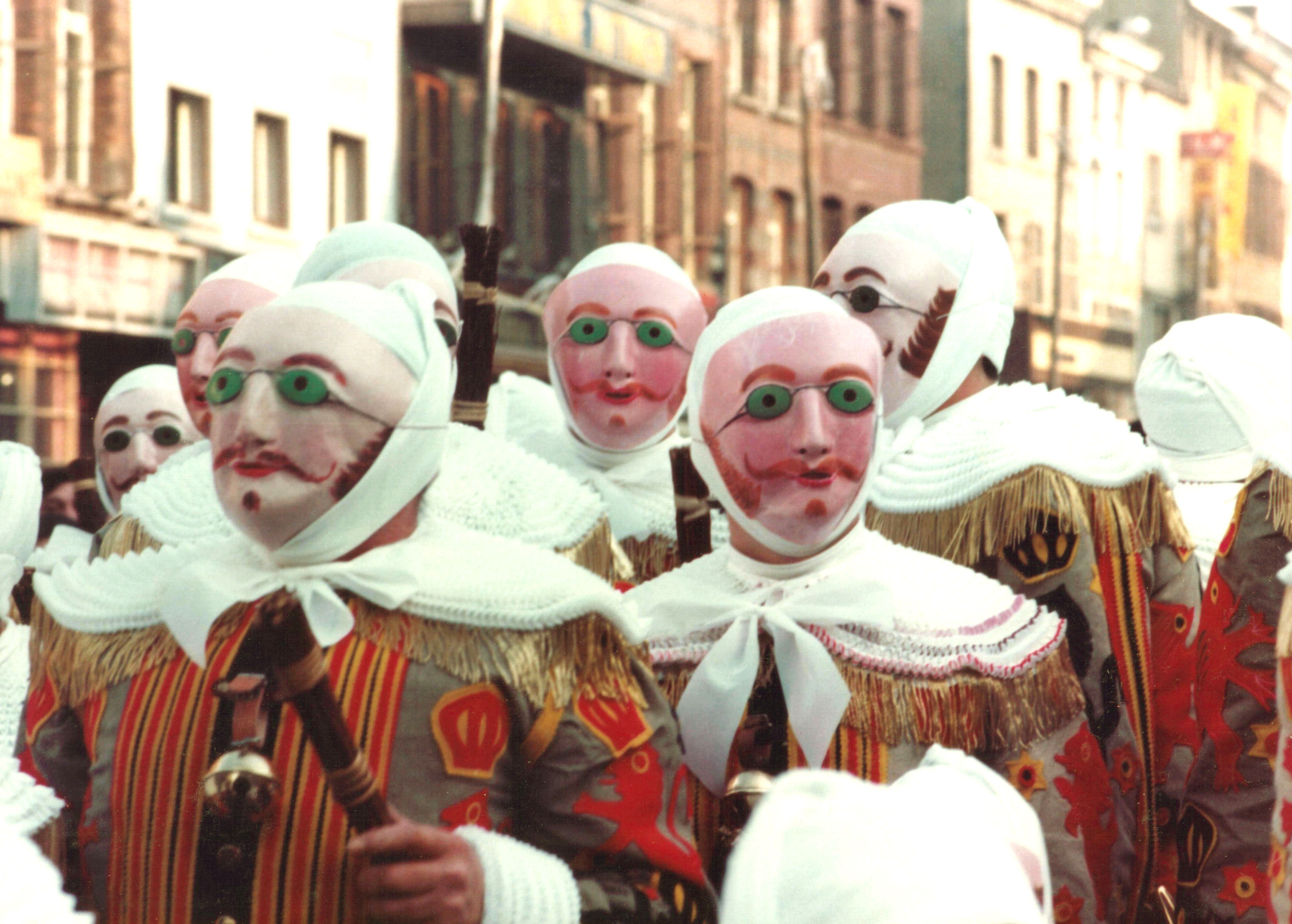
Mardi Gras in Binche, Belgium

The three-day Carnival of Binche, near Mons, is one of the best known in Belgium. It takes place around Shrove Tuesday (or Mardi Gras) just before Lent. Performers known as Gilles wear elaborate costumes in the national colours of red, black and yellow. During the parade, they throw oranges at the crowd. In 2003, it was recognized by UNESCO as one of the Masterpieces of the Oral and Intangible Heritage of Humanity.

=== Czech Republic ===
In the Czech Republic, it is a folk tradition to celebrate Mardi Gras, which is called Masopust (meat-fast, i.e. beginning of the fast there). There are celebrations in many places including Prague, but the tradition also prevails in villages such as Staré Hamry, whose door-to-door processions made it to the UNESCO World Intangible Cultural Heritage List.

=== Germany ===
The celebration on the same day in Germany knows many different terms, depending on the region, such as Fastnacht, meaning the eve of the fast that takes place during Lent, or Veilchensdienstag (Violet Tuesday), as it is called in the Lower Rhine region. The celebrations often stretch from Epiphany, known in sections of Germany as Heilige Drei Könige, through the night before Ash Wednesday, and is variously known by different names, such as Karneval or Fasching in Germany, Austria and German-speaking areas of Switzerland. It is also often referred to as the "fifth season", which traditionally begins with Hoppeditz Erwachen (the waking of Hoppeditz, the Fool who embodies the Karneval season) on 11 November at 11:11 AM (11/11 11:11). and ends with his comic funeral mass on Fastnacht.

Karneval is filled with large banquets held by the various organizing societies and generally comes to a climax beginning on what is variously known as Schmutziger Donnerstag or Fetter Donnerstag (Fat Thursday), Unsinniger Donnerstag (Nonsense Thursday), Altweiberfastnacht, Greesentag and others. In standard German, schmutzig means "dirty", but in the Alemannic dialects schmotzig means "lard" (Schmalz), or "fat"; thus "Greasy Thursday", as remaining winter stores of lard and butter used to be consumed at that time, before the fasting began. Altweiberfastnacht often featured women wearing men's clothing and assuming their roles. In many towns across the state of North Rhine Westphalia, a ritual "takeover" of the town halls by local women has become tradition.

=== Italy ===
In Italy Mardi Gras is called Martedì Grasso (Fat Tuesday). It is the main day of Carnival along with the Thursday before, called Giovedí Grasso (Fat Thursday), which ratifies the start of the celebrations. The most famous Carnivals in northern Italy are in Venice, Viareggio and Ivrea, while in the southern part of Italy the Sardinian Sartiglia and the intriguing apotropaic masks, especially the mamuthones, issohadores, s'urtzu (and so on), are more popular, belonging to a very ancient tradition. Ivrea has the characteristic "Battle of Oranges" that finds its roots in medieval times. The Italian version of the festival is spelled Carnevale.

=== Sweden ===
In Sweden the celebration is called Fettisdagen, when fastlagsbulle is eaten, more commonly called Semla. The name comes from the words "fett" (fat) and "tisdag" (Tuesday). Originally, this was the only day one should eat fastlagsbullar.

=== United Kingdom ===
See Shrove Tuesday.

=== United States ===
While not observed nationally throughout the United States, a number of historically ethnically French cities and regions in the country have notable celebrations. Mardi Gras arrived in North America as a French Catholic tradition with the Le Moyne brothers, Pierre Le Moyne d'Iberville and Jean-Baptiste Le Moyne de Bienville, in the late 17th century, when King Louis XIV sent the pair to defend France's claim on the territory of Louisiane, which included what are now the U.S. states of Alabama, Mississippi, Louisiana and part of eastern Texas.

The expedition, led by Iberville, entered the mouth of the Mississippi River on the evening of 2 March 1699 (new style), Lundi Gras. They did not yet know it was the river explored and claimed for France by René-Robert Cavelier, Sieur de La Salle in 1683. The party proceeded upstream to a place on the east bank about 60 miles (100 km) downriver from where New Orleans is today, and made camp. This was on 3 March 1699, Mardi Gras, so in honour of this holiday, Iberville named the spot Point du Mardi Gras (French: "Mardi Gras Point") and called the nearby tributary Bayou Mardi Gras.

Bienville went on to found the settlement of Mobile (now in Alabama) in 1702 as the first capital of French Louisiana. In 1703 French settlers in Mobile established the first organised Mardi Gras celebration tradition in what was to become the United States. The first informal mystic society, or krewe, was formed in Mobile in 1711, the Boeuf Gras Society. Then came the Striker's Independent Society in 1842, followed by the oldest parading mystic society the Order of Myths or "OOMs" in 1867.

In 1720, Biloxi had been made capital of Louisiana. The French Mardi Gras customs had accompanied the colonists who settled there.

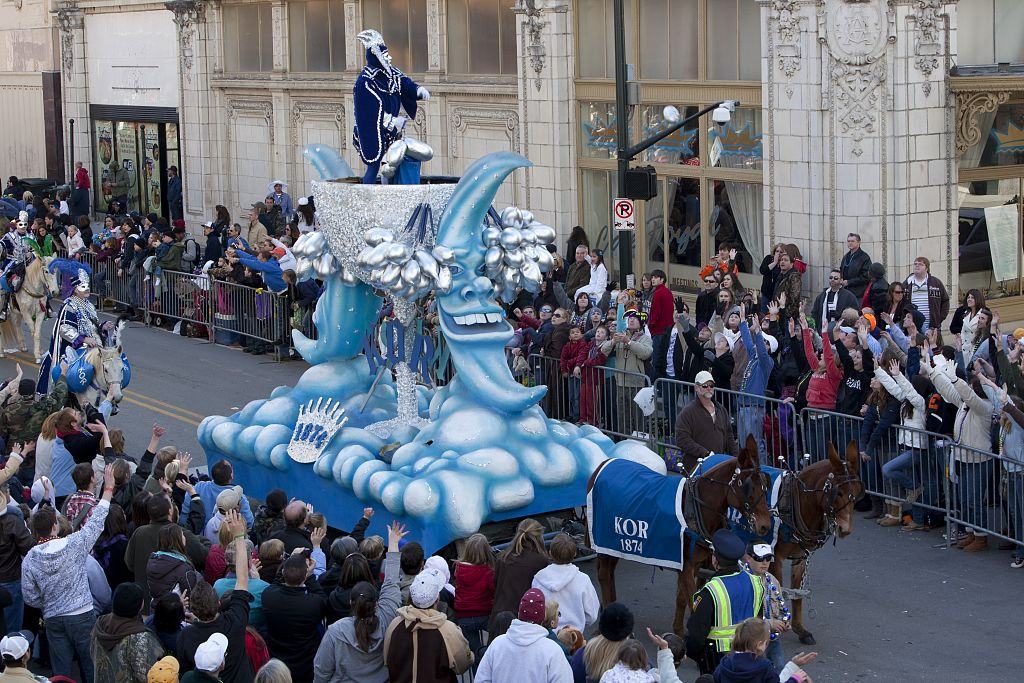
Knights of Revelry parade down Royal Street in Mobile during the 2010 Mardi Gras season.

In 1723, the capital of Louisiana was moved to New Orleans, founded in 1718. The first Mardi Gras parade held in New Orleans is recorded to have taken place in 1833 with Bernard de Marigny funding the first organized parade, tableau, and ball. The tradition in New Orleans expanded to the point that it became synonymous with the city in popular perception, and embraced by residents of New Orleans beyond those of French or Catholic heritage. Mardi Gras celebrations are part of the basis of the slogan Laissez les bons temps rouler ("Let the good times roll"), as floats "roll".

Festivities formally began in 1853 when a group of Protestant Anglo-Americans, some members of Mobile Mystic Societies, formed the first "old-line" krewe, The Mistick Krewe of Comus, based on Bernard de Marigny's 1833 parade of paper-mached wagons, a formal tableau vivant and presentation of debutants, followed by a formal ball. The Twelfth Night Revelers were formed in 1870, again with ties to Mobile, but no longer stage a parade, just tableau and ball. The Knights of Momus and Rex came about in 1872, with the last of the old-line krewes the Krewe of Proteus being formed 10 years later. Of these 5 groups only Rex and Proteus still formally parade, with the Knights of Chaos replacing Momus.

The parades of the largest krewes (colloquially known as "super krewes") came later, during the 1960s/70's, and traditionally occur immediately prior to and on Shrove Tuesday, including those of Endymion (Saturday, which also culminates with a concert event at Caesars Superdome), Bacchus (Sunday), and Zulu and Rex (Tuesday).

Other cities along the Gulf Coast with early French colonial heritage, from Pensacola, Florida, and Galveston, Texas, to Lake Charles and Lafayette, Louisiana, and north to Natchez, Mississippi, and Alexandria, Louisiana, have active Mardi Gras celebrations.

Galveston's first recorded Mardi Gras celebration, in 1867, included a masked ball at Turner Hall (Sealy at 21st St.) and a theatrical performance from Shakespeare's "King Henry IV" featuring Alvan Reed (a justice of the peace weighing in at 350 pounds) as Falstaff. The first year that Mardi Gras was celebrated on a grand scale in Galveston was 1871 with the emergence of two rival Mardi Gras societies, or "Krewes" called the Knights of Momus (known only by the initials "K.O.M.") and the Knights of Myth, both of which devised night parades, masked balls, exquisite costumes and elaborate invitations. The Knights of Momus, led by some prominent Galvestonians, decorated horse-drawn wagons for a torch lit night parade. Boasting such themes as "The Crusades", "Peter the Great", and "Ancient France", the procession through downtown Galveston culminated at Turner Hall with a presentation of tableaux and a grand gala.

In the rural Acadiana area, many Cajuns celebrate with the Courir de Mardi Gras, a tradition that dates to medieval celebrations in France.

St. Louis, Missouri, founded in 1764 by French fur traders, claims to host the second largest Mardi Gras celebration in the United States. The celebration is held in the historic French neighborhood, Soulard, and attracts hundreds of thousands of people from around the country. Although founded in the 1760s, the St. Louis Mardi Gras festivities only date to the 1980s. The city's celebration begins with "12th night", held on Epiphany, and ends on Fat Tuesday. The season is peppered with various parades celebrating the city's rich French Catholic heritage.

== Costumes ==
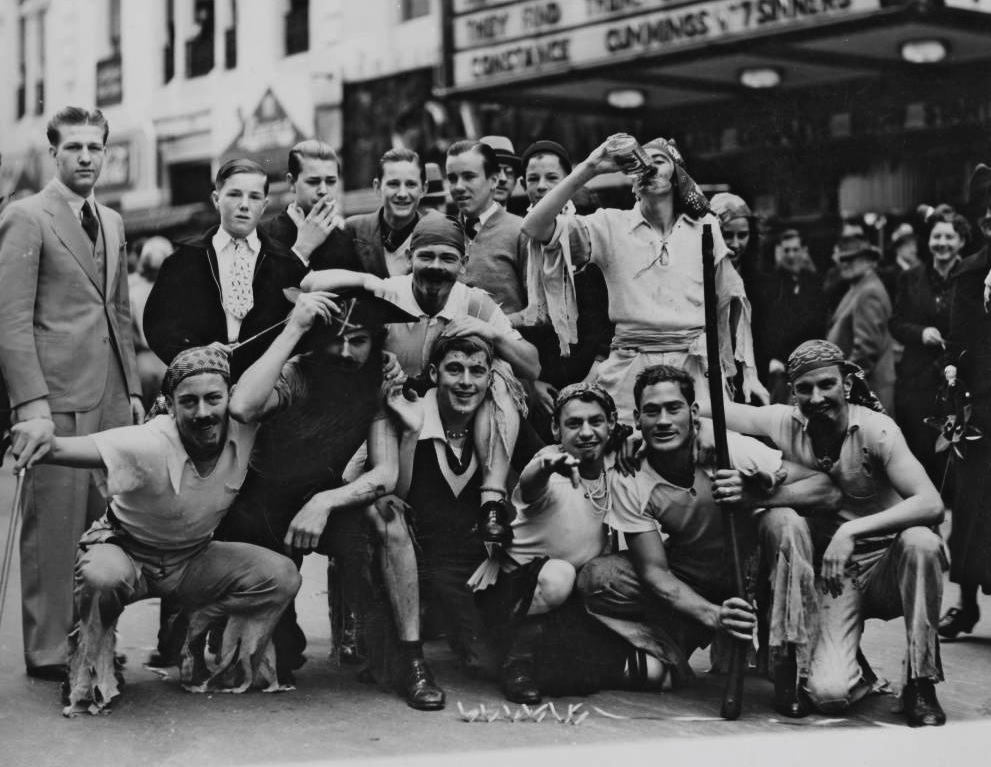
Mardi Gras in New Orleans in 1937

Mardi Gras, as a celebration of life before the more-somber occasion of Ash Wednesday, nearly always involves the use of masks and costumes by its participants, and the most popular celebratory colors are purple, green, and gold. In New Orleans, for example, these often take the shape of fairies, animals, people from myths, or various Medieval costumes as well as clowns and Native Americans.

=== Exposure by women ===
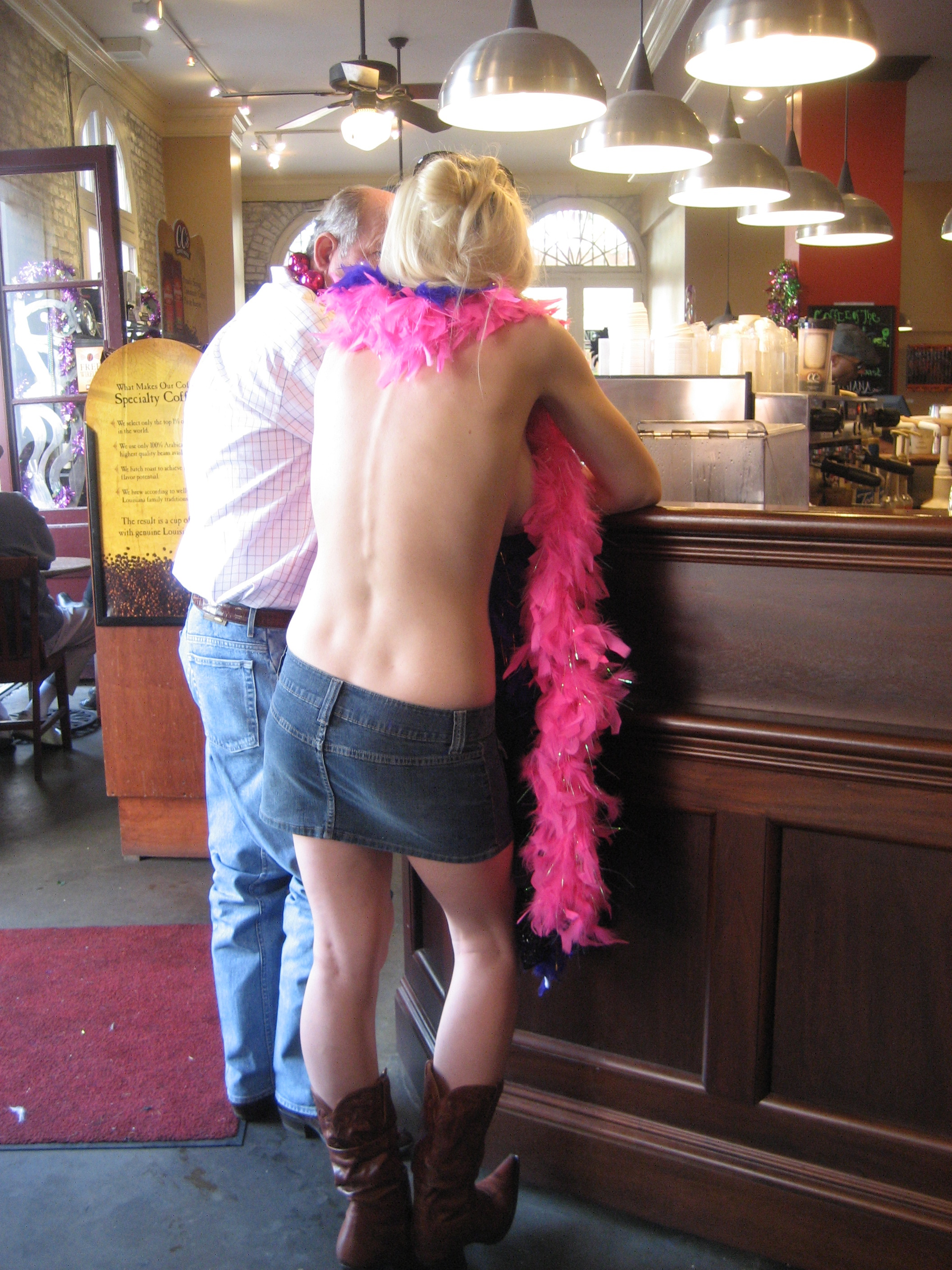
A topless woman at a coffee house, Mardi Gras Day in New Orleans, 2009

Although the Church teaches that it is sinful and that it contravenes the Christian standards of modesty, the practice of some women exposing their breasts during Mardi Gras in New Orleans, US, has been documented since 1889, when the Times-Democrat decried the "degree of immodesty exhibited by nearly all female masqueraders seen on the streets." The practice was mostly limited to tourists in the upper Bourbon Street area. In the crowded streets of the French Quarter, generally avoided by locals on Mardi Gras Day, flashers on balconies cause crowds to form on the streets.

In the last decades of the 20th century, the rise in producing commercial videotapes catering to voyeurs helped encourage a tradition of women baring their breasts in exchange for beads and trinkets. Social scientists studying "ritual disrobement" found, at Mardi Gras 1991, 1,200 instances of body-baring in exchange for beads or other favors.

== See also ==
- Bead Town – American traveling art exhibit
- Carnaval de Ponce – Annual celebration held in Ponce, Puerto Rico
- Bœuf Gras – French traditional holiday figure
- Fantasy Fest – Street party in Key West, Florida
- Fat Thursday – Christian tradition before Lent
- Maslenitsa – Slavic folk and Christian holiday
- Shrove Tuesday – Tuesday before Ash Wednesday
- Sydney Gay and Lesbian Mardi Gras – Annual LGBTQIA+ pride event in Australia
- Tsiknopempti – Greek traditional feast
- Užgavėnės – Lithuanian festival
