= The Manassas Club =

Gentlemen's Club in Mobile, AL, USA

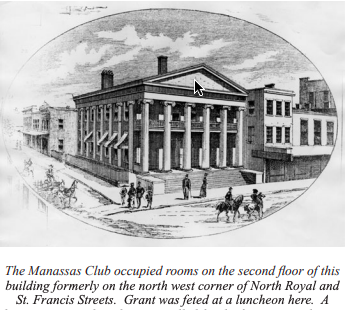
- Founded: 1861; 164 years ago
- Location: Mobile, Alabama, Alabama

The Manassas Club was a gentlemen's club in Mobile, Alabama, founded in 1861.

== History ==
Founded in November 1861, the Manassas Club was the oldest gentlemen's club in Mobile, Alabama, preceding The Athelstan Club by a decade.

In an article by the Mobile Press Register Today in history: Wrapping up Mardi Gras 1911,

"Hundreds of maskers entered the prize contest arranged by the Carnival Association, gathering on the east side of Bienville Square Tuesday afternoon at 3 o'clock, from where they were viewed by the judges from the balcony of the Manassas Club. . . A sensation was caused by the appearance of a magnificently costumed debutante among the throng, and Chief Price, of the fire department, nearly got in bad with all his friends by escorting the lady down Dauphin street. Dares were handed about on the gallery of the Manassas Club, but no member had the hardihood to be seen in company with the dashing belle. It later transpired that the 'peach' was Tommy Price, who won the first prize for individual maskers."

== Famous guests ==
Ulysses S. Grant was hosted for a luncheon in April 1880.

== Gallery ==
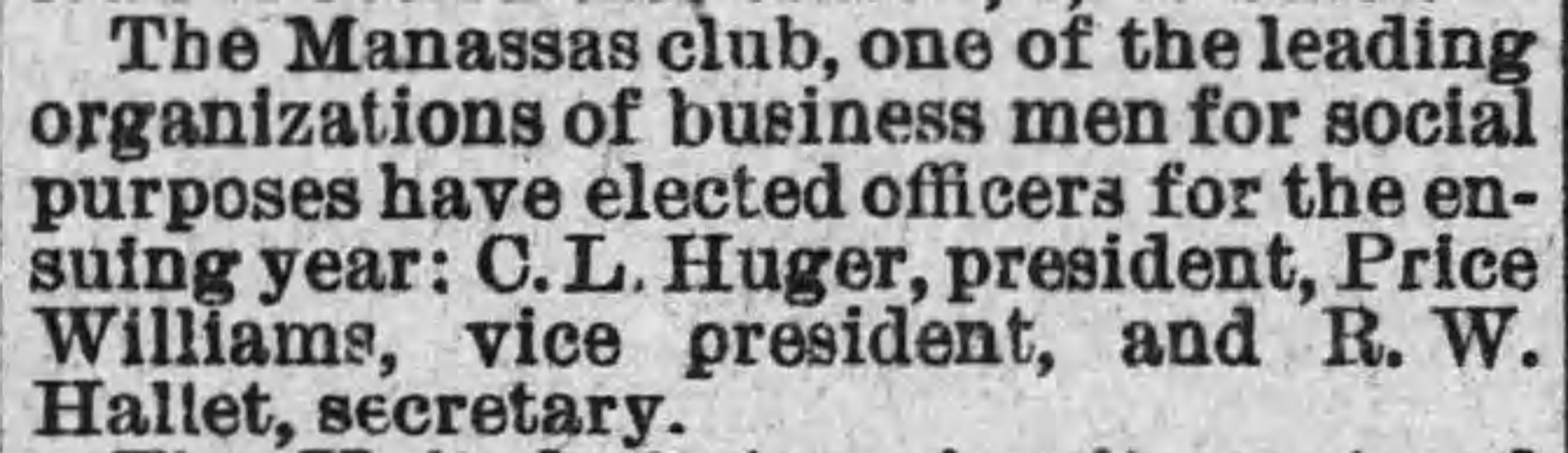
The Manassas Club Mobile Alabama The Weekly Advertiser Tue Dec 22 1885

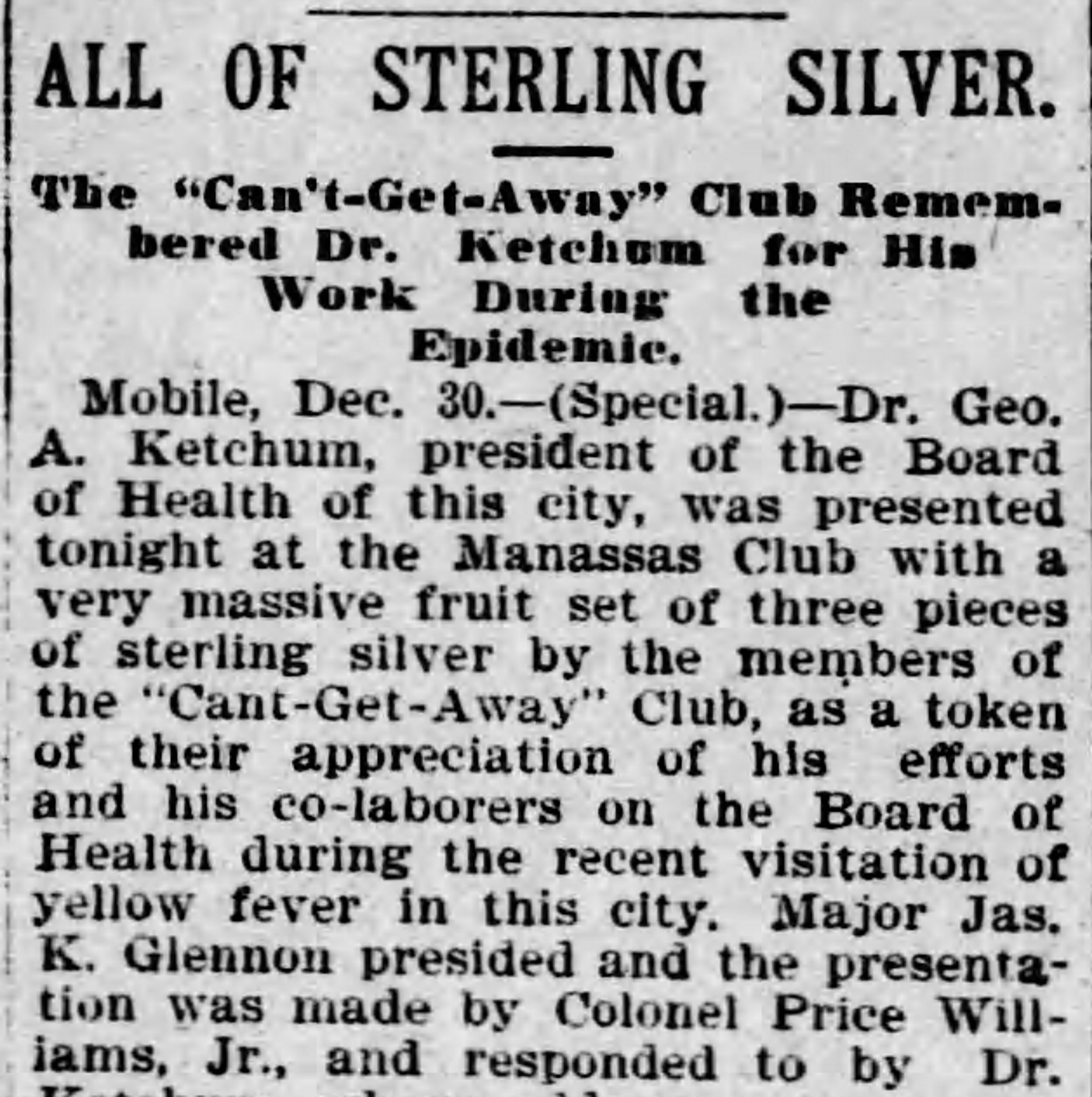
The Manassas Club Mobile Alabama The Montgomery Advertiser Fri Dec 31 1897

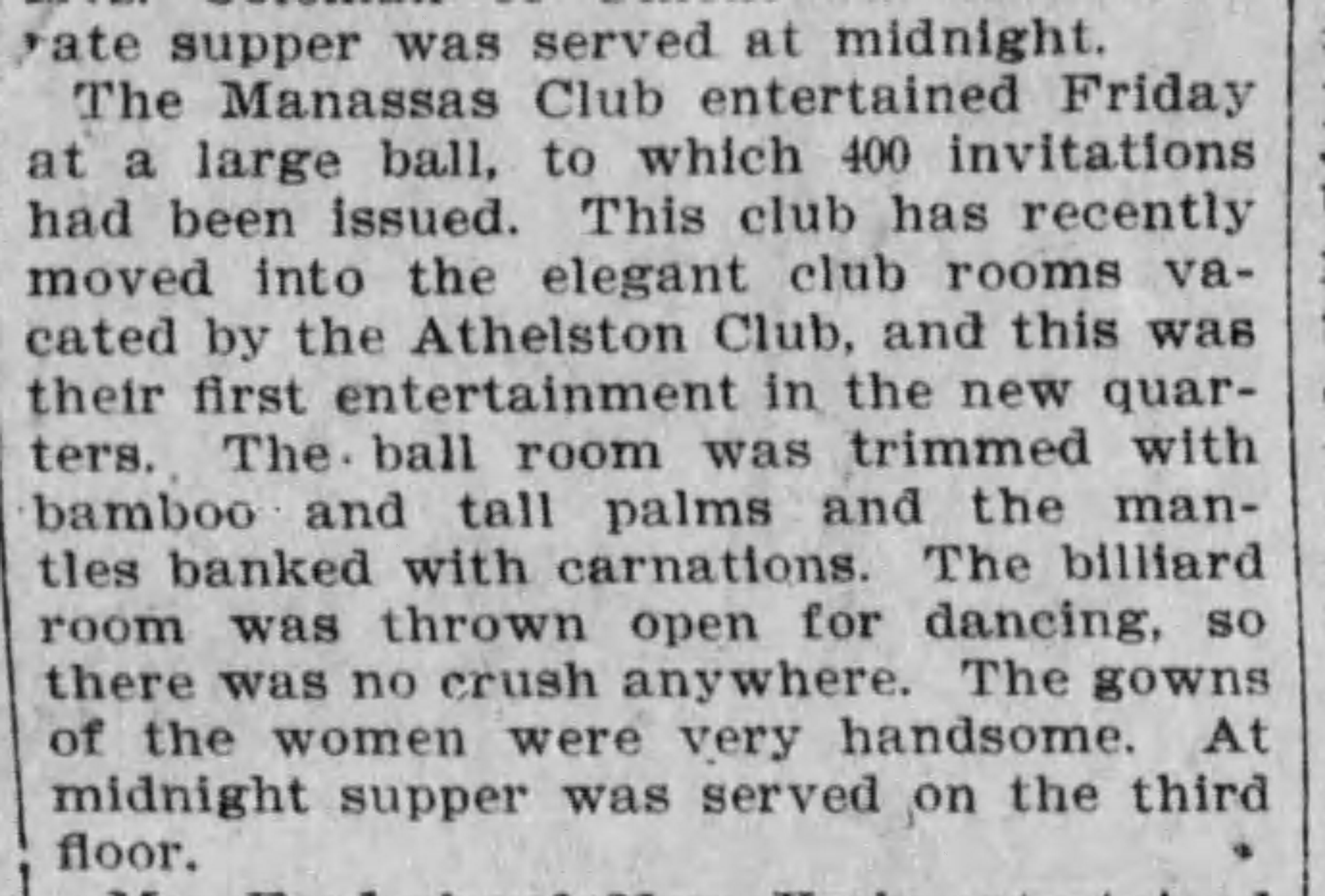
The Manassas Club Mobile Alabama The Age Herald Sun Feb 16 1902

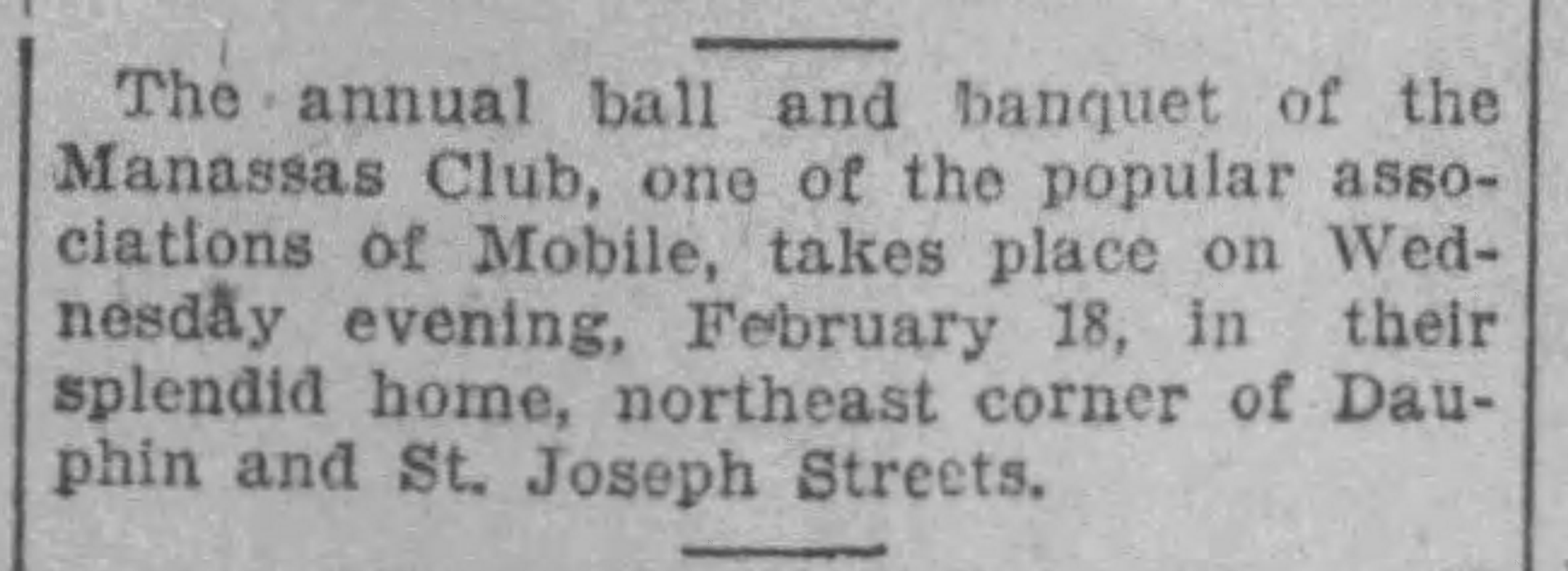
The Manassas Club Mobile Alabama The Montgomery Advertiser Wed Feb 11 1903

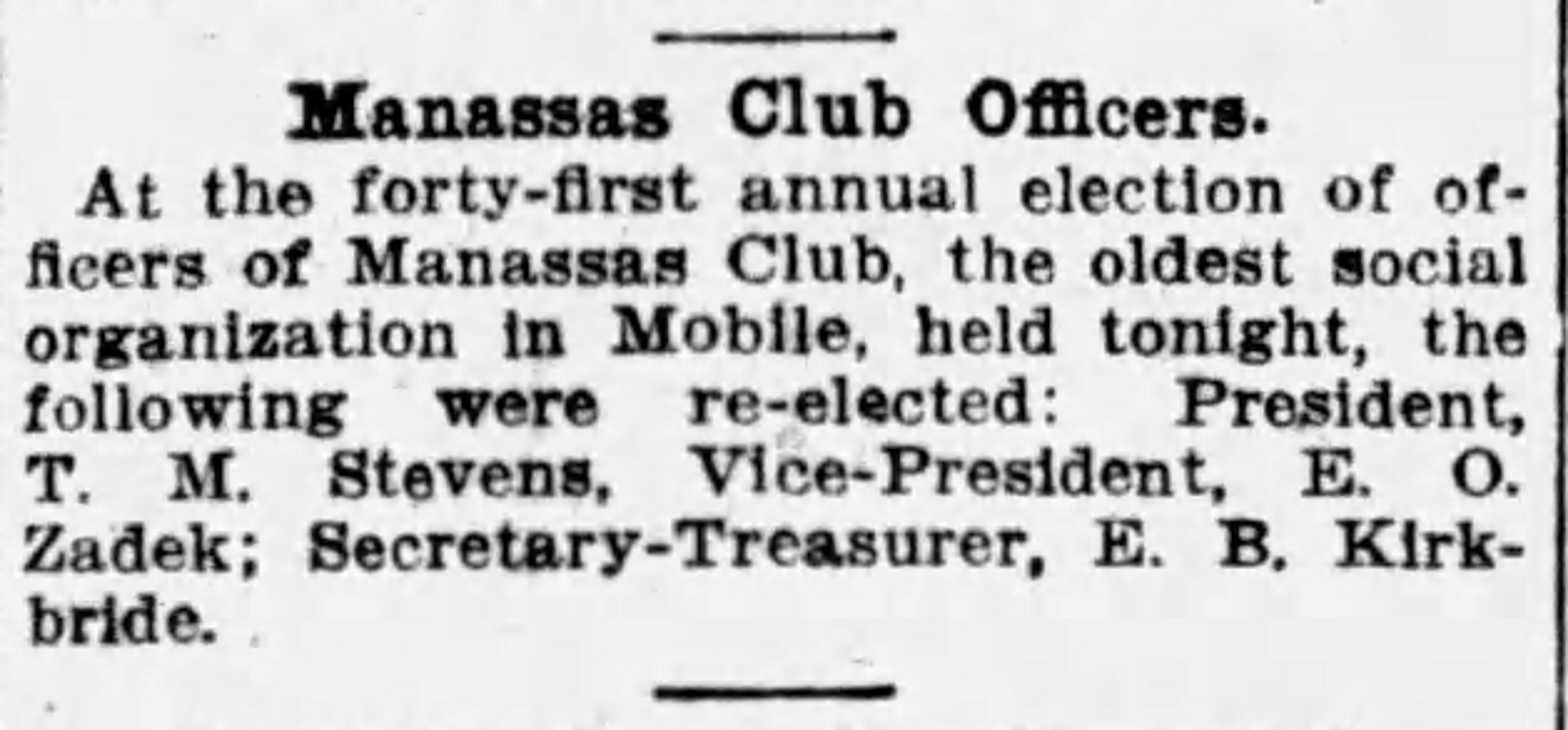
The Manassas Club Mobile Alabama The Montgomery Advertiser Sun Nov 29 1903

== See also ==
- The Athelstan Club
- Cowbellion de Rakin Society
- Striker's Independent Society
