= Protestant Children's Home =

- U.S. National Register of Historic Places
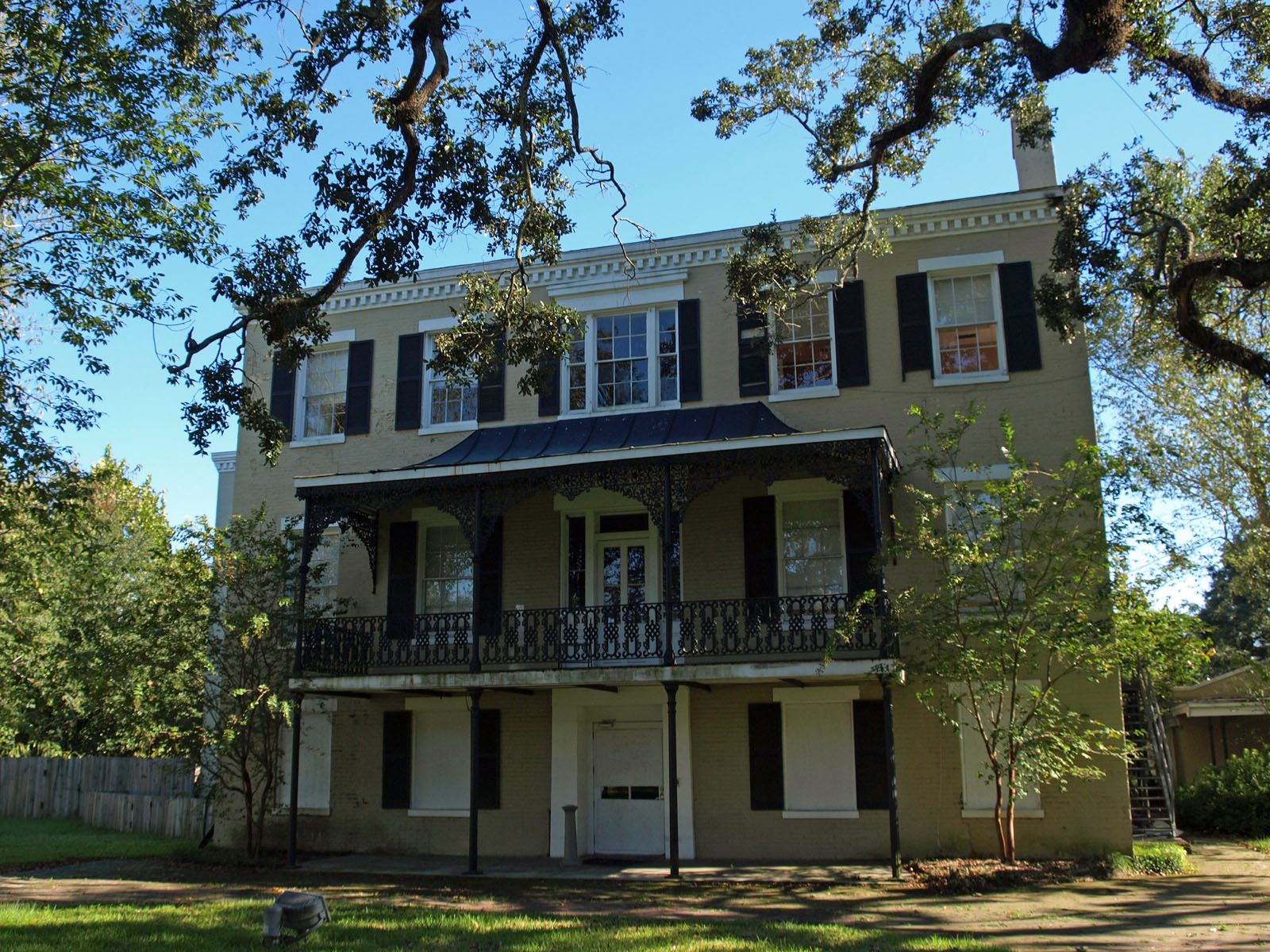
- The building in September 2012

- Location within Mobile, Alabama Location within Alabama Location within the United States
- Location: 911 Dauphin Street; Mobile, Alabama
- Coordinates: 30°41′14″N 88°3′20″W
- Area: 2 acres (0.81 ha)
- Built: 1845
- Architect: Henry Moffatt
- Architectural style: Late Federal
- NRHP reference No.: 73000364
- Added to NRHP: June 18, 1973

The Protestant Children's Home, also known as the Protestant Orphans' Asylum, is a historic orphanage building in Mobile, Alabama, United States. It was placed on the National Register of Historic Places on June 18, 1973.
In 2015 the building was leased to the Infant Mystics society which began using it as a meeting lodge, renaming the place Cotton Hall.

== History ==
The Protestant Children's Home was built for the Protestant Orphan Asylum Society, established on December 2, 1839, by women of various Protestant denominations for the care of Protestant children without parents. The yellow fever epidemics of 1837 and 1839 had created the need for an organization to care for the many orphaned children left afterward. Mobile during this time was a predominantly Roman Catholic city, with a Catholic orphanage and other support organizations already functional. Originally accepting children up to ten years old, the Protestant Orphan Asylum Society later accepted girls up to 18 years old and boys up to 14 years old.

== Design ==
Designed by Henry Moffatt, a Philadelphia architect, the cornerstone for the orphanage was laid on July 4, 1845. The three-story brick structure is designed in a Late Federal style. Built on a central hall plan, the main block features two primary floors above a full-height ground floor. The front facade is five bays wide, with a two-story cast iron portico centered on the middle three bays. The upper tier of the portico features an elaborate ironwork balustrade and latticework. Minor alterations were made to the building during the late 19th century, the rear portion was expanded in 1924, and a full-scale renovation was completed in 1950.
