= Bead Town =

American traveling art exhibit

Bead Town is a traveling art exhibit of 100 huge mosaics composed of recycled Mardi Gras beads. Created by carpenter and artist Stephan Wanger in New Orleans, Louisiana, Bead Town has been exhibited in Winnsboro, Louisiana, Natchitoches, Louisiana, and Gary, Indiana.
