= Cowbellion de Rakin Society =

Mobile Mystic Society

Cowbellion de Rakin
- Cowbellion de Rakin Invitation for December 1882
- Abbreviation: CdR
- Formation: 1830; 196 years ago
- Type: Mystic Society
- Location: Mobile, AL

The Cowbellion de Rakin Society was the first formally organized and masked mystic society in the United States to celebrate with a pedestrian parade in 1830.

== History ==
The Cowbellions got their start when a young merchant and cotton factor from Pennsylvania, Michael Krafft, began a parade with rakes, hoes, and cowbells. The Cowbellions introduced horse-drawn floats to the parades in 1840 with a parade entitled, "Heathen Gods and Goddesses.

== Gallery ==
1837 account of the Cowbellion celebrations of Christmas and New Year.

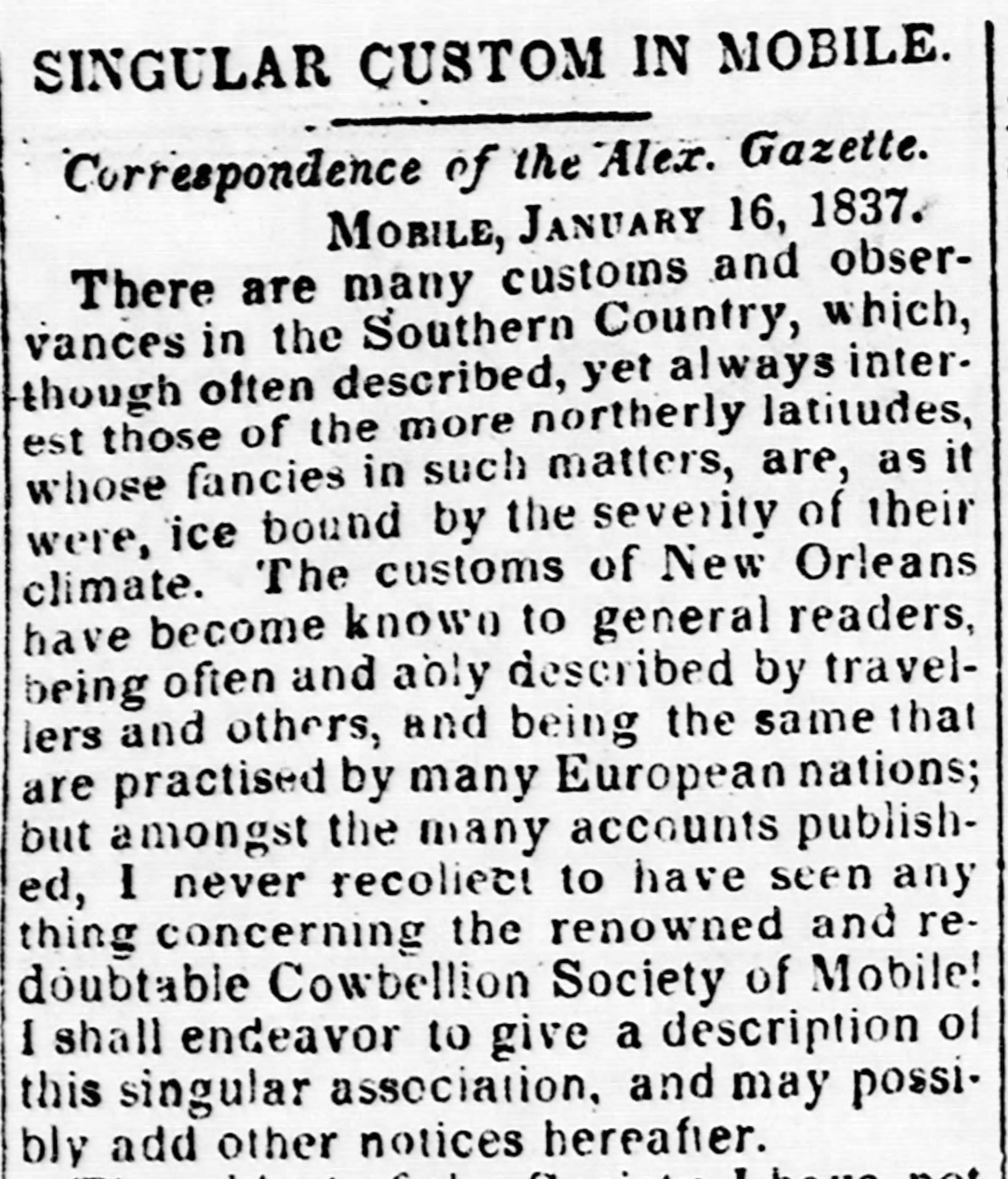
Cowbellion de Rakin Society Mobile Alabama Alexandria Gazette Fri Feb 3 1837

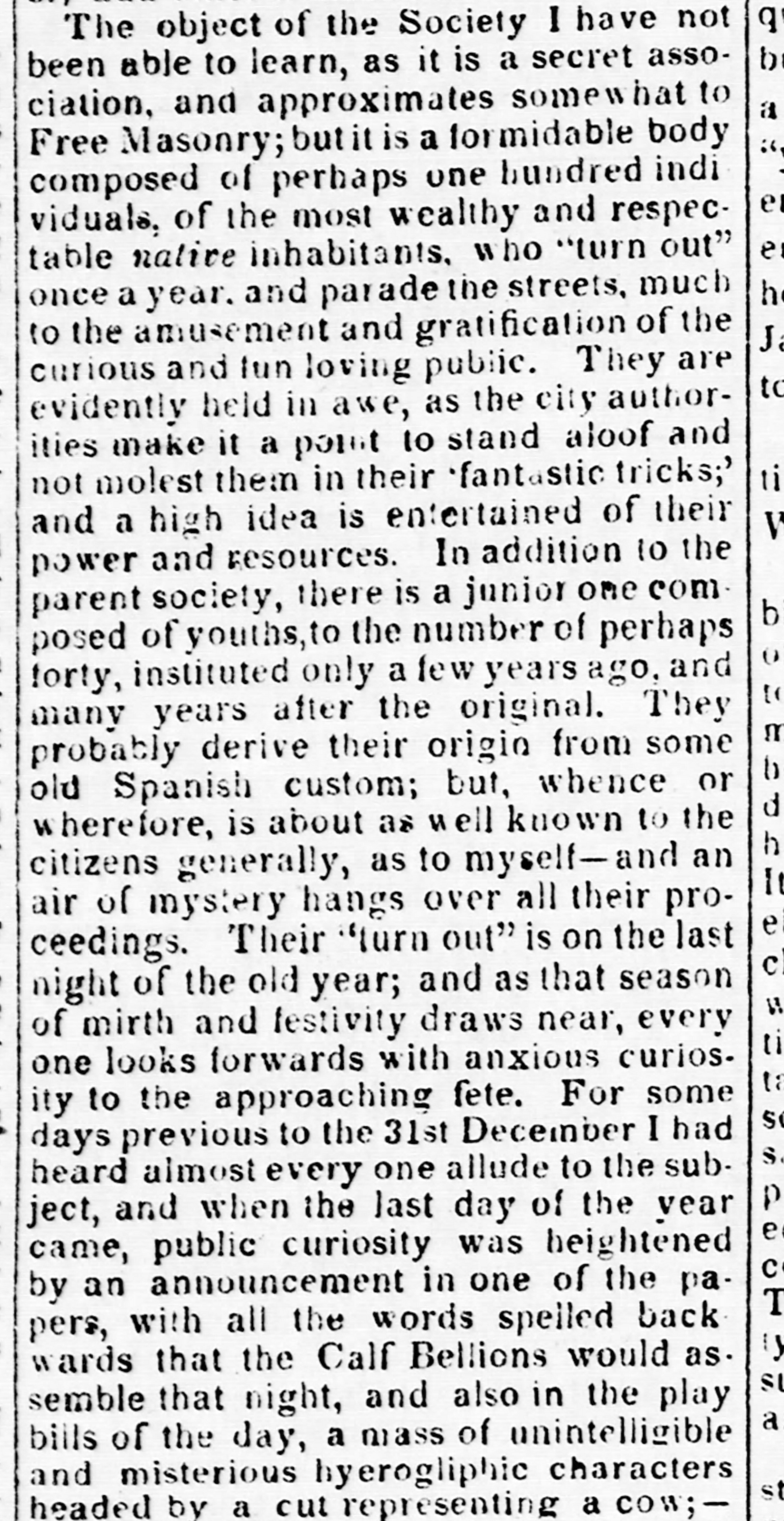
Cowbellion de Rakin Society Mobile Alabama Alexandria Gazette Fri Feb 3 1837 (1)

Cowbellion de Rakin Society Mobile Alabama Alexandria Gazette Fri Feb 3 1837 (2)

Cowbellion de Rakin Society Mobile Alabama Alexandria Gazette Fri Feb 3 1837 (3)

== See also ==
- Order of Myths
- Striker's Independent Society
- The Manassas Club
- Mistick Krewe
