= Mystic society =

Mardi Gras social organization in Mobile, Alabama

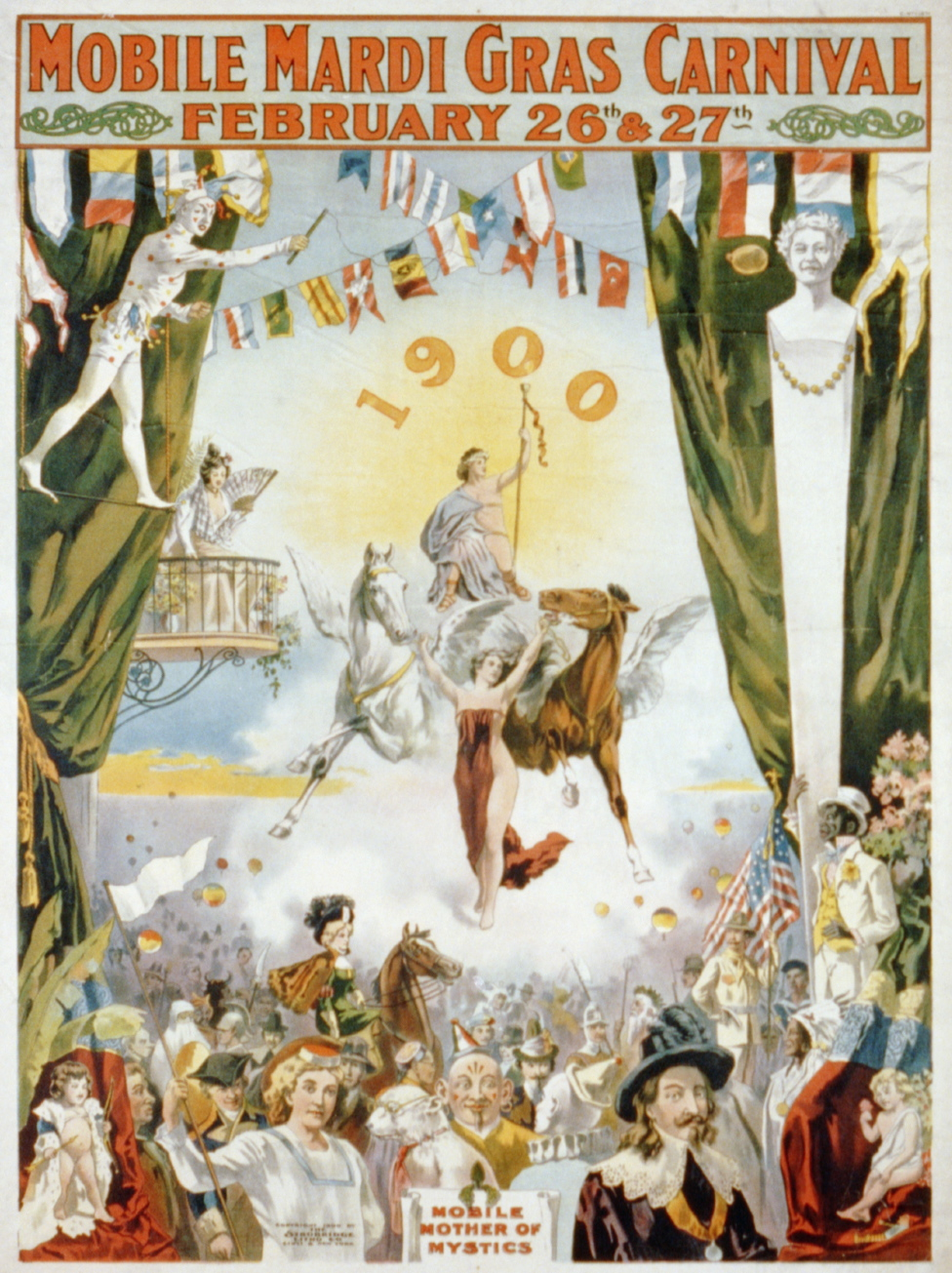
Mobile Carnival poster from 1900.

A mystic society is a Mardi Gras social organization in Mobile, Alabama, that presents parades and/or balls for the enjoyment of its members, guests, and the public. The New Orleans Krewe is patterned after Mobile's Mystics. The societies have been based in class, economic, and racial groups. Mobile's parading mystic societies build colorful Carnival floats and create costumes around each year's themes.

During the Carnival season, the mystic societies parade in costume on their floats throughout downtown Mobile. Masked society members toss small gifts, known as throws, to the parade spectators. The throws can take the form of trinkets, candy, cookies, peanuts, panties, artificial roses, stuffed animals, doubloons, cups, hats, can coolers, Frisbees, medallion necklaces, bead necklaces of every variety, and Moon Pies.

Mystic societies in Mobile give formal masquerade balls, known as bal masqués, which are almost always invitation only and are oriented to adults. Attendance at a ball requires that a strict dress code be followed that usually involves full-length evening gowns and white tie with tails for invited guests, and masked costumes for society members. The bal masqués feature dramatic entertainment, music, dancing, food, and drinks. Bal masqués are normally based on a theme which is carried out through scenery, decorations, and costumes. Some society balls also include a tableau vivant. Much of the memorabilia from these occasions can be viewed at the Mobile Carnival Museum.

== History ==
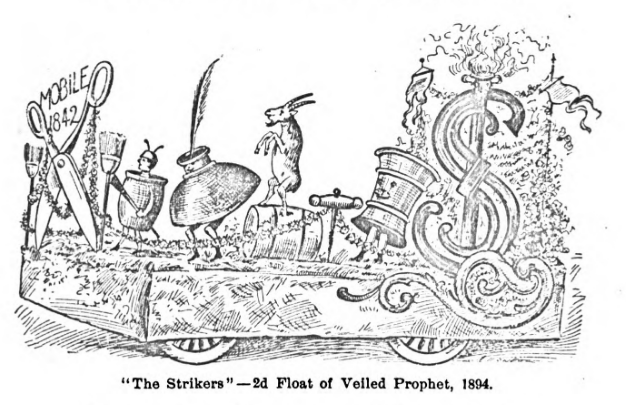
Striker's Independent Society 1894 Float

Mobile first celebrated Carnival in 1703 when French settlers began the festivities at the Old Mobile Site. Mobile's first informal Carnival society was organized in 1711 with the Boeuf Gras Society (Fatted Ox Society).

Mobile's Cowbellion de Rakin Society was the first formally organized and masked mystic society in the United States to celebrate with a parade in 1830. The Cowbellions got their start when a cotton factor from Pennsylvania, Michael Krafft began a parade with rakes, hoes, and cowbells. The Cowbellions introduced horse-drawn floats to the parades in 1840 with a parade entitled "Heathen Gods and Goddesses". The Striker's Independent Society was formed in 1842 and is the oldest surviving mystic society in the United States. The Determined Set was founded in 1844 but no longer exists. The idea of mystic societies was exported to New Orleans in 1856 when six businessmen, three who were formerly of Mobile, gathered at a club room in New Orlean's French Quarter to organize a secret society, inspired by the Cowbellion de Rakin Society, that would observe Mardi Gras with a formal parade. They founded New Orleans' first and oldest krewe, the Mistick Krewe of Comus. Carnival celebrations in Mobile were canceled during the American Civil War.

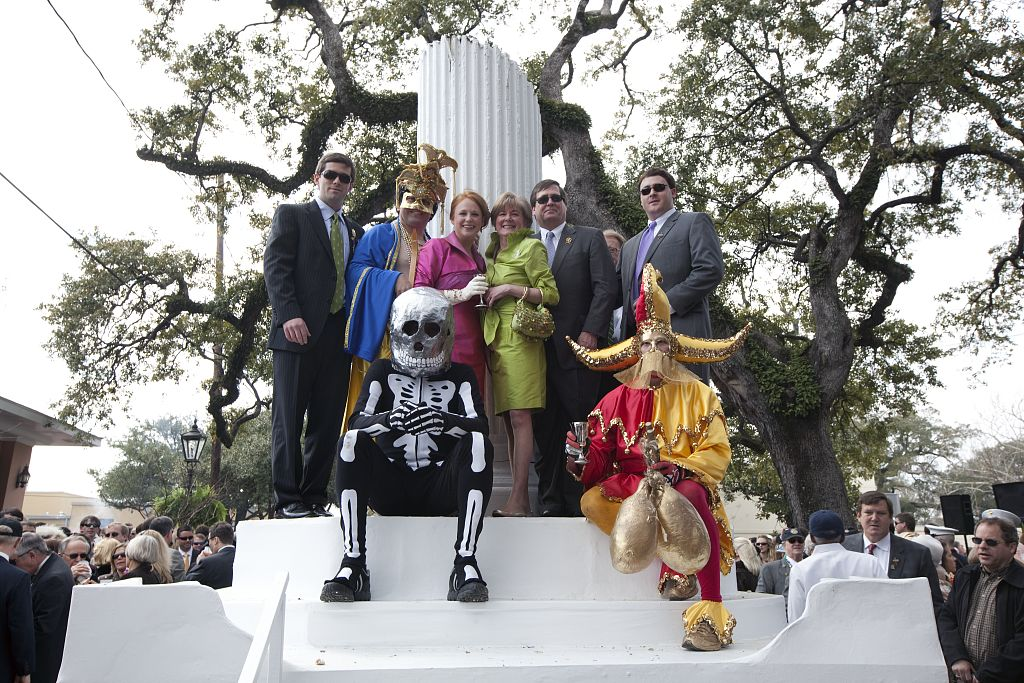
Order of Myths members and parade attendants in 2010.

Mardi Gras parades were revived in Mobile after the Civil War by Joe Cain in 1867, when he paraded through the city streets on Fat Tuesday while costumed as a fictional Chickasaw chief named Slacabamorinico. He irreverently celebrated the day in front of occupation Union Army troops. The Lost Cause Minstrels were founded in 1867 in Mobile. The Order of Myths, Mobile's oldest continuously parading mystic society, was founded in 1867 and held its first parade on Mardi Gras night in 1868. The Infant Mystics also begin to parade on Mardi Gras night in 1868, but later moved its parade to Lundi Gras (Fat Monday).

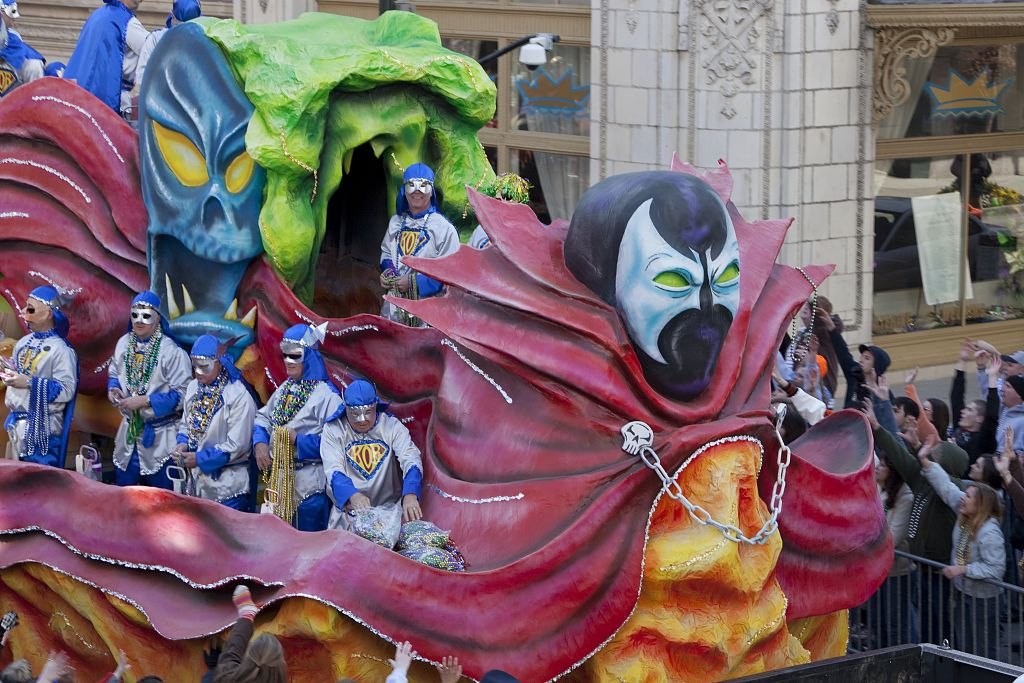
Knights of Revelry parade in 2010.

The Mobile Carnival Association (MCA) was formed in 1871 to coordinate the events of Mardi Gras; this year also saw the first Royal Court held with the first king of Carnival, Emperor Felix I. The Comic Cowboys of Wragg Swamp were established in 1884, along with their mission of satire and free expression. The Continental Mystic Crew mystic society was founded in 1890, it was Mobile's first Jewish mystic society. The Order of Doves mystic society was founded in 1894 and held its first Mardi Gras ball. It was the first organized African-American mystic society in Mobile. The first mystic of women was the M.W.M who held its first and likely only ball in 1890 and the first women's society to parade in the streets of Mobile was the Order of Polka Dots who rolled in 1950 just one night before its friendly rivals, the Maids of Mirth (MOMs).

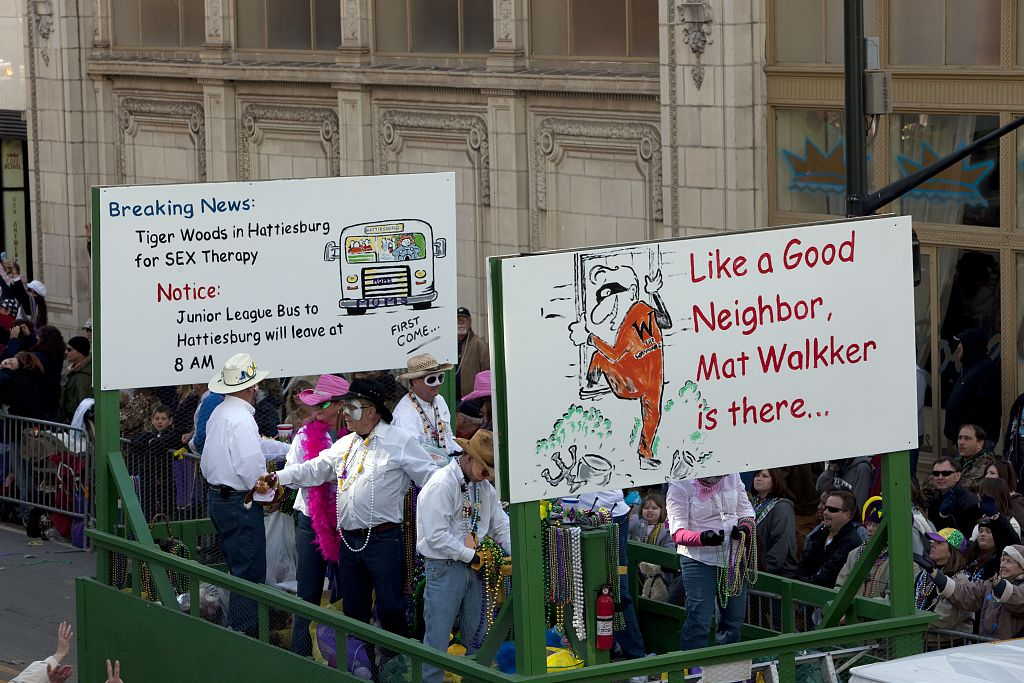
Comic Cowboys parade in 2010.

The Infant Mystics, the second oldest society that continues to parade, introduced the first electric floats to Mobile in 1929. The Colored Carnival Association was founded and had its first parade of societies in 1939; it was later named the Mobile Area Mardi Gras Association (MAMGA). The MAMGA installed the first African-American Mardi Gras court in 1940 with the coronation of King Elexis I and his queen. It coordinates events of African-American mystic societies.

Founded in 1961, Le Krewe De Bienville (LKDB) exists as Mobile's only civic and charitable organization with a mission statement to promote Mobile and its Mardi Gras. Following the lead of the little-known Krewe of Pan and Apostles of Apollo, societies comprising members of the city's gay and lesbian community, the Order of Osiris held its first ball in 1980. It is now one of the Carnival season's most anticipated balls and sought-after invitation.

The Mobile International Carnival Ball was first held in 1995, with every known Mobile mystic society in attendance. The Order of Outowners mystic society was founded in 2001 with the mission of being a more modern and inclusive society than the traditional ones, and offers ball tickets for sale to the general public. The Conde Explorers were founded as a parading mystic society in 2004, with the express mission of being open to all races and both genders. The Conde Explorers were one of several mystic societies featured in the 2008 documentary film, The Order of Myths. It reveals Mobile's Carnival preparations and celebrations, the beauties and joys, as well as the complex racial history of the city and its mystic societies.

== Past and present societies ==
Some of the mystic societies in Mobile (not all):

- Apostles of Apollo
- Ancient Society of Mystics
- Belles and Beaux
- Blue Birds
- Boeuf Gras Society
- Cain's Merry Widows
- Cain's Twelfth Night Society
- Chickasaw War Party
- Comic Cowboys
- Comrades Club
- Conde Cavaliers
- Conde Explorers
- Continental Mystic Crew
- Court of Isabella
- Cowbellion de Rakin Society
- Crewe of Columbus
- Dominoes
- Don Donas
- Emeralds
- Etruscans
- Fifty Funny Fellows
- Follies
- Followers of Apolla
- Forty-Niners
- Harlequins
- Imperial Fun Makers
- Independent Fun Lovers
- Infant Mystics
- Joe Cain Marching Society
- Jokers Wild
- Kickshaw Society
- Knights of Daze
- Knights of Ebony
- Knights of Folly
- Knights of Glory
- Knights of Joy
- Knights of May Zulu Club
- Knights of Mobile
- Knights of Pegasus
- Knights of Revelry
- Krewe of Admiral Semmes
- Krewe of Columbus
- Krewe of Don Q
- Krewe of Elks
- Krewe of Marry Mates
- Krewe of Mohomet
- Krewe of Phoenix
- Krewe of Venus
- La Luna Servante
- Le Krewe de Bienville
- Les Bons Vivants
- Les Femmes Cassettes
- Maids of Mirth
- Marquis de Lafayette Societie
- Mardi Gras Pilgrims
- Masters of the Old World
- Merry Evening Maskers
- MiKrafft Association (MKA)
- Midnight Maskers
- Midnight Merry Makers
- Midnight Mystics
- Mistresses of Joe Cain
- Mobile Married Mystics
- Mobile Mystics
- Mobile Rifles
- Monday Evening Maskers
- Monday Mystics
- Mystic Krewe of Myrthe
- Mystic Krewsaders
- Mystic Maskers
- Mystic Stripers Society
- Mobile's Mystical Ladies
- Mystics
- Mystics of Time
- Mystical Belles
- Neptune's Daughters
- Nereides
- New Mobilians
- Order of Angels
- Order of Athena
- Order of Butterfly Maidens
- Order of Dead Rock Stars
- Order of Doves
- Order of Dragons
- Order of Druids
- Order of Imps
- Order of Inca
- Order of Isis
- Order of Jesters
- Order of Juno
- Order of LaShe's
- Order of Mardi Gras Maskers
- Order of Myths
- Order of Orioles
- Order of Osiris
- Order of Outowners
- Order of Pan
- Order of Polka Dots
- Order of Shiners
- Order of Venus
- Original Dragons
- Original Social Utopia Club
- Pharaohs
- Phifty Phunny Phellows
- Pierrettes
- Resurrected Cowbellion de Rakin Society
- S.C.S. a.k.a. Santa Claus Society
- Sauvettes Social Club
- Sirens
- Société du Bœuf Gras
- Sons and Daughters of Joe Cain
- Sons of Cyreniac
- Sons of Saturn
- Spinsters
- Strikers Club
- Striker's Independent Society
- Strikers Social Club
- Tea Drinker's Society
- Thalians
- The Tillmans Tricksters
- The Tombstone Kids
- Utopia Club
