= Order of Myths =

American Mardi Gras organization

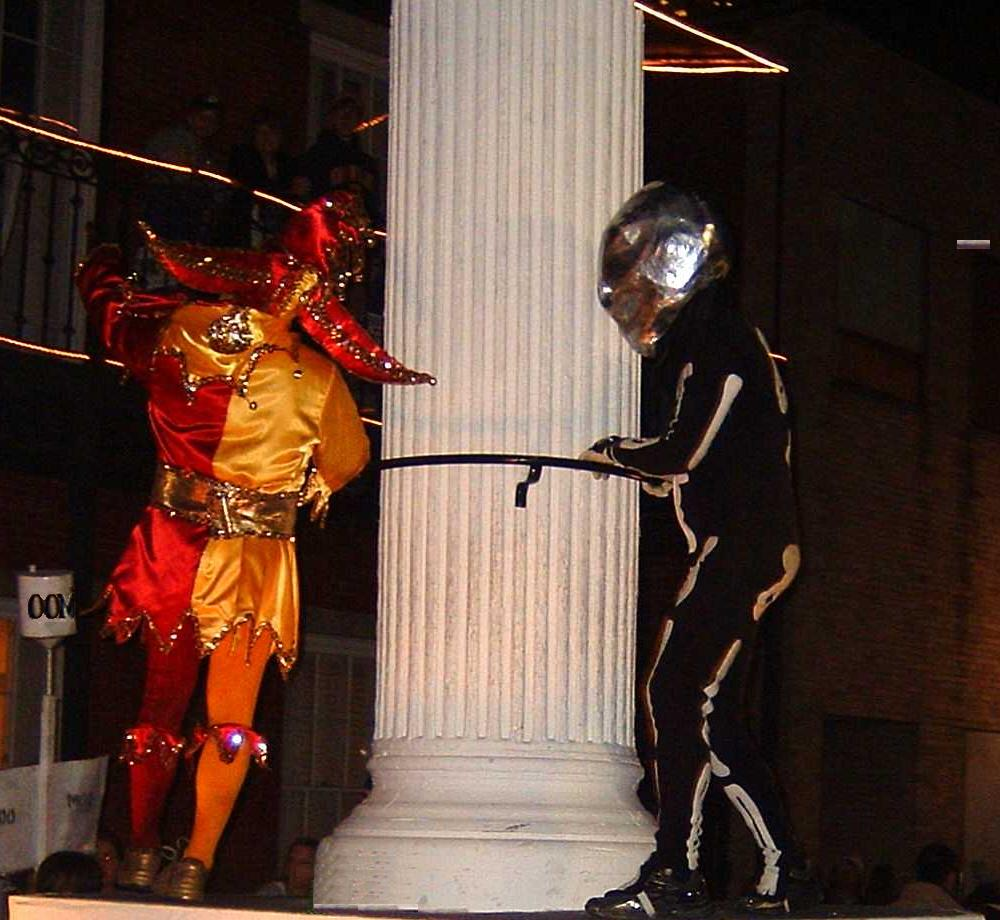
Order of Myths, 2007: Folly chasing Death

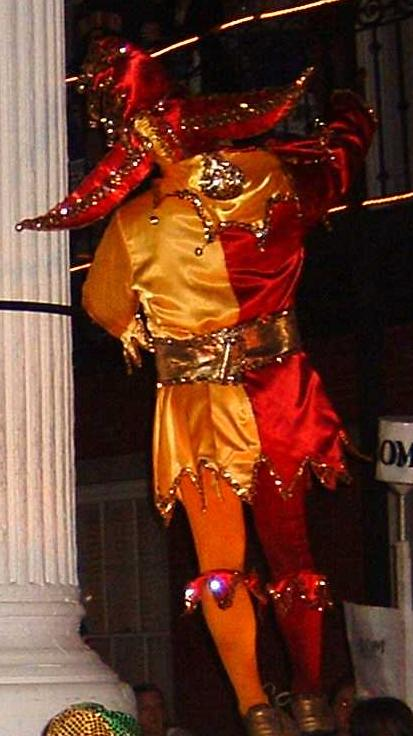
Folly: Order of Myths 2007

The Order of Myths, (OOMs) founded in 1867, is the second oldest mystic society to celebrate Mardi Gras in Mobile, Alabama, after the Striker's Independent Society. It is the oldest continuously parading mystic society in Mobile. The Order of Myths chose, as its symbolic emblem, Folly chasing Death around a broken column of life. During parades, a person dressed in a jester's suit, as Folly, chases a person dressed in a skeleton suit as Death, around a Greek column on the emblem float. At the conclusion of the traditional OOM parade, Death is defeated, and Folly wins the day.

The first parading mystic society, the Cowbellion de Rakin Society, formed in 1830-1831, was disbanded in the early 1900s but has since been re-created circa 1990. The oldest known mystic society in the history of Mobile was the Boeuf Gras Society, founded in 1711, but it ceased in 1861, during the American Civil War, as later Mobile was occupied by Union troops and all public activities were heavily restricted.

== See also ==
- Striker's Independent Society
- Cowbellion de Rakin Society
