= Striker's Independent Society =

Mobile Mystic Society

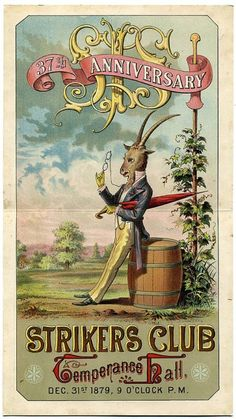
- 37th Anniversary Ball Invitation
- Abbreviation: S.I.S.
- Formation: 1843; 183 years ago
- Type: Mystic Society
- Location: Mobile, AL

The Striker's Independent Society (SIS) is the oldest continuously active mystic society in Mobile, founded in 1843 (during Mobile's first American period), Alabama. Mobile's Mardi Gras history spans over 300 years, as customs changed with the ruling nations: Mobile was the capital of French Louisiana in 1702, then British in 1763, then Spanish in 1780, entered the Republic of Alabama, was declared American in 1812 (captured in 1813), a U.S. state in 1819, then Confederate in 1860, then became American again in 1865 and participated in Carnival during New Year's Eve and New Year's Day celebrations. It is the oldest remaining mystic society in America but no longer hosts an annual parade.

== History ==
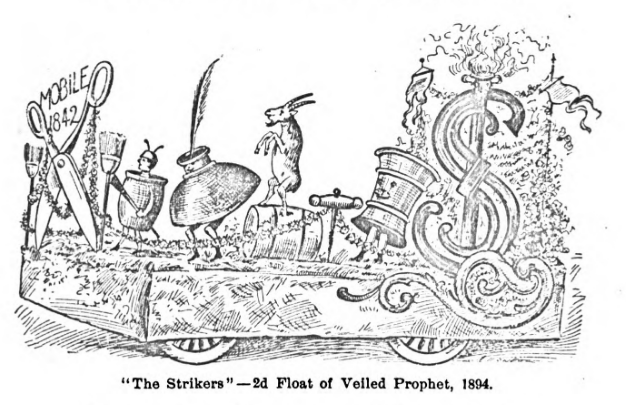
Striker's Independent Society 1894 Float

The Strikers Independent Society was formed initially by young men in Mobile who had been refused membership to the older Cowbellion de Rakin Society (which had been formed in year 1830 by "more sedate and astute men of the city"). In the beginning, it was designated as a bachelor-only society, and if a member married, then they were out of the society. The Strikers, like the Cowbellions, paraded only on New Year's Eve and held their ball on New Year's Day.

In 1852, they became the first mystic society to hold a ball at the Battle House Hotel. By 1881, the Strikers Independent Society had discontinued their annual street parades, but continued to hold a grand ball on New Year's Eve, though in 1884, they paraded once more.

In 1902, their theme was "Colonial Mobile" celebrating the bicentennial of Mobile's founding (1702). Members wore costumes representing the French, British, Spanish, and American periods of Mobile's history.

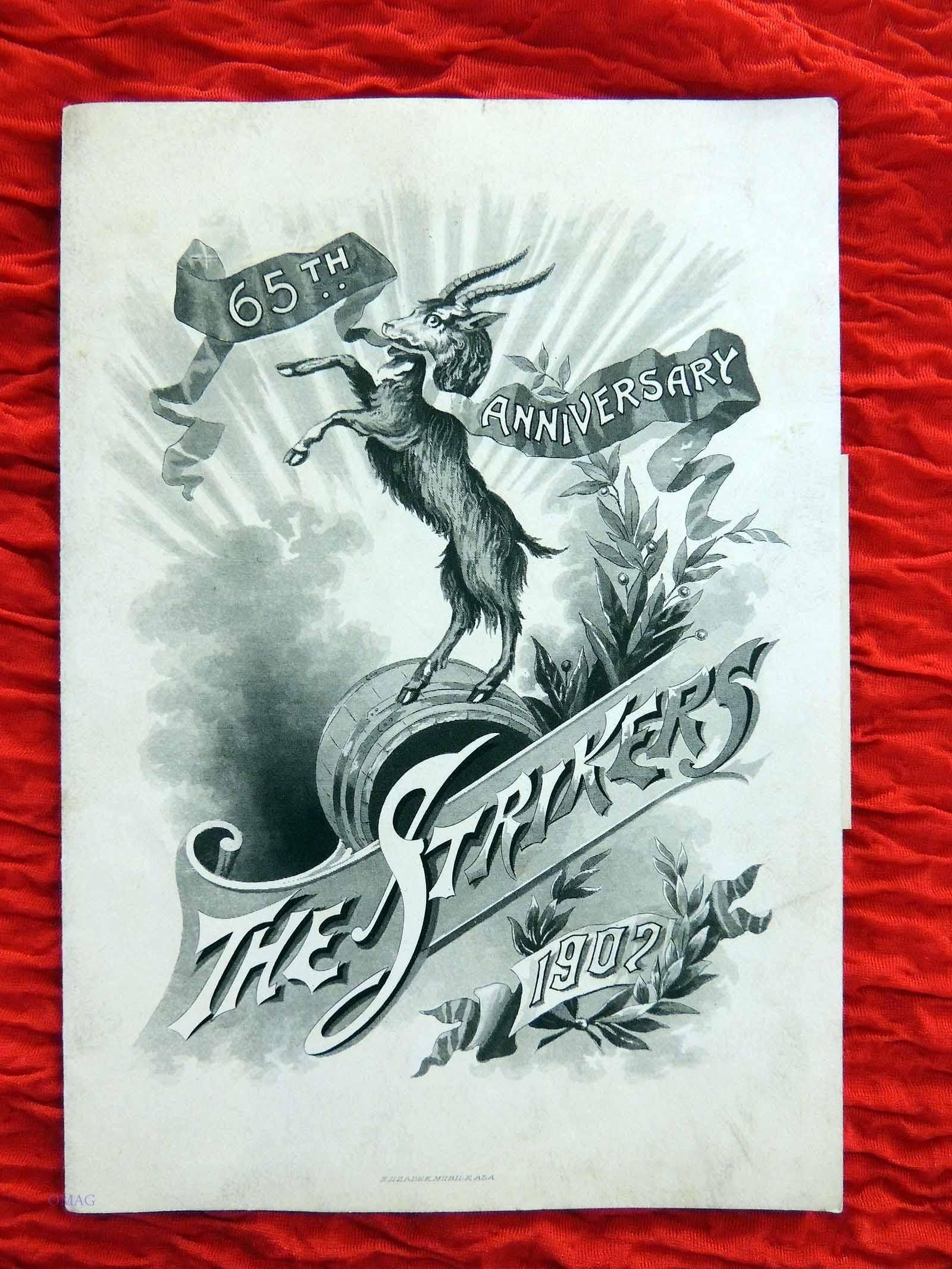
Striker's Independent Society Invitation 65th Anniversary

== Offshoots in New Orleans ==
Just as New Orleans became the capital of French Louisiana (Louisianne) about twenty years (1723) after Mobile (1702), the mystic societies of New Orleans were created by Mobile society members about 20 years after the original Mobile societies had been founded:

- 1850: Joseph Ellison, a Mobile Cowbellion, is one of six Mobilians who moved to New Orleans and organized the Crescent City's first mystic societies; Ellison forms "The Mistick Krewe of Comus" in New Orleans (1850).
- 1870: Sidney Smith, the son of a Striker (in Mobile), organized the "Twelfth Night Revelers" in New Orleans, nearly 30 years after the Strikers Independent Society was formed in Mobile.

The other mystic societies had a reciprocal effect in Mobile from New Orleans, when they paraded in 1865 while Mobile parades had been discontinued due to the Civil War, for they inspired Joe Cain to return to Mobile, in the midst of the Union Army occupation, and revive the Mardi Gras celebration in Mobile, where it had started back in 1703.

== See also ==
- Joe Cain Day
- Mardi Gras in Mobile
- Cowbellion de Rakin Society
- Mistick Krewe
