= Cain's Merry Widows =

Mardi Gras mystic society in Mobile, Alabama

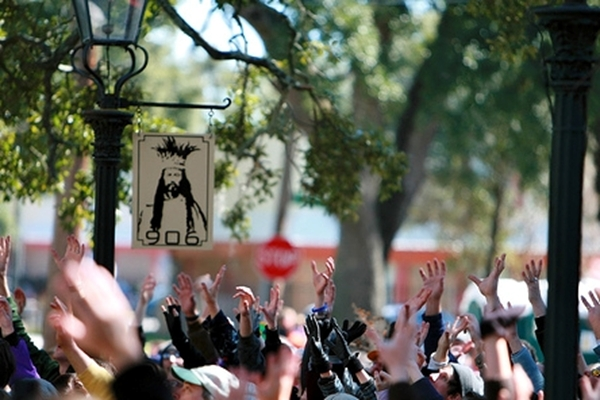
Cain's Merry Widows paying a visit to Joe Cain's house on Augusta Street in 2007

The Mardi Gras mystic society of Cain's Merry Widows (a women's mystic society) was founded in 1974 in Mobile, Alabama, home of the first Mardi Gras in America (1703). The organization celebrates 50 years in 2024. Each Mardi Gras, The ladies, known variously as "The Merry Widows of Joe Cain", "Joe Cain's Widows", or even just as "The Widows" gather on Joe Cain Day (the Sunday before Fat Tuesday), clothed in black mourning clothes with veils, to lay a wreath at Cain's burial site at Church Street Graveyard, wail over their "departed husband's" grave, then travel to Joe Cain's former house on Augusta Street to offer a toast and eulogy to their "Beloved Joe".

The Huntsville-based band, The Pine Hill Haints, perform a song titled "The Merry Widows of Joe Cain" which, in its lyrics, pays homage to Joe Cain, Mardi Gras tradition, and the city of Mobile itself. The band also makes it a yearly tradition to perform in Mobile each Joe Cain Day.

== See also ==
- Mardi Gras in Mobile
