= Mobile Carnival Museum =

Coordinates: 30.688919°N 88.044902°W

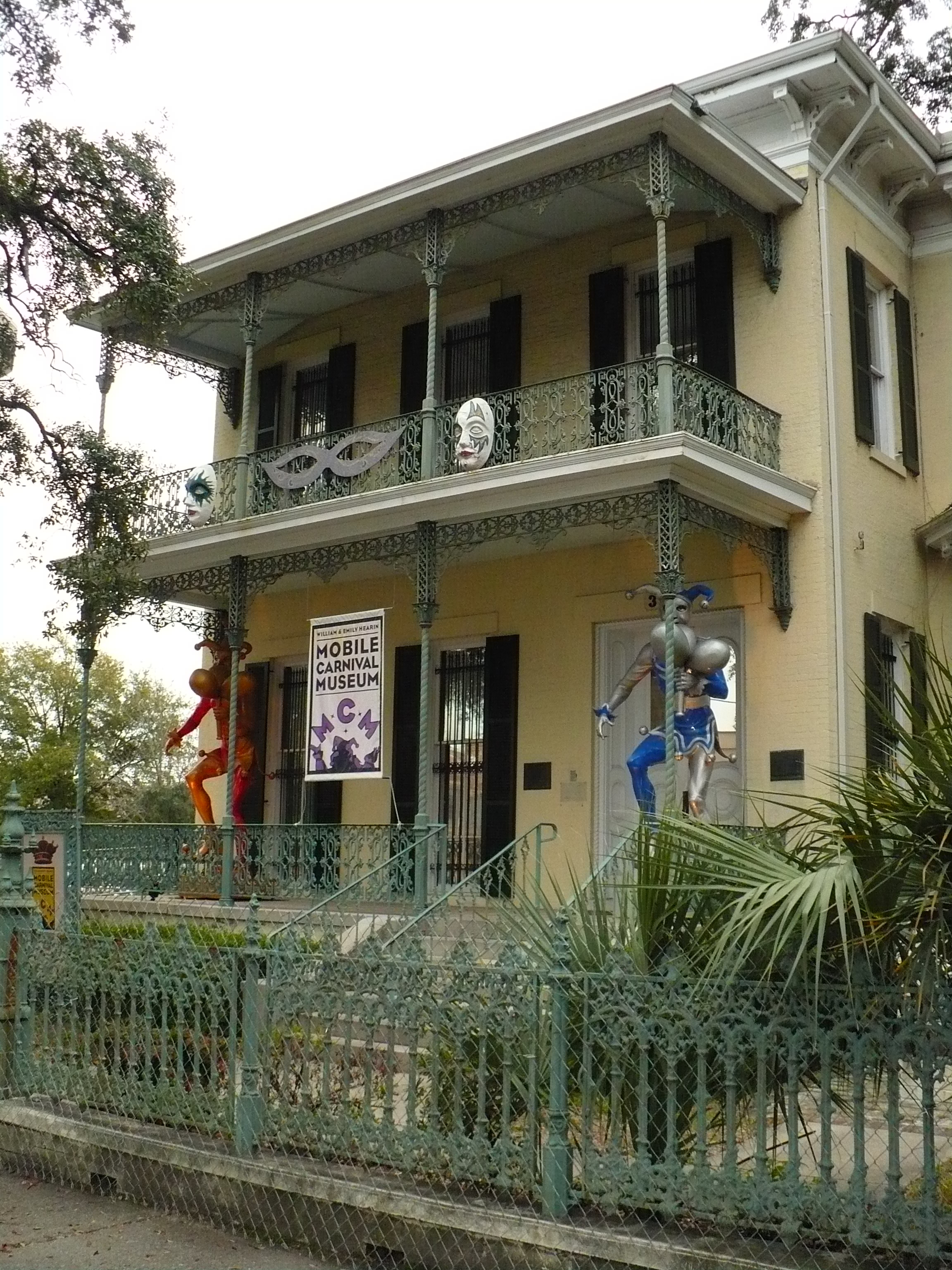
- Established: 2005
- Location: 355 Government Street; Mobile, Alabama, USA
- Type: History museum
- Director: Judi F. Gulledge
- Curator: Edward B. Ladd
- Public transit access: Yes
- Website: Mobile Carnival Museum

The Mobile Carnival Museum is a history museum that chronicles over 300 years of Carnival and Mardi Gras in Mobile, Alabama. The museum is housed in the historic Bernstein-Bush mansion on Government Street in downtown Mobile.

== Features ==
The museum features displays that tell the story of how the local celebration evolved from its early days to the modern tradition it has become. The Queen's Gallery houses gowns, trains, and jewels worn by the queens of Carnival. Also on display is the attire of a 1920s flapper queen, as well as costumes of several jesters of well-known parading societies. The collections also include original Mardi Gras art and posters by various area artists, doubloons, tableau designs, and ball invitations. The mansion's former carriage house contains interactive exhibits, including one that allows visitors to "ride" and throw doubloons from a Carnival float.

== See also ==
- Mardi Gras in Mobile
- Mystic society
