= Joe Cain =

Reviver of Mardi Gras in Mobile (1832–1904)

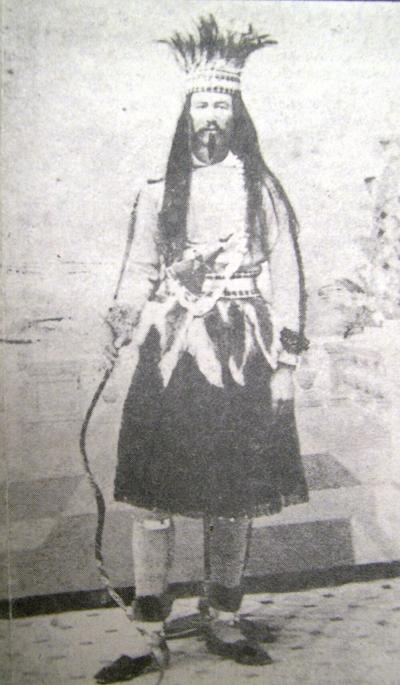
Joe Cain as "Slacabamorinico"

Joseph Stillwell Cain Jr. (October 10, 1832 – April 17, 1904) was an American Confederate military veteran largely credited with initiating the modern way of observing Mardi Gras and its celebrations in Mobile, Alabama, following the Civil War.

In 1868, while Mobile was still under Union occupation, Joe Cain paraded through the streets of Mobile, dressed in improvised costume as a fictional "Chickasaw" chief named Slacabamorinico. The choice was an attempt to insult to U.S. Army forces in that it was believed by some that the Chickasaw tribe had never been defeated in war.

Joe was joined at some point by six other Confederate veterans, parading in a decorated coal wagon, playing drums and horns, and the group became the "L. C. Minstrel Band", now commonly referred to as the "Lost Cause Minstrels" of Mobile.

== Life and work ==
Joseph Stillwell Cain, Jr. was born on October 10, 1832, along Dauphin Street in Mobile, Alabama. He married Elizabeth Alabama Rabby. He helped to organize the T.D.S. (Tea Drinker's Society), one of Mobile's mystic societies, in 1846; however, their banquets were part of Mobile's New Year's Eve celebrations, rather than being held on Mardi Gras day. Other groups had developed Mardi Gras parades, but the Civil War had brought them to a halt.

Cain was in New Orleans in 1867 for the Fireman's Day parade. He stayed over until the next day which was Mardi Gras that year, saw the celebration in the streets, and he returned to Mobile determined to revive the spirits of the citizens and to create a similar celebration of Mardi Gras for the people. He conceived the fictional character of Chief Slacabamorinico ("slaka-BAM orin-ah-CO") while he was the city clerk at the city market.

Dressed in costume with a plaid skirt and feathered headdress, Cain paraded through the city streets on a Tuesday in 1868, celebrating the day in front of the citizens of the city and Union Army troops.

A band of fellow Confederate veterans (including Thomas Burke, Rutledge Parham, John Payne, John Bohanan, Barney O'Rourke, and John Maguire) later accompanied Joe Cain as "Old Slac" riding through town on a decorated coal wagon, playing horns and drums, parading and celebrating. The group became known as the "Lost Cause Minstrels Band" in Mobile.

The first appearance of Joe Cain occurred the afternoon in the same year as the evening parade of the Order of Myths (OOM), the final parade each year.. Joe Cain was one of the founders of the New Year's Eve mystic society the T.D.S., and he built a tradition of Mardi Gras parades.

Joe Cain, who had played Old Slac until 1879, died in 1904 and was buried in the fishing village of Bayou La Batre (Alabama). Julian Lee "Judy" Rayford arranged to have Joe Cain reburied in Mobile's Church Street Graveyard in 1966, and he established Joe Cain Day in 1967 by walking at the head of a jazz funeral down Government Street to the cemetery.

Joe Cain's wife, Elizabeth Alabama Rabby Cain, died 3 years later, in 1907 at Bayou La Batre, and she is also re-buried, beside him. Joe and Elizabeth are two of the few, if only, people known to have been buried three times as both bodies were moved after the re-interment in the old Church Street Graveyard the following year to be nearer to his parents' graves.

== Gravesite ==
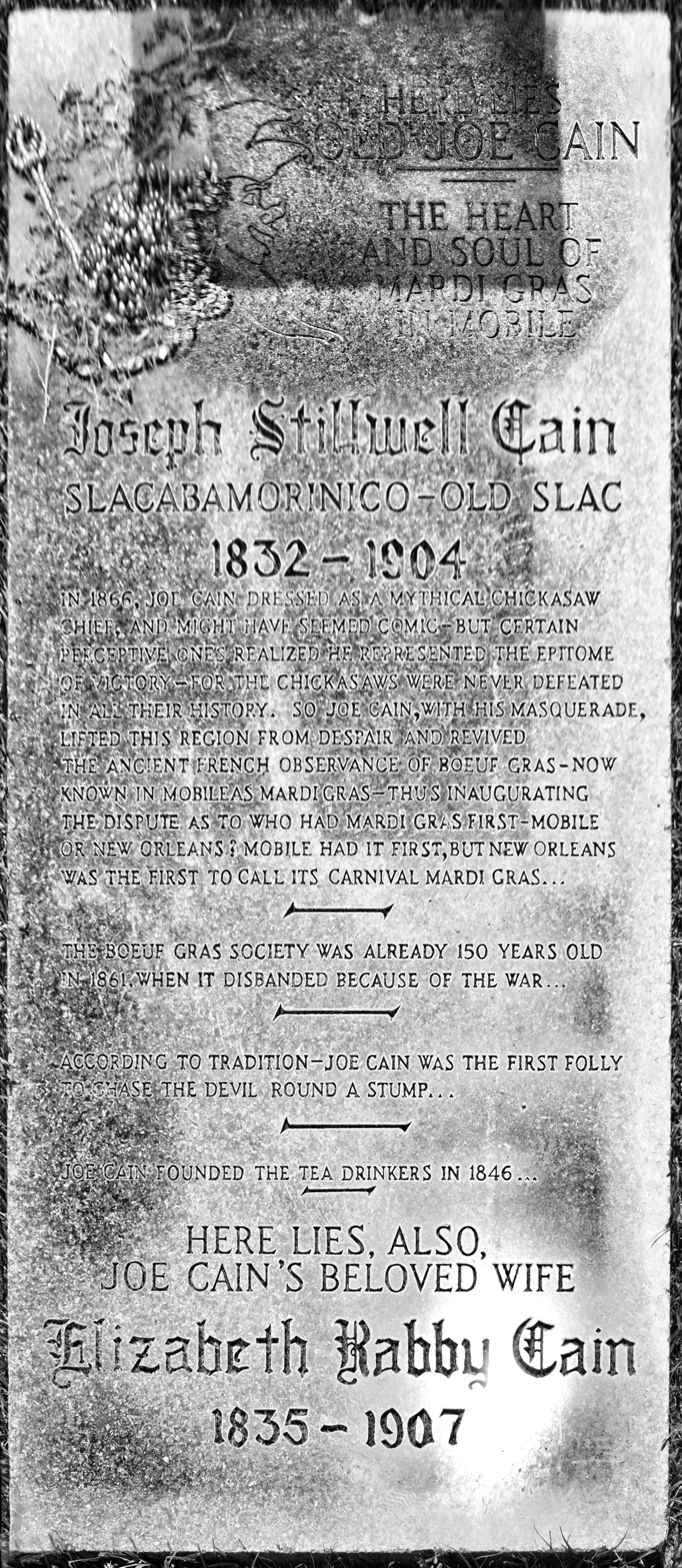
Joe Cain's gravestone in the Church Street Cemetery, Mobile, AL

Joe Cain is buried in the Church Street Graveyard in downtown Mobile, Alabama. His gravestone carries the inscription:

Here lies old Joe Cain

The heart and soul of Mardi Gras in Mobile

Joseph Stillwell Cain

Slacabamorinico - Old Slac

1832 - 1904

In 1866 (sic.), Joe Cain dressed as a mythical Chickasaw Chief, and might have seemed comic - but certain perceptive ones realized he represented the epitome of victory - for the Chickasaws were never defeated in all their history. So Joe Cain, with his masquerade, lifted this region from despair and revived the ancient French observance of Boeuf Gras - now known in Mobile as Mardi Gras - thus inaugurating the dispute as to who had Mardi Gras first - Mobile or New Orleans?

Mobile had it first, but New Orleans was the first to call its carnival Mardi Gras...

The Boeuf Gras Society was already 150 years old in 1861, when it disbanded because of the war...

According to tradition - Joe Cain was the first folly to chase the devil round a stump...

Joe Cain founded the Tea Drinkers in 1846...

Here lies, also, Joe Cain's beloved Wife

Elizabeth Rabby Cain

1835 - 1907

== Joe Cain Day ==

The Sunday before Fat Tuesday, Joe Cain Day is celebrated as part of the scheduled Mardi Gras celebrations in Mobile, with its center being the Joe Cain Procession (never called a parade). This has been called "The People's Parade" because it is performed by citizens without being run by a specific Mardi Gras krewe. Originally, anybody who showed up at the parade start on Sunday morning could join in with whatever makeshift float they could cobble together. Eventually, the sheer size and the city's desire to have all the Carnival parades conform to the same set of rules forced the organizers to limit the participants to a preset limit. The parade is preceded with the visit of the "Cain's Merry Widows" to the gravesite of their "departed husband" (described below).

Julian Lee "Judy" Rayford established Joe Cain Day in 1967 by walking at the head of a jazz funeral, along with his beloved dog Rosie (the only dog to ever lead a Mardi Gras parade in Mobile) down Government Street to the Church Street Graveyard, where he had arranged to have Joe Cain and his wife reburied in 1966. When Joe Cain was disinterred from Bayou La Batre, Julian brought Joe Cain's skull back to Mobile in the pocket of his coat, and that is considered to be the first "passing of the feathers" to the next person to wear the headdress in Mardi Gras, as "Slacabamorinico, chief of the Chickasaw."

The feathers were passed in 1970 to Fireman J.B. "Red" Foster who, attired in Plains Indian fashion, led the procession for 16 years. He then passed the feathers, tomahawk and peace pipe to author, historian, public relations, marketing professional and pastor, Bennett Wayne Dean Sr. in 1985. Old Slac IV "hisself" marked his 30th anniversary under the feathers during Joe Cain Day in 2015 noting that he "was just getting started." The feathers are always passed from "Chief to Chief" and it is his choice only - no other individual or any organization has any say in the selection of a new "Chief Slacabamorinico," a tradition unique to Mobile and its Mardi Gras.

The impression that the celebration had on a couple of visitors from California resulted in Joe Cain Days being officially recognized, in 1993, as a sister celebration by the Joe Cain Society of California in Nevada City, California each Mardi Gras.

The Mardi Gras mystic society of "Cain's Merry Widows" (a women's mystic society) was founded in 1974 in Mobile, Alabama. Each Mardi Gras, on Joe Cain Day (the Sunday before Fat Tuesday), members of this society dress in funereal black with veils, lay a wreath at Cain's burial site in Church Street Graveyard to wail over their "departed husband's" grave, then travel to Joe Cain's house on Augusta Street to offer a toast and eulogy to their "beloved Joe," continuously arguing over which widow was his favorite.

== See also ==
- Mardi Gras in Mobile - main article about Mobile's Mardi Gras festival.
- Cain's Merry Widows
