= Mardi Gras in Mobile, Alabama =

Annual carnival celebration in Mobile, Alabama

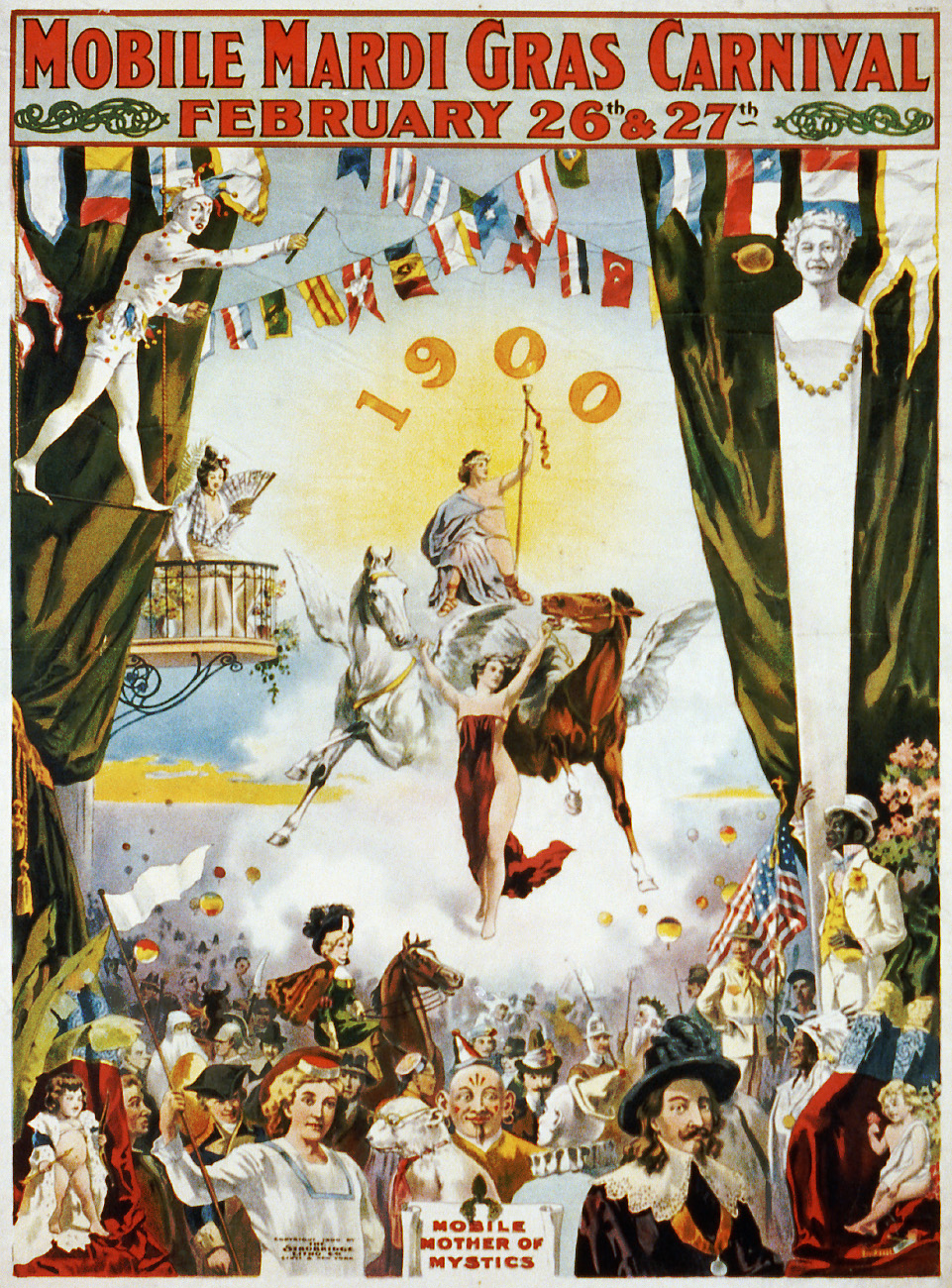
Mobile Carnival poster from 1900.

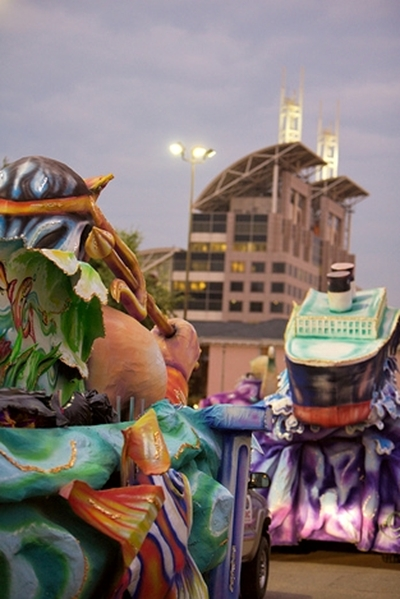
Floats lining up for an Order of Inca parade in 2007.

Mardi Gras is the annual Carnival celebration in Mobile, Alabama. It is the oldest official Carnival celebration in the United States, started by Frenchman Nicholas Langlois in 1703 when Mobile was the capital of Louisiana. Although today New Orleans and South Louisiana celebrations are much more widely known for all the current traditions such as masked balls, parades, floats and throws were first featured in Mobile. From Mobile being the first capital of French Louisiana (1702), the festival began as a French Catholic tradition. Mardi Gras has now evolved into a mainstream multi-week celebration across the spectrum of cultures, becoming school holidays for the final Monday and Tuesday (some include Wednesday), regardless of religious affiliation.

Although the area has traditions of exclusive societies, with formal masked balls and elegant costumes, the celebration has evolved over the past three centuries to become typified by public parades where members of societies, often masked, on floats or horseback, toss gifts (known as throws) to the general public. Throws include necklaces of plastic beads, doubloon coins, decorated plastic cups, candy, wrapped cakes known as Moonpies or snacks, stuffed animals, and small toys, footballs, frisbees, or whistles.

The masked balls or dances, where non-masked men wear white tie and tails (full dress or costume de rigueur) and the women wear full length evening gowns, are oriented to adults, with some mystic societies treating the balls as an extension of the debutante season of their exclusive social circles. Various nightclubs and local bars offer their own particular events.

Beyond the public parades, Mardi Gras involves many various mystic societies, some having begun in 1704, or ending with the Civil War, while new societies were formed every century. Some mystic societies are never seen in public parades, but rather hold invitation-only events for their secret members, with private balls beginning in November, each year.

== Overview ==
The Mobile Mardi Gras season starts in November, with exclusive parties held by some secret mystic societies, then New Year's Eve balls. It has become closely entwined with the social debutante season for certain families. Other mystic societies begin their events at Twelfth Night (January 6), with parades, balls (some of them masquerade balls), and king cake parties.

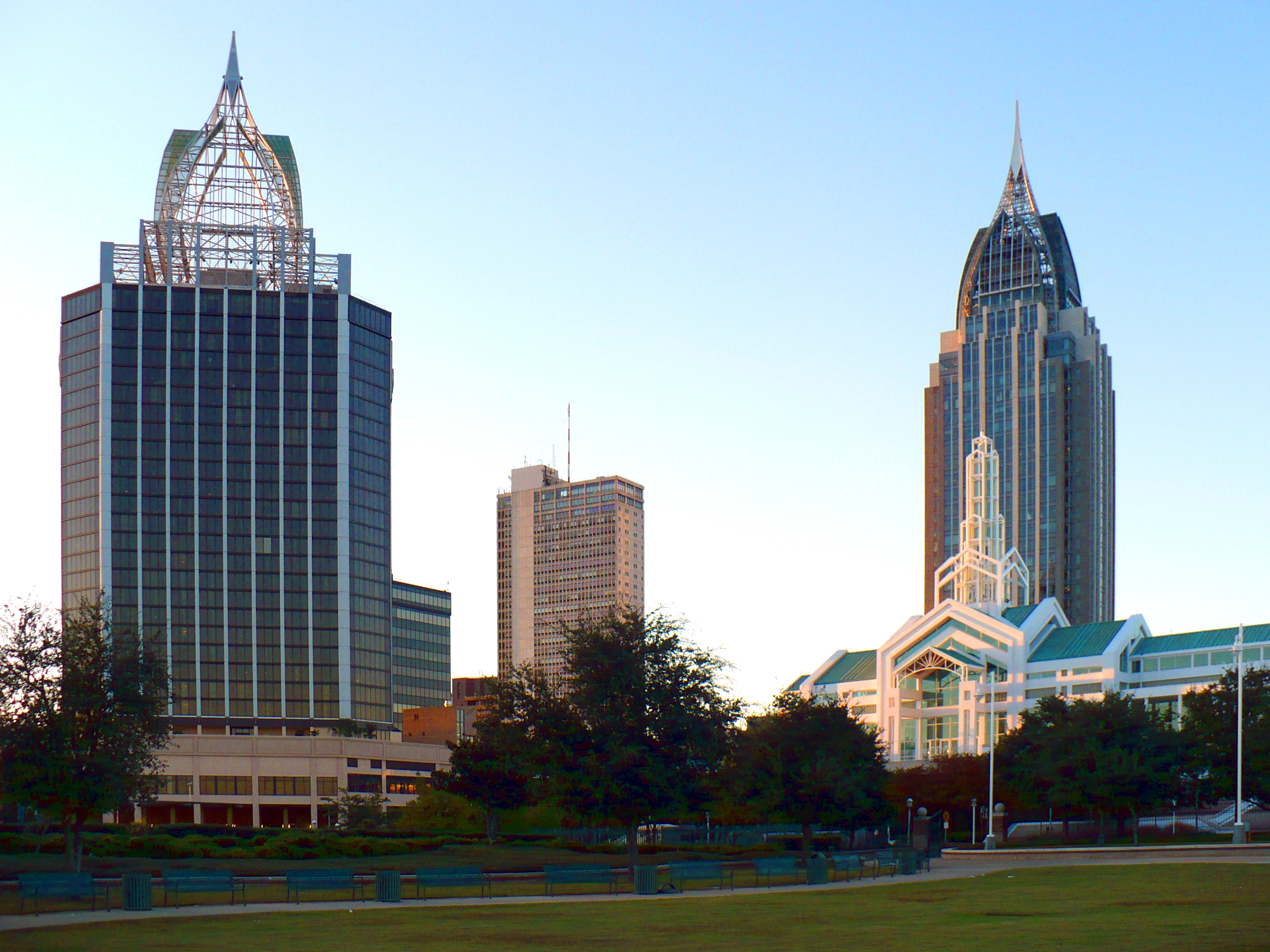
Mardi Gras in Mobile includes parades through the downtown streets of "The Port City".

During the last two weeks before Mardi Gras, at least one major parade takes place each day in the city. The largest and most elaborate parades take place the last few days of the season. In the final week of Mardi Gras, many events large and small occur throughout Mobile and the surrounding communities.

The parades in Mobile are organized mainly by mystic societies or orders. Society float riders toss throws to the crowds. The most common throws are strings of colorful plastic beads, doubloons (aluminium or wooden dollar-sized coins usually impressed with a krewe logo), wrapped candy/snacks/MoonPies, decorated plastic throw cups, stuffed animals, and other small inexpensive toys. Major krewes follow the same parade schedule and route each year.

To Mobilians, Mardi Gras refers to the entire festival season, also known as Carnival. Local schools have multiple "Mardi Gras Holidays", which often include Ash Wednesday. Mobile's culture is diverse, and as a result the Mardi Gras season has been extended. The area's traditions draw from all of its history, including French, Spanish, British, African, Creole, American, and even Swedish influences. The 2008 documentary The Order of Myths details the origins of Mobile Mardi Gras and highlights the differences in the mystic societies due to race and history.

== History ==
A type of Mardi Gras festival was brought to Mobile by the founding French Catholic settlers of French Louisiana, as the celebration of Mardi Gras was part of preparation for Ash Wednesday and the beginning of Lent. The first record of the holiday being marked in America is on March 3, 1699, at a camp site along the Mississippi River delta, though no celebration was held. Following the construction of Fort Louis de La Louisiane in 1702, the soldiers and settlers celebrated Mardi Gras beginning in 1703. Thus started an annual tradition, only occasionally canceled because of war.

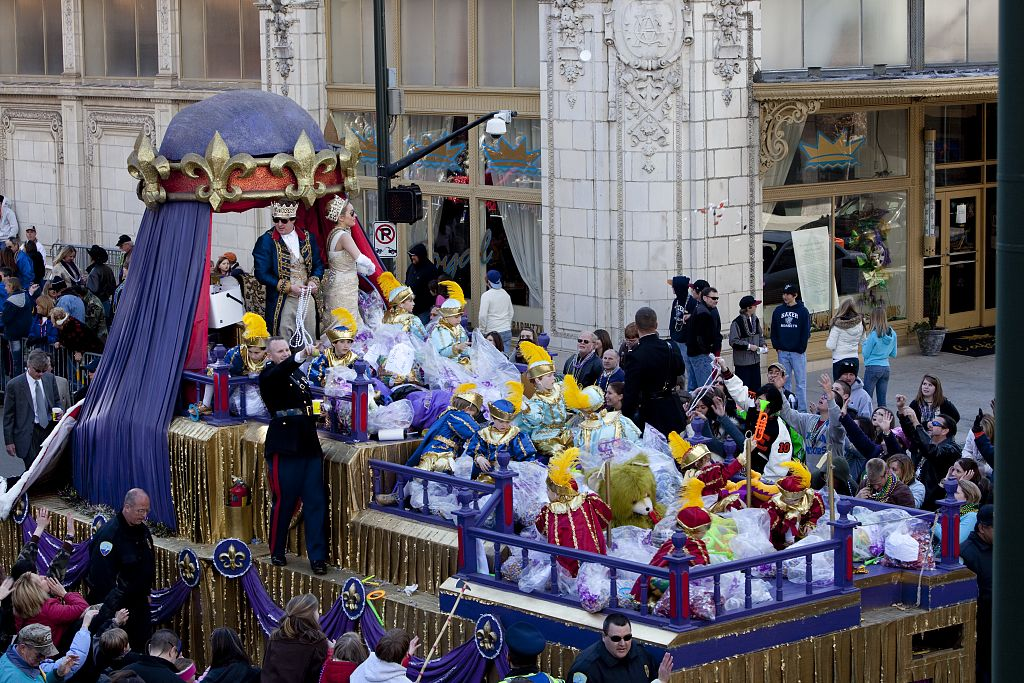
King Felix and his queen of Mardi Gras ride the crown float each year.

Mardi Gras has evolved over three centuries in the Mobile area, combining tradition and culture with new ideas. French Mardi Gras arrived in North America with the founding French settlers, the Le Moyne brothers, Pierre Le Moyne d'Iberville and Jean-Baptiste Le Moyne de Bienville. In the late 17th century, King Louis XIV sent the pair to defend France's claim on the territory of La Louisiane, which included what are now the U.S. states of Alabama, Mississippi, and Louisiana.

The two explorers, arriving first at Dauphin Island in what is now Alabama, navigated the mouth of the Mississippi River (charted by Cavelier de La Salle, 1682), sailed upstream, and on March 3, 1699, celebrated, naming the spot Pointe du Mardi Gras 60 miles downriver from the wilderness that would become New Orleans. Meanwhile, in 1702, the 21-year-old Bienville founded the settlement of Mobile (Alabama), as the first capital of French Louisiana, and in 1703, the American Mardi Gras tradition began with French annual celebrations in Mobile.

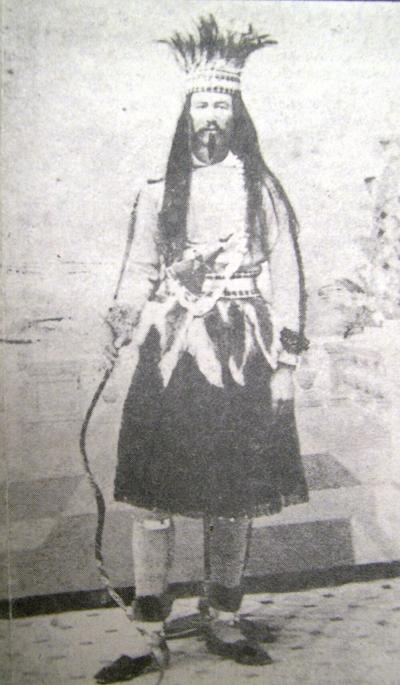
Joe Cain as Chief Slacabamorinico.

The feasting and revelry on Mardi Gras in Mobile was called Boeuf Gras (fatted ox). Masked balls, with the Masque de la Mobile, began in 1704. The first known parade was in 1711, when Mobile's Société du Bœuf Gras paraded on Mardi Gras, with 16 men pushing a cart carrying a large papier-mâché cow's head.

By 1720, Biloxi became the second capital of Louisiana, and also celebrated French customs. Due to fear of tides and hurricanes, in 1723, the capital was moved to New Orleans, founded in 1718. That city also later started a Mardi Gras celebration.

In 1763, Mobile came under British control. Its restrictions on free blacks and racial segregation caused many Creoles to leave Mobile and move west towards New Orleans. In 1780, Spain took control of the Mobile area in the aftermath of the American Revolution. The Carnival celebration incorporated the Spanish custom of torch-lit parades on Twelfth Night (January 6, also known as Epiphany.) In 1813, Mobile became a United States city, included in the Mississippi Territory. In 1817 it was part of the Alabama Territory. In the Anglican and Episcopal traditions, the day before Ash Wednesday was celebrated as Shrove Tuesday, marked by consumption of rich foods before the fasting practices of Lent.

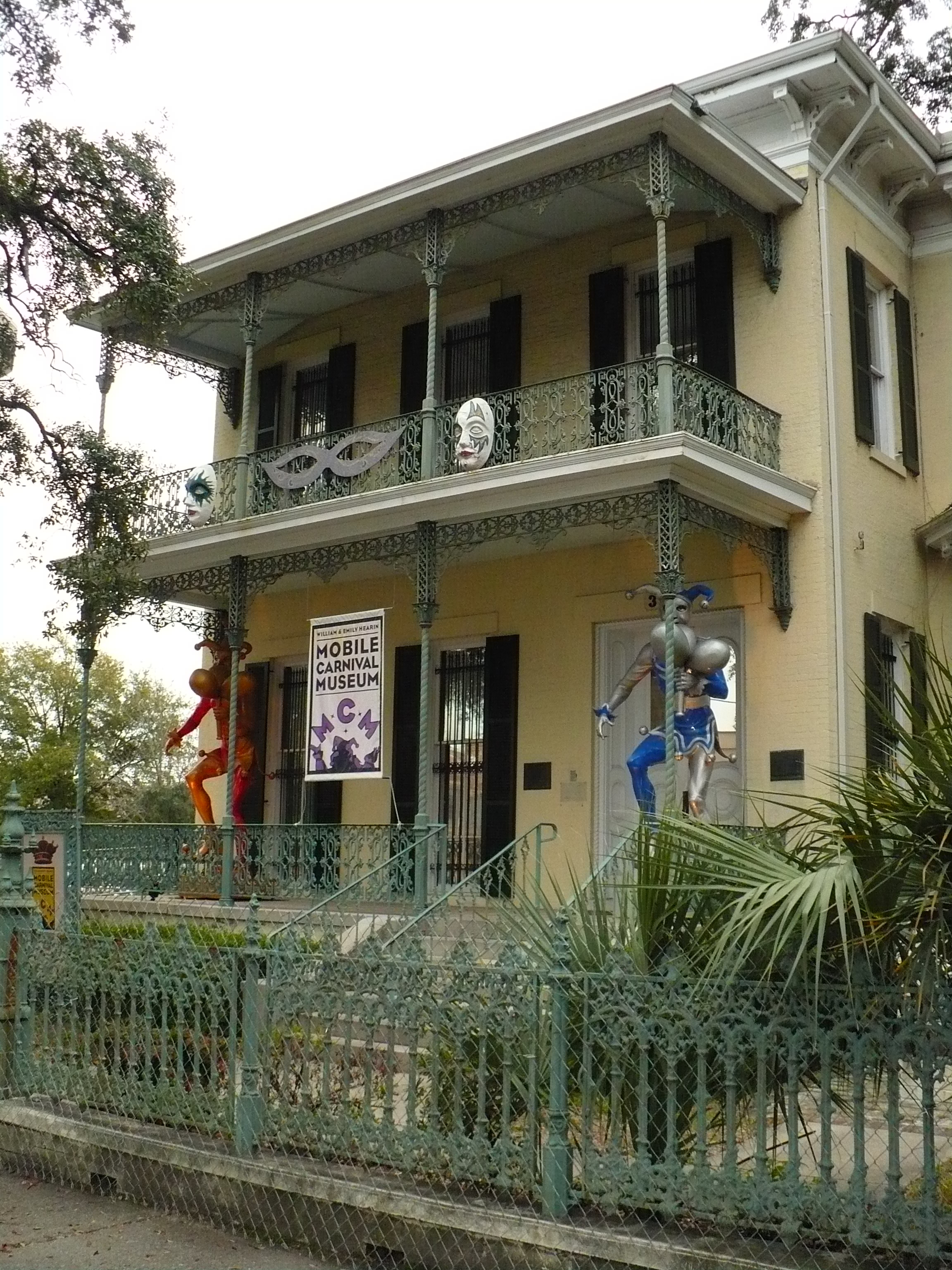
The Mobile Carnival Museum on Government Street.

In 1830, a group of revelers, led by Michael Krafft, who was likely influenced by his Pennsylvania Swedish traditions of celebrating the New Year, stayed awake all New Year's Eve, started a dawn parade on January 1, 1831, making noise with cowbells, hoes, and rakes. The group became the first parading mystic society, calling themselves the Cowbellion de Rakin Society, in a parody of French. They had annual parades each New Year's Eve. Nearly 125 years after Mobile's first parade of 1711, members of the Cowbellion de Rakin Society, took their parade tradition to New Orleans in 1835, eventually forming the Mistick Krewe of Comus.

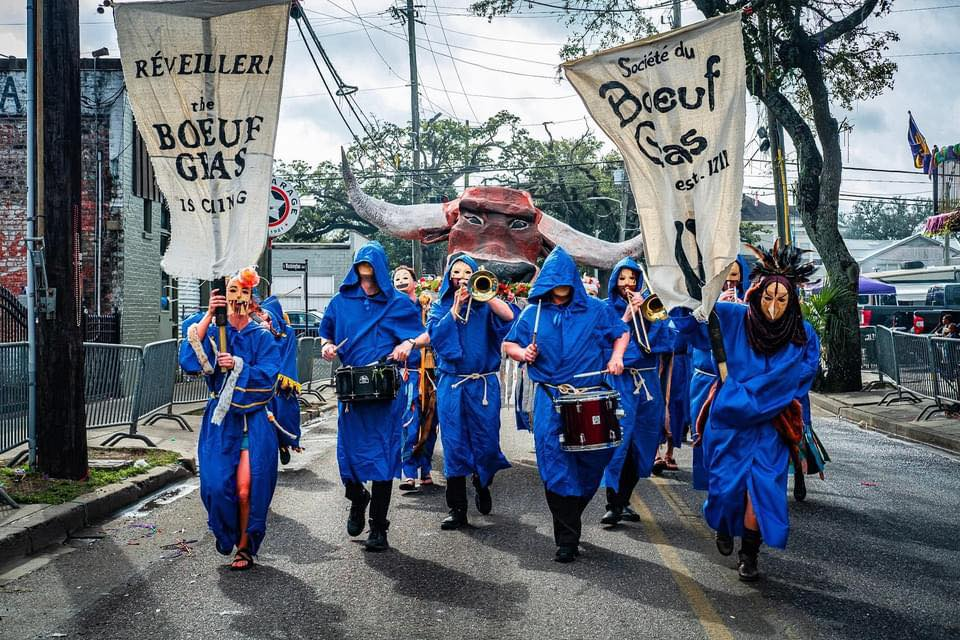
Société du Bœuf Gras in Mobile

In 1843, some men who had been refused membership by the Cowbellions, formed the Strikers Independent Society with their own New Year's parade. The Société du Bœuf Gras held their last procession for 161 years on Shrove Tuesday in 1861, before the start of the American Civil War, until the society and its procession was revived in 2022 .

In 1867, following the end of the Civil War, Joe Cain revived the parade tradition in Mobile on Mardi Gras, riding in a decorated charcoal wagon, along with six fellow veterans. That event has celebrated annually with Joe Cain Day since 1966. The Joe Cain Day parade is held on the Sunday before Mardi Gras. The event's founder, artist and historian Julian Lee "Judy" Rayford, portrayed the "Chief" and in 1970 handed the features to the third "Old Slac", fireman J. B. "Red" Foster. Foster portrayed the "Chief" until passing the features in 1985 to historian, public relations professional and pastor, Bennett Wayne Dean Sr. Dean, as Old Slac IV, celebrated his 36th year under the feathers on Joe Cain Day in 2021.

War, economic, political, and weather conditions sometimes led to cancellation of some or all major parades, especially during the Civil War and World War II. The city has traditionally always observed some celebration of Mardi Gras.

=== Traditional colors ===
Mardi Gras colors and meanings
Justice (purple)
Power (gold)

The traditional colors of Mardi Gras in Mobile are purple and gold. Purple has been related to royal monarchies in Europe, and is the liturgical color used during Lent in Christianity. Those who celebrate Mardi Gras elsewhere now incorporate a third color, green. This is perhaps an influence from New Orleans' traditional colors of purple, green, and gold, which came from the Russian House of Romanov in 1872. They were adopted there when Grand Duke Alexis Romanoff Alexandrovitch, brother of the heir apparent to the throne of Russia, accepted New Orleans's invitation to attend Mardi Gras, with festivities in his honor.

== Mystic societies ==
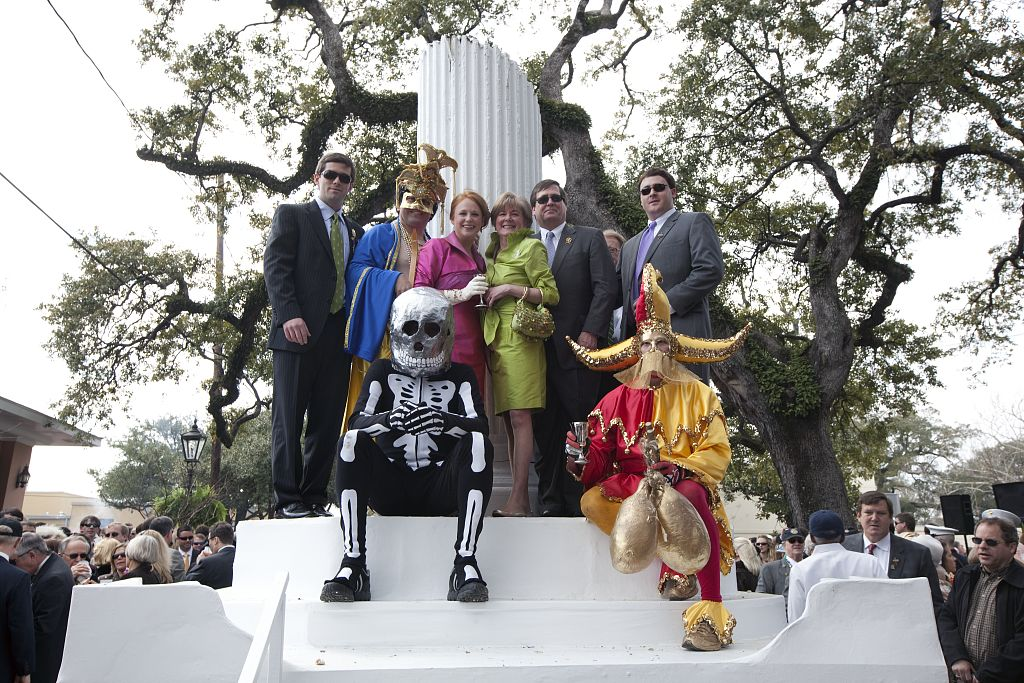
Order of Myths revelers, along with "Folly" and "Death", atop the traditional OOM broken pillar float.

The first mystic society began in Mobile in 1704, with the Societé de Saint Louise. It was founded by French soldiers at Fort Louis de La Louisiane. The annual Masque de la Mobile was started in the same year. In 1830, a group celebrating with an early morning parade, later known as the Cowbellion de Rakin Society held what became considered the first parade in Mobile society; in the early years for Christmas and New Year, unrelated to Mardi Gras.

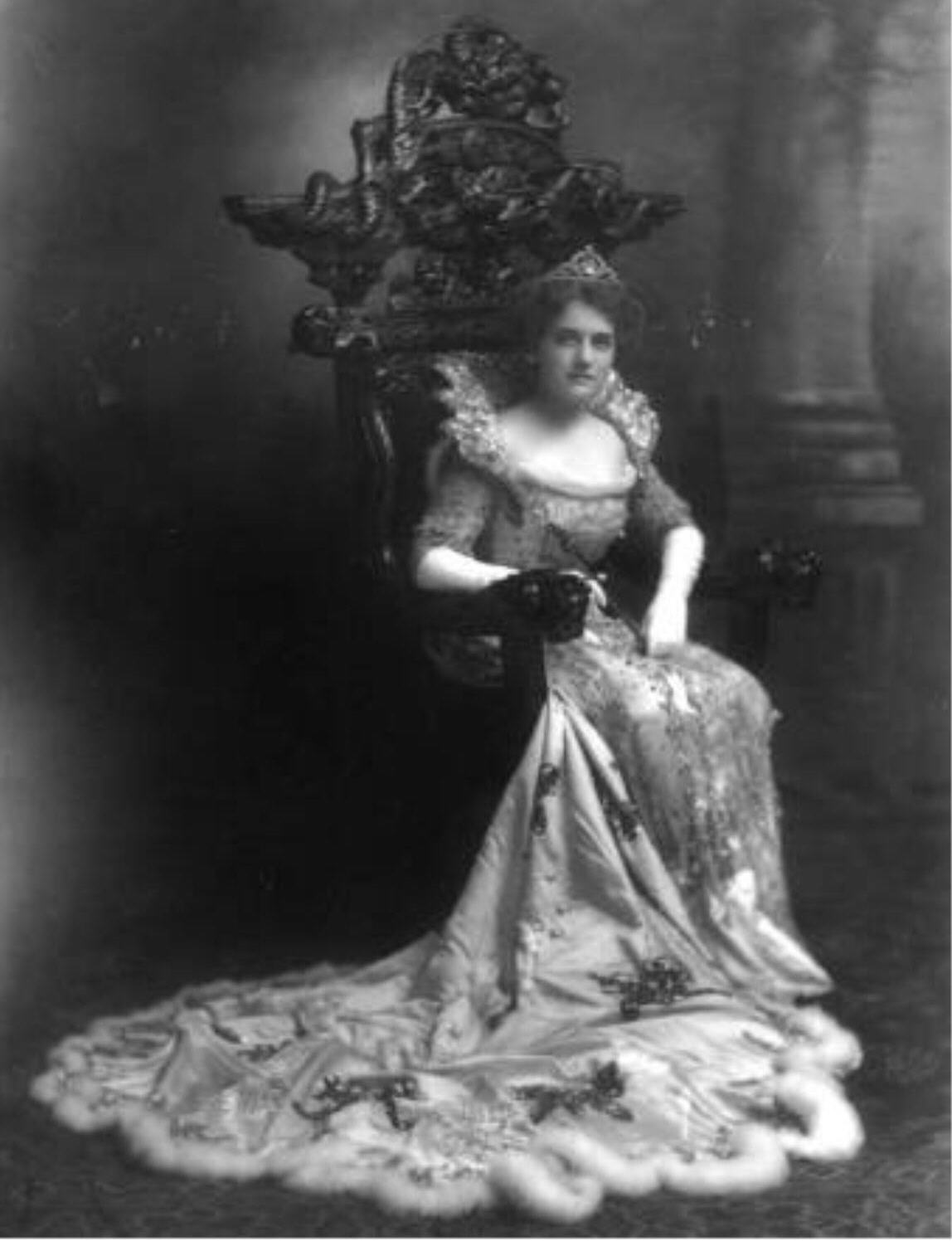
Amelia Lyons, 1909 Queen of Mobile Mardi Gras.

Dozens of mystic societies have come and gone over the past three centuries in Mobile. Membership has been formed by affiliated groups such as co-workers, bachelors, women, blacks, black women, Jews, married women, married couples, or open membership, including visitors. There are currently more than 40 mystic societies in Mobile. Because many are run as secret societies, their impact on Mobile politics, business affairs, and Carnival activities is difficult to determine, but they have been another avenue of social and political influence.

Today, many mystic societies operate under a business structure; membership is basically open to anyone who pays dues to have a place on a parade float. In contrast, the traditional mystic societies were social clubs with secret membership lists. Divulging one's membership in a society can be grounds for dismissal. Some of the newer mystic societies actively recruit prospective members. Some of the older societies have restricted membership, with waiting lists numbering in the hundreds; others restrict members to alumni of particular schools, or other conventions.

The oldest continuously parading society in Mobile is the Order of Myths (OOM), founded in 1867. Its emblem consists of "Folly" chasing "Death" around the broken pillar of life, a symbol of Mardi Gras in Mobile. Other notable mystic societies include the Knights of Revelry (with their emblem as "Folly" dancing on the rim of a huge champagne glass), the Comic Cowboys of Wragg Swamp, Infant Mystics, Mystics of Time, Crewe of Columbus, Mystic Stripers Society, Order of Inca and Conde Cavaliers. Ladies' societies include the Order of Polka Dots (OOP), the oldest and largest of the Mobile ladies' societies, Maids of Mirth (MOM), Order of LaShe's, Order of Athena, Neptune's Daughters and Mobile Area Mardi Gras Association (MAMGA).

== Contemporary Mardi Gras ==
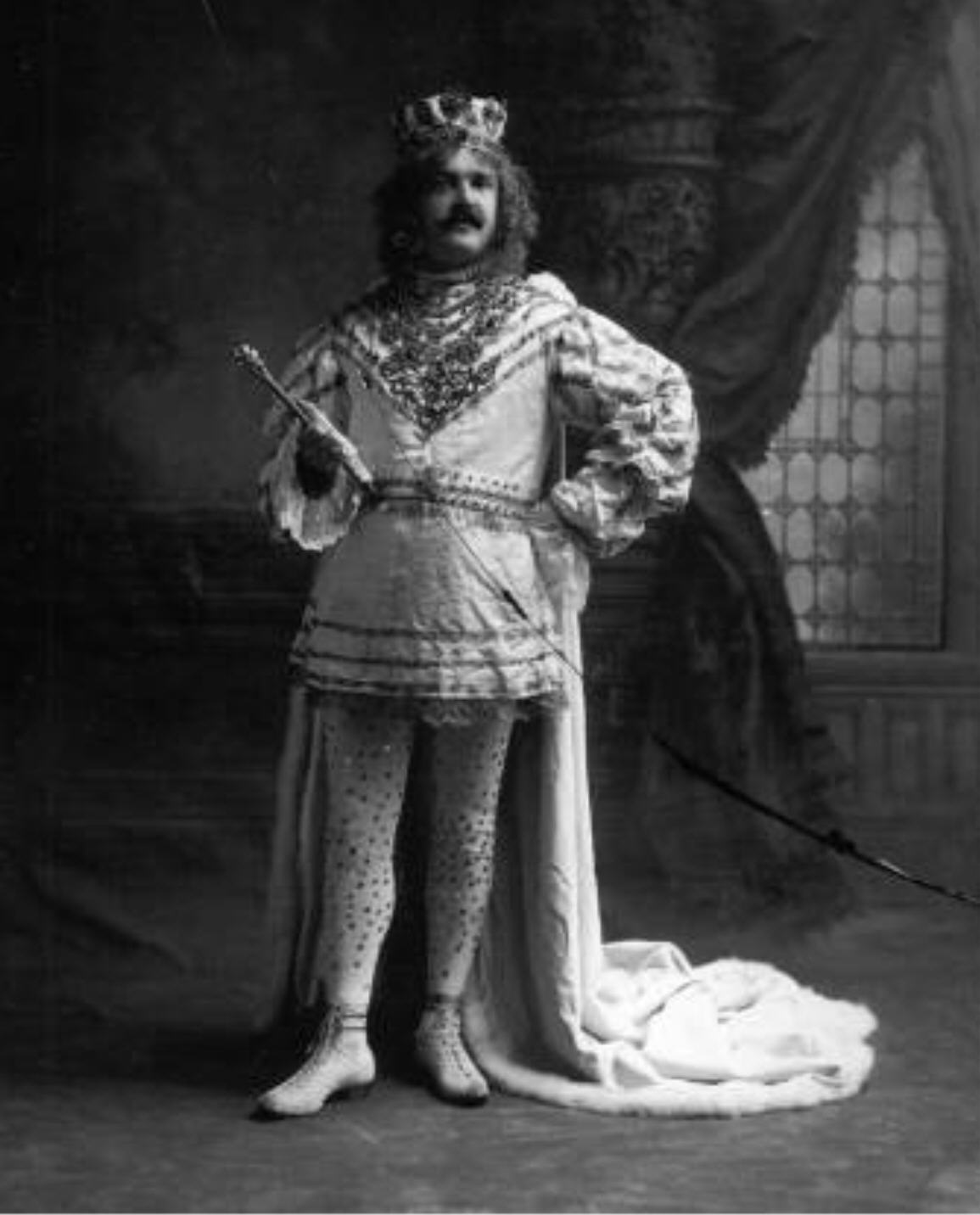
Orville Cawthon, King Felix of Mobile Mardi Gras in 1905.

Each year, the Mardi Gras (or Carnival) season starts with three major events: the November parties of the International Carnival Ball and the Camellia Ball where the city's debutantes are presented, New Year's Eve and January 6, also known as Twelfth Night or the Feast of the Epiphany. In Mobile, the parade season generally starts three weekends before Mardi Gras Day with the Conde Cavaliers parade.

=== Parades ===
Starting two Fridays before Mardi Gras, there is usually at least one parade every night. The Wednesday before Mardi Gras is reserved as a "rain out" day in case one or more of the earlier parades are affected by weather.

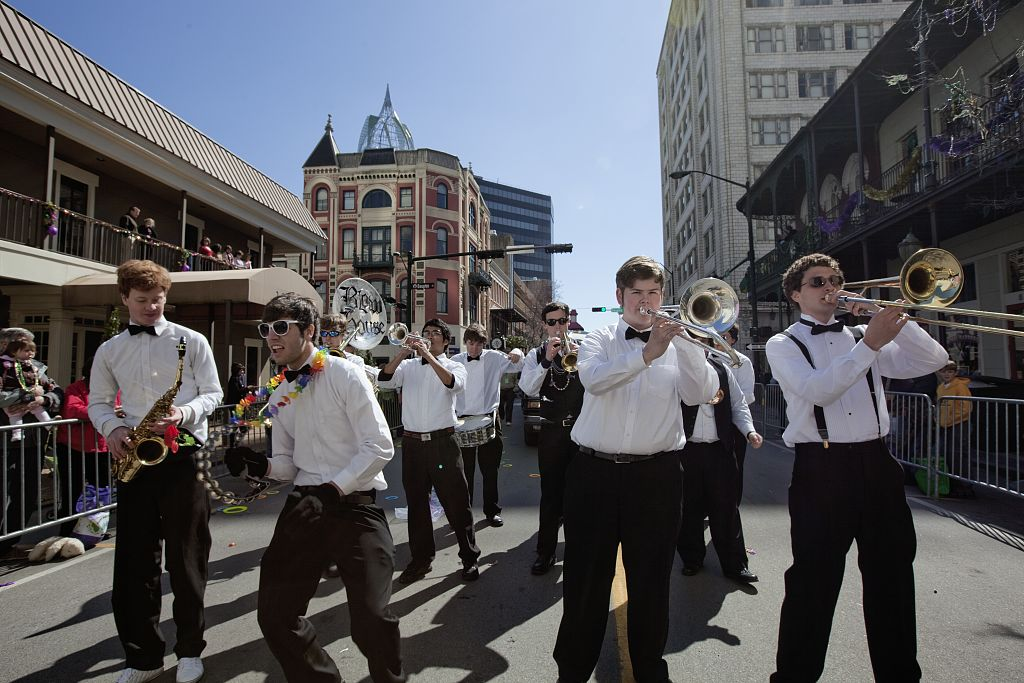
Blow House in the Order of Athena parade down Royal Street during the 2010 season.

Multiple parades lead up to Mardi Gras day. On the Sunday before Fat Tuesday, Joe Cain Day celebrations are held. In recent years these have included a jogger's run and the Joe Cain Procession, also known as the people's parade. Joining the Joe Cain Procession does not require membership in a mystic society. However, participants must now sign up with the city, due to unsafe numbers of people participating in past years. The parade is always led by Chief Slacabamorinico, currently personified by only the fourth person in the city's long-Carnival history to wear the features of the "Chief". He is surrounded by the Mistresses of Joe Cain clad in red veils and dresses, followed by Cain's Merry Widows wailing in black mourning attire.

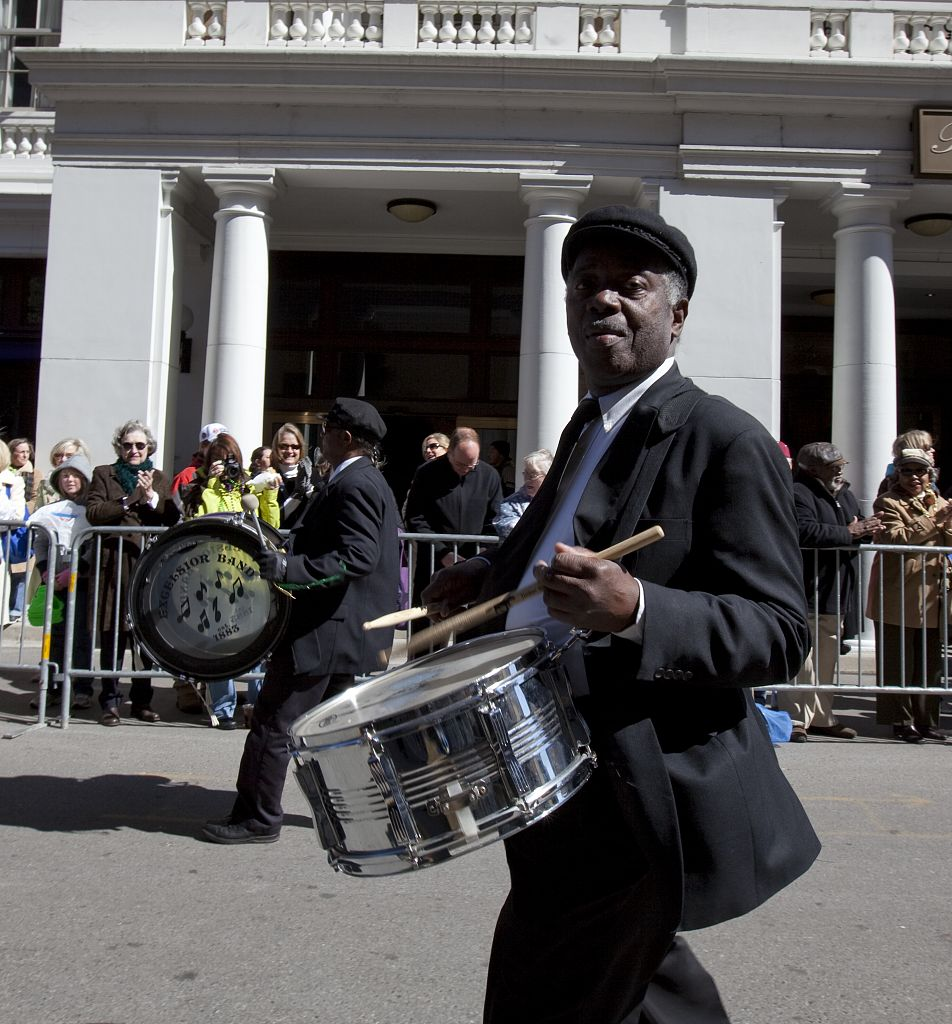
Members of the Excelsior Band (established 1883) marching down Royal Street. They are known for their Dixieland and conventional jazz.

The Monday before Ash Wednesday is known as "Lundi Gras" ("Fat Monday"), after the French tradition of eating good foods this day as well as Tuesday, in preparation for dietary restrictions during Lent. In Mobile, Lundi Gras is traditionally a family day. Schools are closed both Lundi and Mardi Gras. At noon, the Mobile Carnival Association's Floral Parade is held, with area parochial and public schools providing floats and young riders. The Optimist Club hosts a family-oriented midway near Fort Conde, complete with carnival rides, food, games and activities. Lundi Gras is also a day for king cake parties and other family get-togethers in Mobile. As a tradition, after other parades, the Infant Mystics society has held its parade annually after 6 p.m. on this Monday night in downtown Mobile.

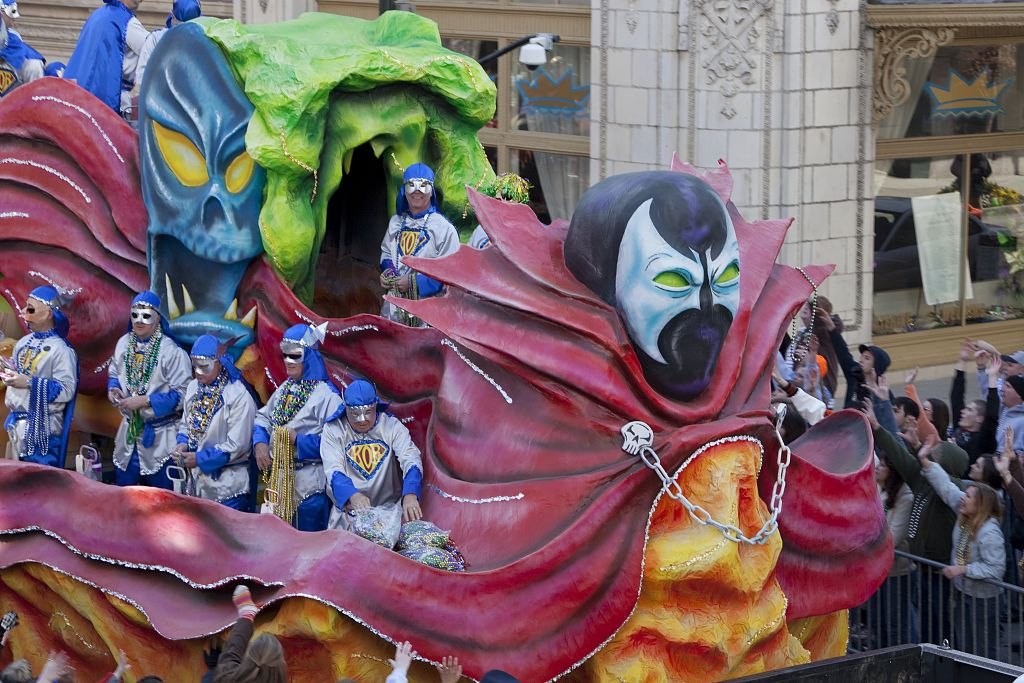
A Knights of Revelry parade float on Royal Street in 2010.

Celebrations begin early on Mardi Gras day. Downtown, the long parade organized by the Order of Athena rolls first, followed by the Comic Cowboys, founded in 1884. The evening ends with a spectacular night parade of illuminated floats decorated to a theme chosen by the Order of Myths. Each parade follows a defined route so that viewers can plan attendance along particular streets or balconies. dd Some parades are long and circular so that viewers can walk to a second viewing spot and catch more throws, as the floats circle back. It allows more time to see performances as well. Numerous smaller parades and walking clubs also parade around the city.

Promptly at the stroke of midnight at the end of Fat Tuesday, all festivities related to Mardi Gras cease, as it is the start of Lent. City crews quickly clean the streets of all signs of Mardi Gras for the next day. Local traditions frown on wearing Mardi Gras beads during Lent. Both Catholics and other Christians often observe Lenten rituals, such as giving up certain foods or taking on charitable obligations during the season of repentance.

==== Floats ====
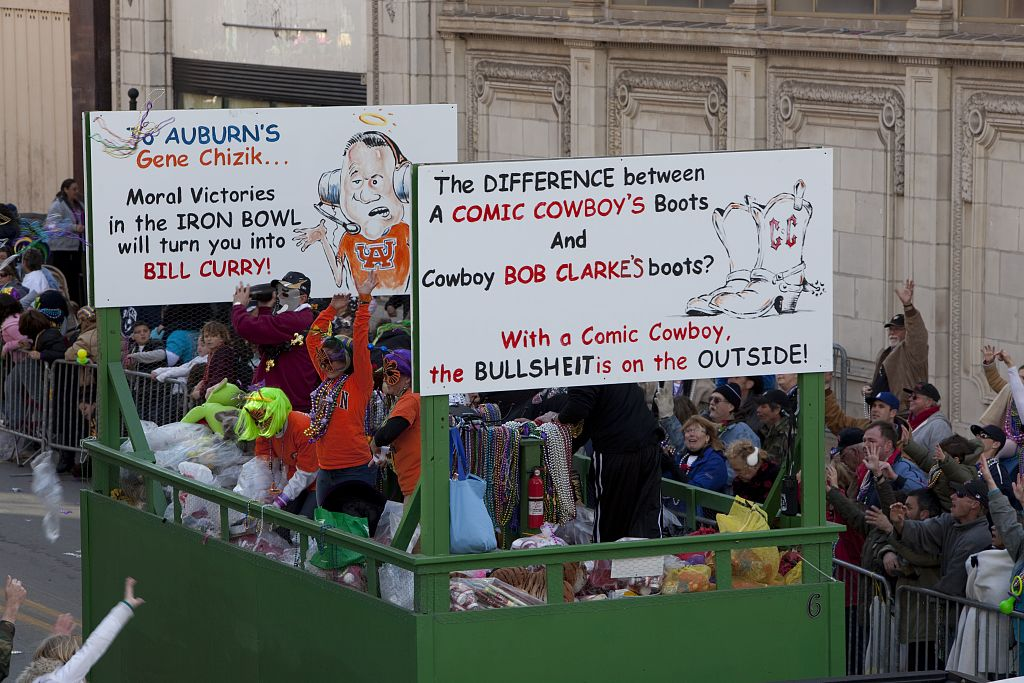
One of the Comic Cowboys of Wragg Swamps' satirical floats in 2010.

The design, construction and decoration of Mardi Gras floats is a year-round business in Mobile. Several companies along the Gulf Coast do no other work than building floats. The larger floats in Mobile's parades are designed to hold about 15 or 16 adults and their throws. City regulations stipulate length, width and height of floats, to ensure that the floats can safely navigate the narrow streets and tight turns of downtown.

The floats are typically multilevel, with a lower and upper level, and one or two mezzanine stations (typically near the back of the float). The float "captain" typically rides on the upper level, which lets him or her see everyone on the float. For floats in night-time parades, the structures are wired for lighting, and a portable generator is towed behind the float to provide power. Each float also contains some type of portable restroom facilities. Although from the street, a Mardi Gras float might look like a dainty, flimsy contraption, the reality is that they are quite sturdily built and are capable of withstanding a good rocking by the riders.

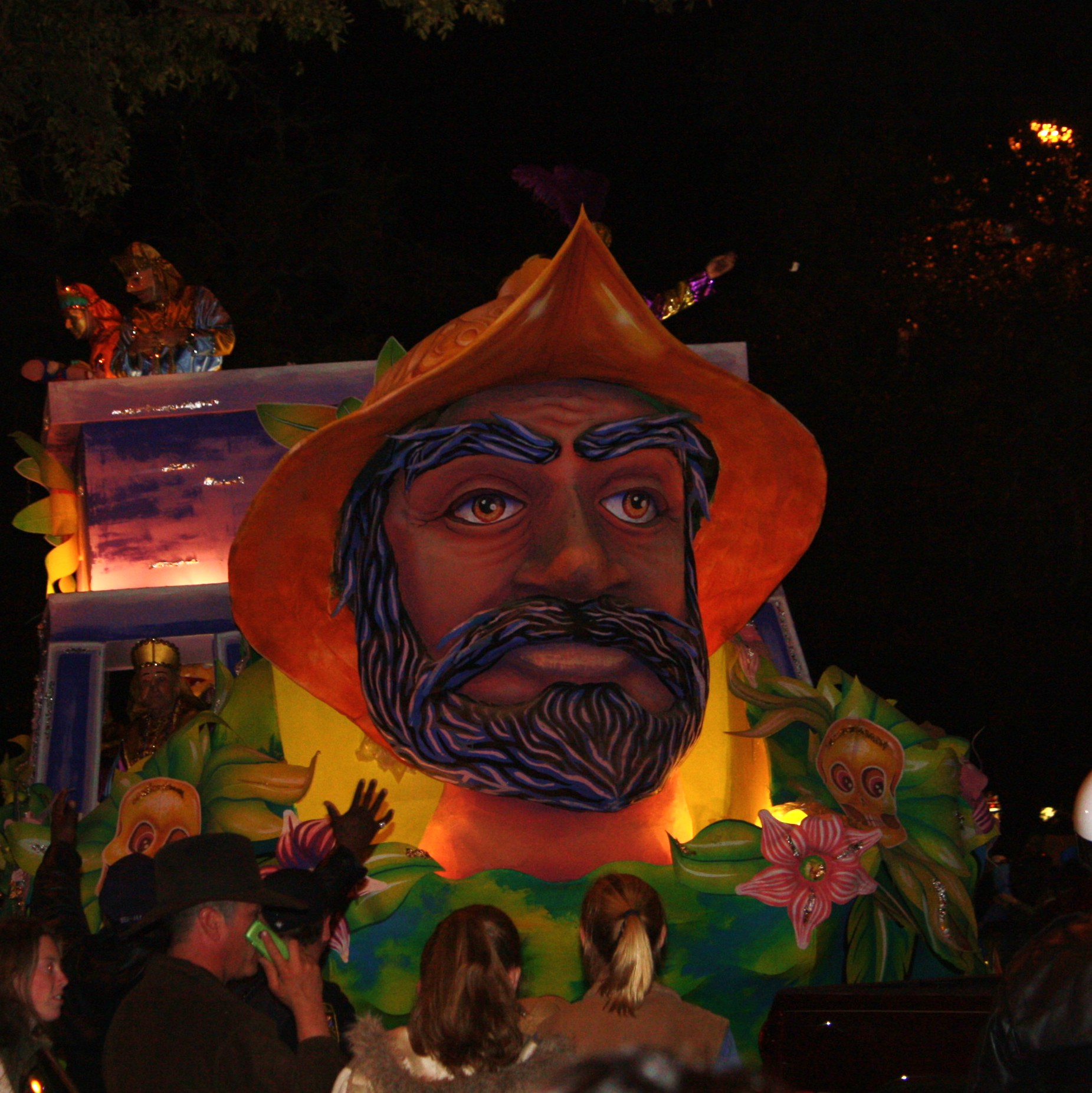
Order of Incas conquistador float in 2009.

Some of Mobile's most famous floats include:

- Order of Myths Emblem: Folly chasing Death around the broken pillar of life.
- Knights of Revelry Emblem: Folly dancing in the goblet of life.
- Infant Mystics Emblem: A black cat atop a cotton bale, the foundation of Mobile's antebellum wealth
- Mystics of Time's Vernadean: A giant, rolling, fire and smoke-breathing dragon float
- Mystic Stripers Society: Two large 40-foot-long (12 m) emblem floats, one a ferocious and "strong" Tiger, another a sleek and "fast" Zebra.
- Crewe of Columbus' Nina, Pinta and Santa Maria: Three floats built to resemble Columbus' famed ships.
- Order of Polka Dots: Famed emblem featuring three winged sons of Pegasus bearing the Golden Chariot of the Gypsy Queen through rainbow enveloped clouds
- Order of Inca Messengers and Sun Worshippers: Some of Mobile's largest moving structures.
- Conde Cavaliers Emblem: Swashbuckler points his sword right at Mobile.
- Comic Cowboys: Series of satirical comments on current events, locally and nationally.
- Mobile Area Mardi Gras Association (MAMGA) The Mollies

==== Throws ====
For many of the Mardi Gras parades in Mobile, members of societies on floats toss gifts to the general public, known as throws, that include plastic beads, moonpies, doubloon coins, decorated plastic cups, candy, wrapped cakes/snacks, stuffed animals, and small toys, footballs, frisbees, or whistles.

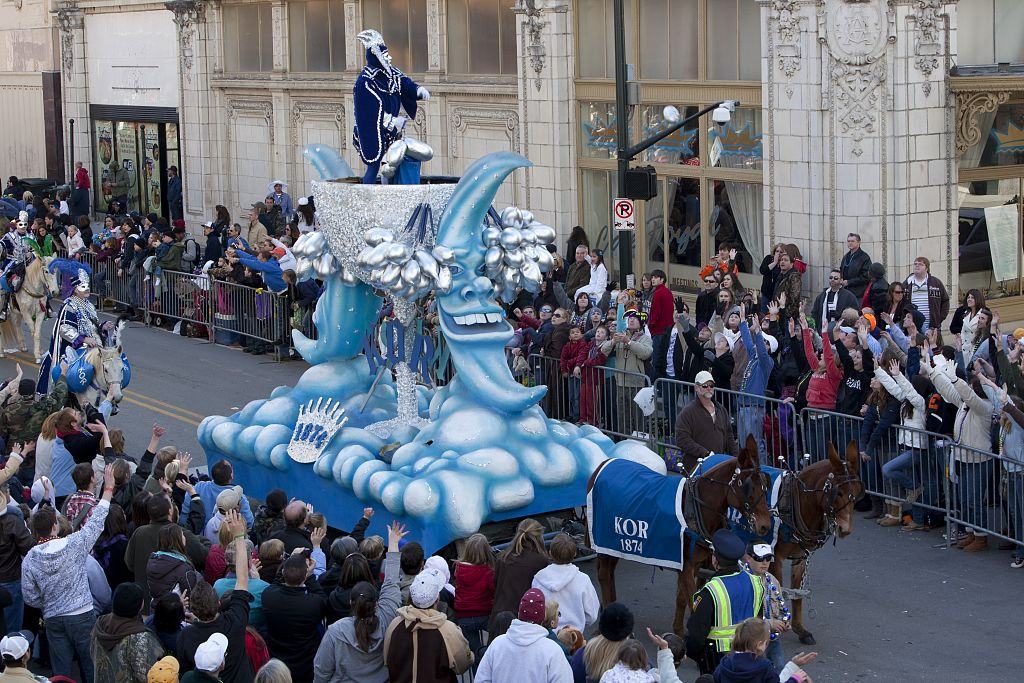
Knights of Revelry members tossing throws from atop a float in 2010.

Mardi Gras throws have themselves evolved over the years. As little as 20 years ago, the beads thrown by Mobile maskers were small, cheap plastic pieces, and few maskers gave much thought to them. Today, the beads can be the most expensive items on a masker's throw list. In 1956, the first Moon Pies were thrown by children on the Queen's float in the Comic Cowboys parade. Moon Pies have since become a staple of Mardi Gras in Mobile. Other items that have come and gone through Mobile's Mardi Gras history include Cracker Jacks (outlawed in 1972), confetti and candy. Maskers throwing candy today typically throw small bags of bubble gum, kisses and other sweet treats.

Mystic society members have thrown strings of beads from floats to parade-goers since at least the late 19th century. Until the 1960s, the most common forms were custom-colored necklaces of smaller glass beads made in Czechoslovakia. These were replaced by inexpensive, durable, standardized plastic beads. Lower-cost beads allow riders to purchase greater quantities, hence throws have become more numerous and common.

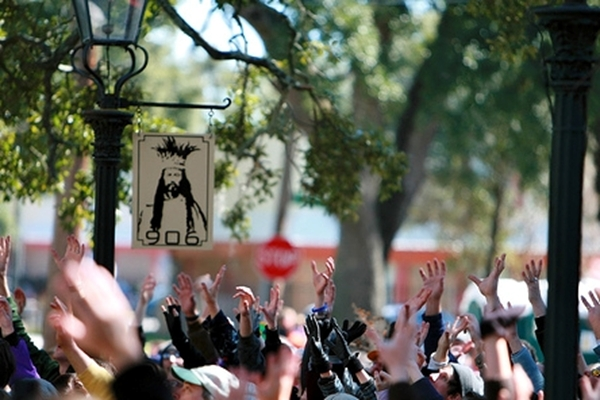
Revelers outside of Joe Cain's former home on Augusta Street, with their hands outstretched. They are begging for throws from the Cain's Merry Widows.

In the 1990s, many people lost interest in small, common beads, often leaving them where they had landed on the ground. Larger, more elaborate, multi-colored bead necklaces and strands with figures of animals, people, or other objects have become the sought-after throws. Nevertheless, citing the increasing cost of throws, maskers continue to buy and throw the smaller diameter beads to the masses and save the more expensive, elaborate creations for friends along the route.

One of the many Mardi Gras throws, doubloons are large coins, either plastic or metal, that are usually in the Mardi Gras colors. These coins portray the mystic society's emblem, name, and founding date on one side, and the theme and year of the parade and ball on the other side. The Infant Mystics were the first Mobile mystic to toss doubloons in the mid-1960s.

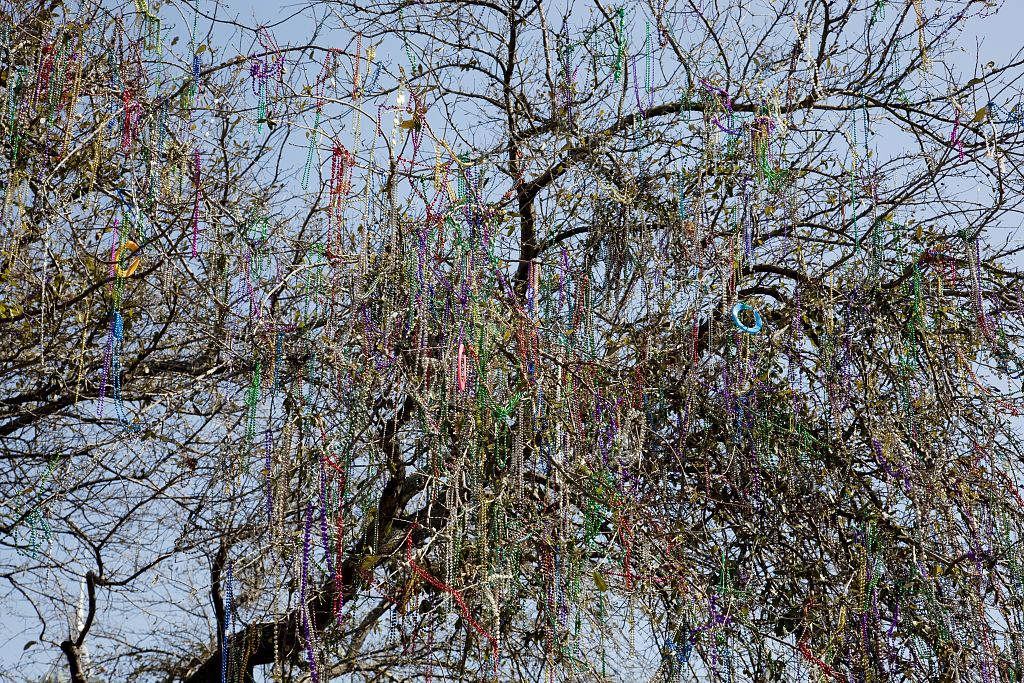
A tree on Government Street, chock full of stray Mardi Gras beaded necklaces in 2010.

The doubloons thrown during the parade are inexpensive, stamped anodized aluminum. However, a thriving cottage industry has developed for the production and collection of limited edition doubloons. As a means of fundraising, many societies now offer limited edition doubloons struck from bronze, silver, gold and platinum. Other offerings include cloisonné and hand-painted varieties. Rather than being stamped, these pieces are struck like legal tender coins. The Resurrected Cowbellion de Rakin Society struck what has become the most unusual coins in Mobile Carnival history – the Belldallion – doubloons struck in the shape of a cowbell.

In recent years, plastic cups have been thrown. The Order of Inca was the first krewe to throw plastic cups emblazoned with their emblem and the theme of the parade and ball. Now, every mystic society in the city throws themed cups from their floats. Also thrown are generic Mardi Gras cups, often with the dates of future Mardi Gras seasons printed on them.

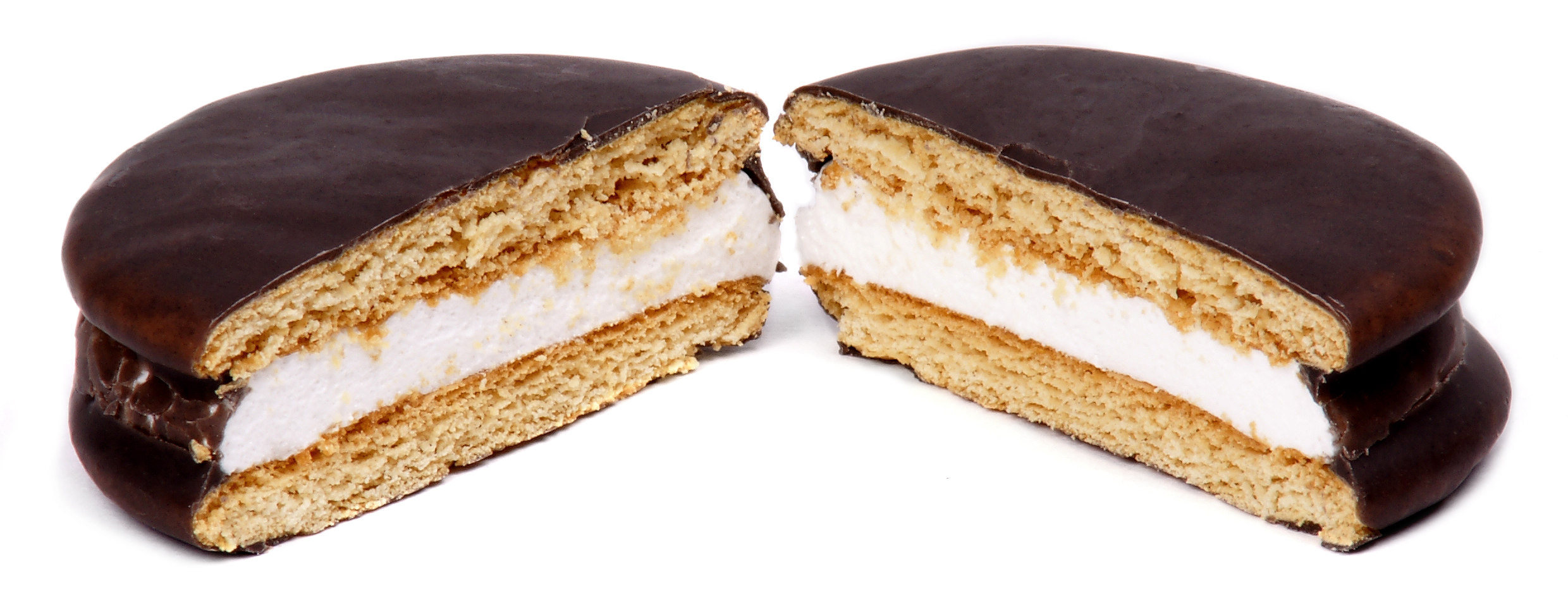
A chocolate Moon Pie.

The snacks are typically wrapped, individual portions of food, such as a brownie cookie, snack cake, bag of peanuts, or a Moon Pie, usually in the flavors of chocolate, banana, or orange frosted marshmallow cake. Several newer flavors of coconut, vanilla, mint, peanut butter, blueberry, and salted caramel have been added over the years. The tossed snacks have also included various bags of pork rinds crackers. Other snacks include dried fruits and whole bags of candy and gum.

A large variety of soft plastic toys have become throws, such as hollow plastic water pistols, or ribbed tube-straw whistles. The plastic toy Frisbees are typically small-sized frisbees, with the round disc less than 8 inches (41 cm) in diameter. Small footballs of soft plastic, or foam rubber, have been thrown from floats, often aimed to spin when thrown like a full-sized football. Many of these are emblazoned with the Society's emblem or initials.

==== Costumes and masks ====
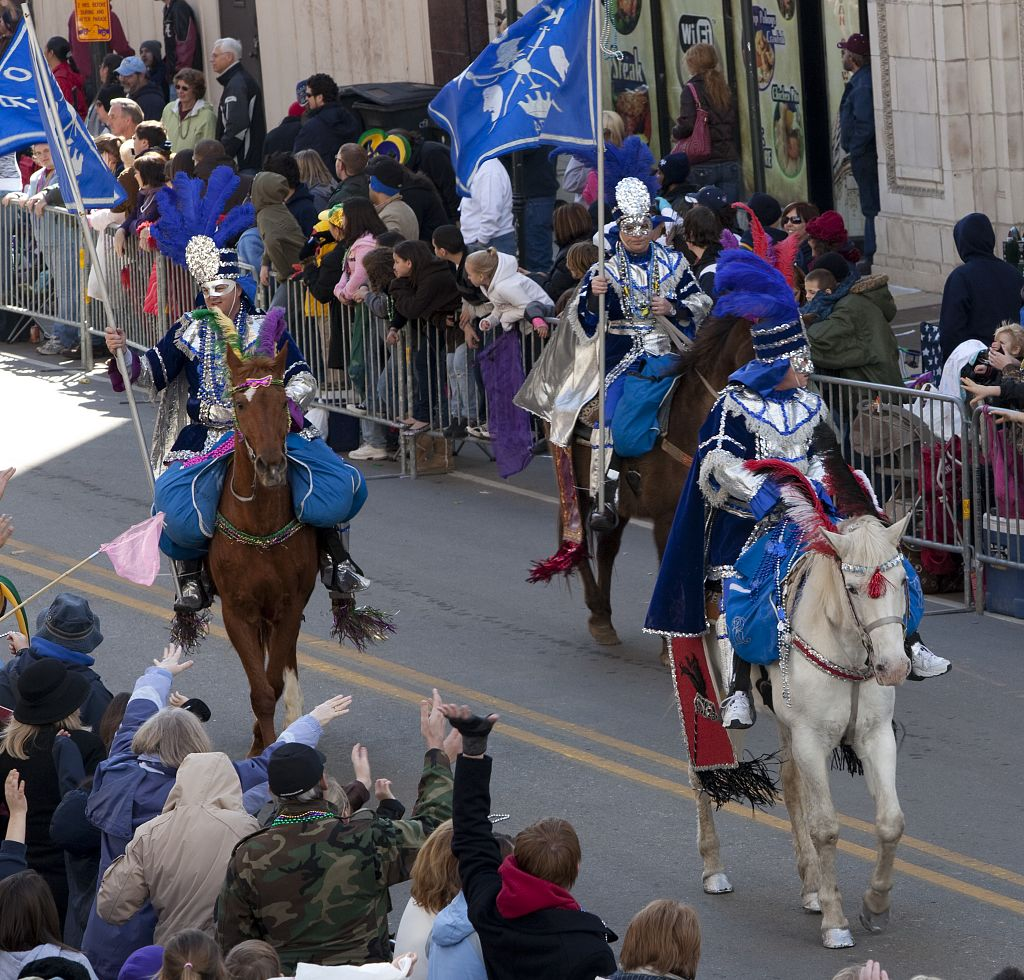
Costumed and masked mystic society members during a parade.

On the days before Fat Tuesday (other than at parties), people who do not belong to a mystic society seldom wear costumes and masks publicly. Sometimes the general public may wear costumes or masks on Mardi Gras Day. Most people simply dress to be attractive, enjoying the open air and the chance to socialize with other people.

Mystic society members wear elaborate costumes that reflect the theme of their parade, ball or float. Costumes include custom-made hats or feather headdresses, though some societies do not require this. Most of the traditional krewes require riders to wear a mask that is sufficient to conceal the rider's identity. Excessive cutting of the mask or removing the mask at any time during the parade is grounds for dismissal from some societies. Some mystic societies also require that members wear masks during the society's ball (typically held the same night of its parade).

Since 1957, the general public has been allowed to wear masks only on Mardi Gras day from 9am – 9pm, or if they are members of mystic societies. The restriction is related to problems with masked bandits and also lingering associations with the damage done by the Ku Klux Klan.

==== Flambeaux carriers ====
The flambeaux or flame-torch was originally a beacon for parade-goers to better enjoy the spectacle of night festivities. In Mobile, night parades were formerly cross-lit by torches topped by signal flares.

By the end of the 20th century, most burning flares were replaced by generator-powered electric lights on the floats. The Order of Myths parade still uses people carrying flambeaux, a.k.a. fuel torches, on Mardi Gras night.

==== Commercialization ====
There is virtually no commercial advertising during the Mobile parades, as it was prohibited by law in 1935. The various floats in a parade have been designed as independent creations, although some mystic societies have entertained the idea of corporate sponsors. Societies, however allow companies to enter their vehicles and floats into most parades, and local car dealers often use their vehicles to pull the floats, and sell them at a discount after the vehicles have been used.

==== Media Coverage ====
Most TV stations in Mobile provide coverage on Fat Tuesday, including WKRG and WALA who set up on the main parade route and cover the parades during the morning and afternoon. When WALA was located on Government Street in downtown Mobile, their station was on the parade route and station staff could easily cover a parade by setting up on their rooftop.

From 2015 to 2023, WJTC UTV44 covered many of the other parades throughout the season starting with the Order of Polka Dots and ending with the Order of Myths on Fat Tuesday. Sister station WPMI NBC 15 also covered Fat Tuesday parades from 10am-2pm until 2023. They had set up on the balcony that was constructed on the former WALA-TV studios, which is now owned by Hargrove Engineers for their Controls and Automation division.

== Other traditions ==
=== King cake ===
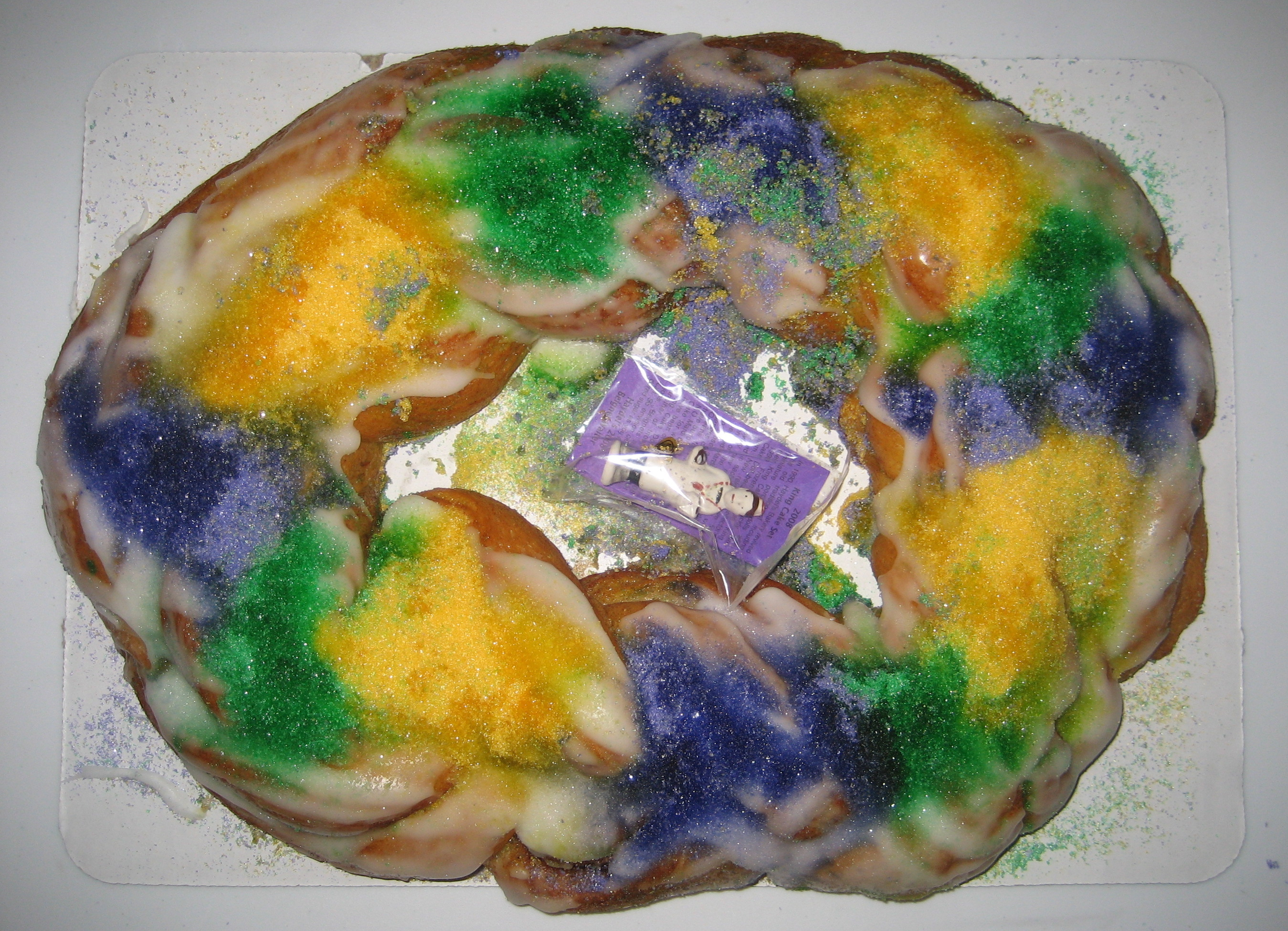
A traditional Mardi Gras king cake.

The first week of January starts the king cake season. The traditional king cake was associated with Epiphany, January 6, also known as Twelfth Night, when English and Europeans celebrated Christmas for twelve days up to this night. The current version is a coffee cake, and is oblong and braided. The cake is iced with a simple icing and covered with purple, green and gold sugar. Each cake contains a small hidden baby doll. According to custom, whoever finds the doll must either buy the next King Cake or throw the next King Cake party. In Mobile, people throw hundreds of King Cake parties every year, and thousands of cakes are made, bought and eaten.

== Mardi Gras icons ==
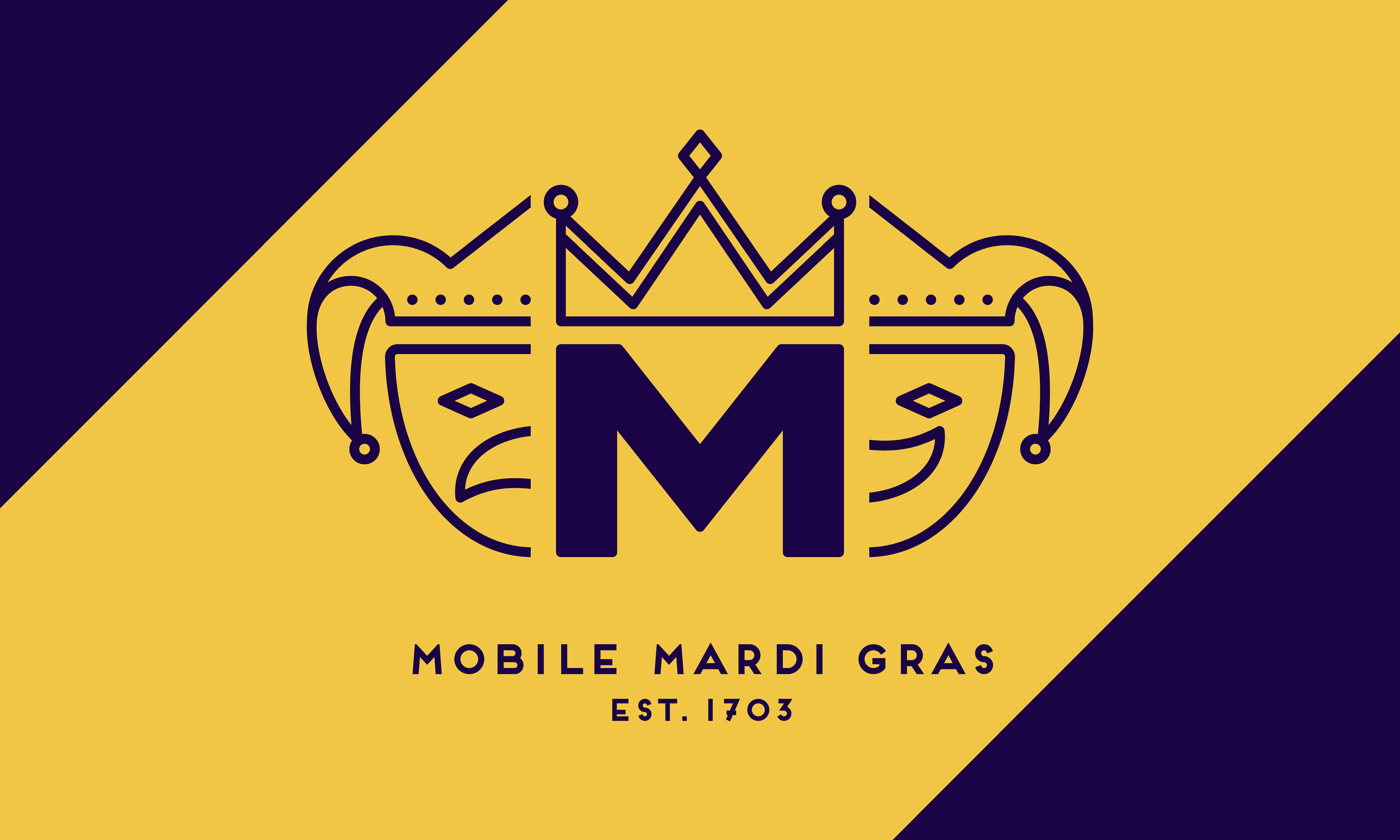
Mardi Gras flag of Mobile

Several common images or phrases appear during the Mardi Gras season:

- official Mardi Gras flags: flags with a special emblem in Mardi Gras colors
- signs or items using traditional colors: purple, green, and gold
- the faces of Comedy and Tragedy: the smiling and frowning theater faces
- feathered masks: with fluffy feathers attached at the edges
- Fleur de Lis: the French symbol from the time Mobile was the capital of the French colony
- "Let the good times roll!" (French: "Laissez les bons temps rouler")
- "Throw me something, Mister!"

== Legal restrictions ==
Over the past centuries, laws have been established in Mobile to limit certain types of behavior during the Carnival season. Laws in Mobile have regulated activities based on race, immorality, noise, face masks, gloves, parading, fireworks, and objects thrown. In 1826, people of color were required to obtain licenses for assemblies or dances; in 1845, balls were banned at homes of free blacks or slaves (but not Creoles); and in 1866, laws restricted noise or any party where "immoral or disorderly persons" might gather.

- 1826: According to Section 7 of City of Mobile Ordinance 4 titled "An Ordinance to establish a City Watch and to regulate the duties of Watchmen," no ball, dance, or assembly of people of color would be permitted within the City unless they first obtain a license from the Mayor or the Alderman, with no license granted passed 1 a.m.
- 1845: A Mobile city Ordinance prohibits free blacks or slaves from holding balls at their place of residence; the restriction does not include the Creoles in Mobile, who held a distinct status in American society as written in the 1803 Treaty of Paris (Louisiana Purchase), with Thomas Jefferson; Alabama had become a state in 1819, giving American protection to citizens after Mobile had been a colony of Spain, 1780–1812.

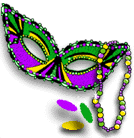
Mardi Gras mask and beads.

After 1902 the use of masks were largely limited to mystic societies or children under 12. In 1918, public masking was forbidden in Mobile during World War I (repealed in 1920); by 1947, masks were limited to mystic societies only, plus a masked individual was forbidden to "wear gloves or have his hands concealed" or covered. After 1957, the general public were allowed to wear masks, but only on Mardi Gras day from 9a.m.–9p.m., or as members of mystic societies.

Because of safety issues, in 1987 fireworks were prohibited during Mardi Gras. The city also restricted pets in parade areas, skateboards and scooters, prohibited firearms, and the public throwing any object into the parade.

While many visiting tourists might think of Mardi Gras as an adult holiday, local residents view it as a time of family traditions; indeed, many view the parades mainly as sources of enjoyment for children. Many families with young children gather along the parade routes in downtown. The city discourages nudity, blatant public drunkenness and other lewd behavior, which will lead to a prompt arrest if witnessed by law enforcement.

== Comparison with New Orleans ==
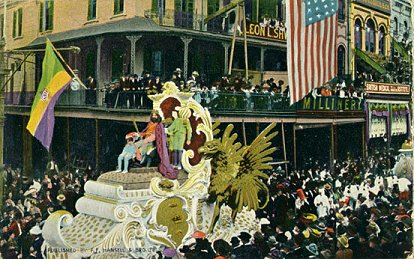
Rex procession on Canal Street in New Orleans in 1904.

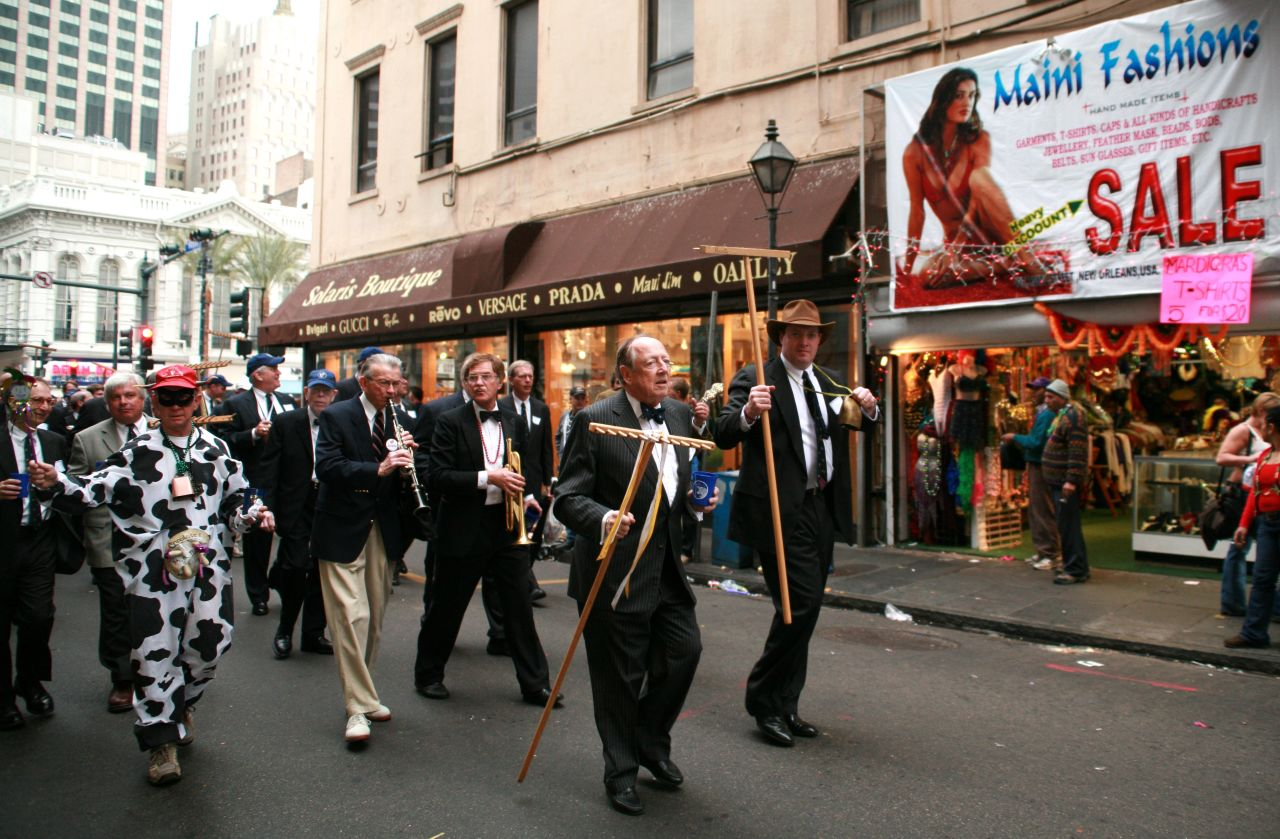
New Orlean's Cowbellion de Rakin Society parading with rakes and cowbells down Canal Street in 2007.

Due to the complex web of events in the 300-year history of Mardi Gras in Mobile, it is not easy to compare activities with New Orleans, which includes celebrations of the many communities within the Greater New Orleans area. Both regions schedule dozens of parades and have masked balls oriented towards adults, with alcoholic beverages. Both celebrations include family-oriented activities in addition to the more popularized images of alcohol consumption and rowdiness that have colored popular perception of the events.

The histories of Mobile and New Orleans are broadly interconnected, with both having been the capital of French Louisiana in the early 18th century, and later, both under control of Spain. Although Mobile's annual parades began with a Tuesday procession in 1711, the scheduled mystic society parades in Mobile were developed 120 years later and held for New Year's Eve, while New Orleans developed a traditional Tuesday public procession on Mardi Gras day. A cross-mix occurred when former Mobile Cowbellions instigated scheduled Tuesday parades in New Orleans, which led Joe Cain having parading in New Orleans in 1865, and then in Mobile in 1867. The influence of Joe Cain led to an annual Joe Cain Day in Mobile, celebrated with a parade, on the Sunday before Ash Wednesday, but not in New Orleans, which has other traditions.

The mystic societies or orders/krewes differ between the cities. Mobile's final parade, on Tuesday night, is presented by the Order of Myths. In New Orleans, since 1857 the final parade had been presented by the Mistick Krewe of Comus, until they ceased parading in 1991. Now Mardi Gras ends with the parades of Zulu, Rex, Elks and Crescent City. The official end of Mardi Gras in New Orleans is the meeting of the courts of Rex and Comus at midnight. Both krewes have held their balls on Fat Tuesday night for over a century. Rex and his queen and court leave their ball and go to ball of the Mystic Krewe of Comus, as Rex is the younger organization.

== Post Hurricane Katrina ==
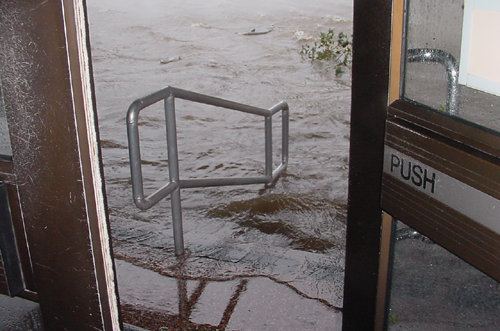
Flooding at the federal courthouse on Saint Joseph Street during Hurricane Katrina.

Like so much of the Gulf Coast, many parts of Mobile were flooded due to the intense storm surge caused by Hurricane Katrina on August 28–29, 2005. Although some waterfront areas were submerged and battered by high waves, downtown was flooded only several feet deep, including the downtown parade routes. Despite these difficulties, enough of the routes were cleared to continue Mardi Gras celebrations, and Mobile had the largest Mardi Gras in its history following the storm. The following year, the 2007 Mardi Gras season in Mobile was attended by roughly 900,000 people, with police estimating the overall attendance at 878,000 and a crowd of 105,600 along the streets for the Fat Tuesday finale.

== Glossary ==
The Mobile Mardi Gras season uses several terms which have specific meanings for the events:

- Carnival: the festival season, generally from January 6, Twelfth Night, to Mardi Gras, the Tuesday before Ash Wednesday;
- Lundi Gras: ("Fat Monday") the Monday before Lent;
- Mardi Gras: ("Fat Tuesday") the Tuesday before Lent, also refers to the general several weeks of Carnival festival;
- King Felix III: the contemporary king of the Mobile Mardi Gras;
- mystic society: secret society formed for any annual Carnival events;
- parade krewe: a society that has annual, organized parades;
- tableau: a pageant event; and
- throw: any gift thrown from a float to the spectators.

== See also ==
- Mardi Gras in the United States
- Mobile Carnival Museum
- Mystic society
