= Henry Harnden =

Union Army general

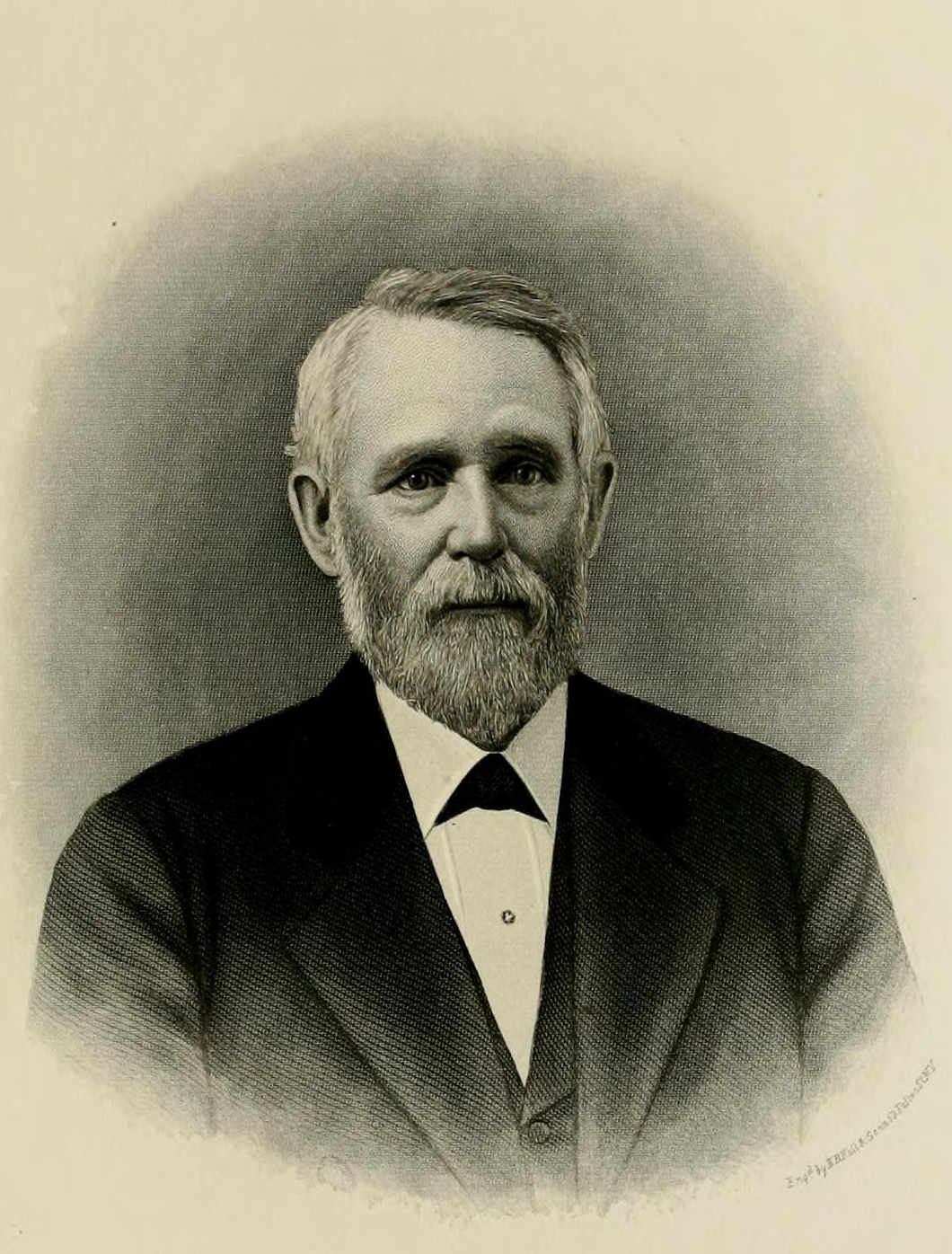

Member of the Wisconsin State Assembly from the Jefferson 4th district
- In office January 1, 1866 – January 7, 1867
- Preceded by: William P. Forsyth
- Succeeded by: Jost D. Petrie

Personal details
- Born: March 4, 1823 Wilmington, Massachusetts, U.S.
- Died: March 17, 1900 (aged 77) Madison, Wisconsin, U.S.
- Resting place: Forest Hill Cemetery, Madison, Wisconsin
- Party: Republican
- Spouse: Mary A. Lightner (m. 1848–1900)
- Children: Jennie (Main); (b. 1854; died 1933); 3 others

Military service
- Allegiance: United States
- Branch/service: United States Volunteers; Union Army
- Rank: Lt. Colonel, USV; Brevet Brig. General, USV
- Unit: 1st Reg. Wis. Vol. Cavalry
- Battles/wars: American Civil War; Battle of Cape Girardeau; Chickamauga campaign; Battle of Chickamauga; Chattanooga campaign; Atlanta campaign; Battle of Rocky Face Ridge; Battle of Resaca; Battle of New Hope Church (WIA); Wilson's Raid; Battle of West Point (WIA)

Henry Harnden (March 4, 1823 – March 17, 1900) was an American sailor, Republican politician, and Wisconsin pioneer. He served as a Union Army officer during the American Civil War and led the Wisconsin cavalry regiment which was credited in the capture of Confederate president Jefferson Davis. After the war, he was granted an honorary brevet to brigadier general. He also went on to serve one term in the Wisconsin State Assembly, representing eastern Jefferson County.

== Early life ==
Henry Harnden was born in March 1823 at Wilmington, Massachusetts. He had a common school education there, but left school at age 18 to work as a deckhand on a merchant ship, inspired by his uncles' tales of their seafaring careers. He traveled at sea for five years, visiting the west coast of Africa, navigating around Cape Horn, and traveling along the entire west coast of South America and Mexico. In subsequent trips, he spent time in the Caribbean Sea and Gulf of Mexico, making trips between the south coast of the United States and the islands.

He was still working in the Gulf of Mexico at the outbreak of the Mexican–American War. He witnessed General Zachary Taylor land his army at Brazos Santiago and assisted ferrying wounded American soldiers back to New Orleans after the Battle of Palo Alto. He fell ill shortly after this trip and returned home to Massachusetts to recuperate.

He went to work as a clerk in a store at Lowell, Massachusetts, for several years. In 1850, he left Massachusetts for California, traveling over land, to participate in the California Gold Rush. His trip was difficult, and he ran into hostilities with Native American groups along the way. His gold pursuits in California were also unsuccessful, and he quickly abandoned the idea. To return home, he went to work as a sailor again on a voyage from California to Boston around the southern end of South America.

In 1852, he sought out farm land in the new state of Wisconsin. He settled in the town of Sullivan, in Jefferson County. He soon gave up farming and engaged in lumbering instead, establishing and managing a steam-powered sawmill.

== Civil War service ==
At the outbreak of the American Civil War, Harnden summoned his employees at the sawmill. He informed the men that the mill would shut down, that he would personally enlist in the Union Army, and that he encouraged all of them to do so as well—which they all did. Harnden joined as a private in the battalion of cavalry which was being organized at Ripon, Wisconsin, in the summer of 1861. At the time, Wisconsin was only authorized to raise one battalion of cavalry (four companies). That fall, however, additional recruitment was authorized and the battalion was expanded to a full regiment (12 companies) and designated the 1st Wisconsin Cavalry Regiment. The regiment was relocated to Kenosha, Wisconsin, where they completed their recruitment and formation. Harnden was promoted to sergeant, and then captain of Company L.

=== Southeastern Missouri operations (summer 1862 – spring 1863) ===
The regiment mustered into federal service in March 1862, and proceeded to St. Louis for operations in the western theater of the war. After receiving their equipment at Benton Barracks, they were sent down the Mississippi River to Cape Girardeau, Missouri, where their colonel, Edward Daniels, took command of the outpost.

Through the spring and summer of 1862, they were engaged in scouting and anti-guerilla activity in southeast Missouri. Colonel Daniels, however, was not content to sit in that defensive position, and organized a raid into Arkansas in the summer. Harnden played an important role, leading an advance team of 100 men to Scatterville, Arkansas. There, he surprised a force of about 125 rebels, killing eight and taking fourteen prisoners. They also captured a large number of rifles, horses, and mules. The regiment continued its march through northeast Arkansas, reaching Jonesboro without encountering further resistance.

From Jonesboro, Harnden was again sent out in advance to take control of Cache River Bridge, where he captured ten more rebel soldiers and a lieutenant colonel—the inspector general of rebel forces in that part of Arkansas. The regiment then continued to Madison, Arkansas, where they captured a rebel steamship. From Madison, they went to Memphis, Tennessee, where they received orders to return to their post in southeast Missouri. The regiment was split into battalions on their return route, and suffered from ambushes during the march.

By the end of September, the regiment was racked with disease, leaving 400 men sick and unable to travel at Cape Girardeau, Missouri. Captain Harnden was then acting as commander of the regiment, with only 2 other officers and 60 men fit for duty during much of that Fall.

In the spring of 1863, Confederate general John S. Marmaduke began his expedition against Union forces in southeast Missouri. The 1st Wisconsin Cavalry were among the defenders at the Battle of Cape Girardeau, holding out until relieved by Union reinforcements, then leading the pursuit of the enemy.

=== Chickamauga & Chattanooga (summer–winter 1863) ===
In April, they were attached to the Army of the Cumberland and ordered to report to Nashville, Tennessee, arriving in early May. They were assigned to the Cavalry wing of the Army of the Cumberland during their operations against Braxton Bragg in middle Tennessee. In September, the regiment participated in the fighting at the Battle of Chickamauga, operating on the Union right flank. They skirmished with the enemy cavalry over the course of several days until ordered to withdraw to Chattanooga after the disastrous Union defeat.

After the retreat, Bragg's army besieged the Union forces at Chattanooga, hoping to starve them into surrender. Associated with this plan, Confederate forces raided and destroyed Union supplies north of Chattanooga. The 1st Wisconsin Cavalry was the lead regiment sent out to check the rebels north of the city and keep the supply lines open. They pursued the Confederate raiders and overtook their rear guard, claiming 11 Confederate prisoners and liberated a number of Union prisoners. They then continued the pursuit until engaged in a pitched fight. They prevailed, killing 50 and taking another 42 prisoners, including the staff of Confederate general Joseph Wheeler—who narrowly escaped.

After a few days rest, they joined the general pursuit of the rebel cavalry into Alabama, skirmishing for the next three months along the Tennessee–Alabama border associated with the Chattanooga campaign. They wintered in southeast Tennessee, and received 354 new recruits in March 1864.

=== Atlanta campaign (spring–fall 1864) ===
On May 3, 1864, the 1st Wisconsin Cavalry set off with the advance division on Sherman's Atlanta campaign, engaging in sharp skirmishing through northern Georgia. At the Battle of Rocky Face Ridge, their colonel, Oscar Hugh La Grange, was captured by the enemy and several other officers were wounded. After the Battle of Resaca, Lt. Colonel Torrey went out sick and Major Paine was wounded, leaving Captain Harnden again in command of the regiment. Just a few days later, however, in the Battle of New Hope Church, Harnden led a charge against Confederate cavalry at Burnt Hickory and was also severely wounded when a pistol shot shattered his right arm. Through the next month, the regiment suffered further casualties, as both Lt. Colonel Torrey and Major Paine were killed.

=== Wilson's Alabama campaign (spring 1865) ===
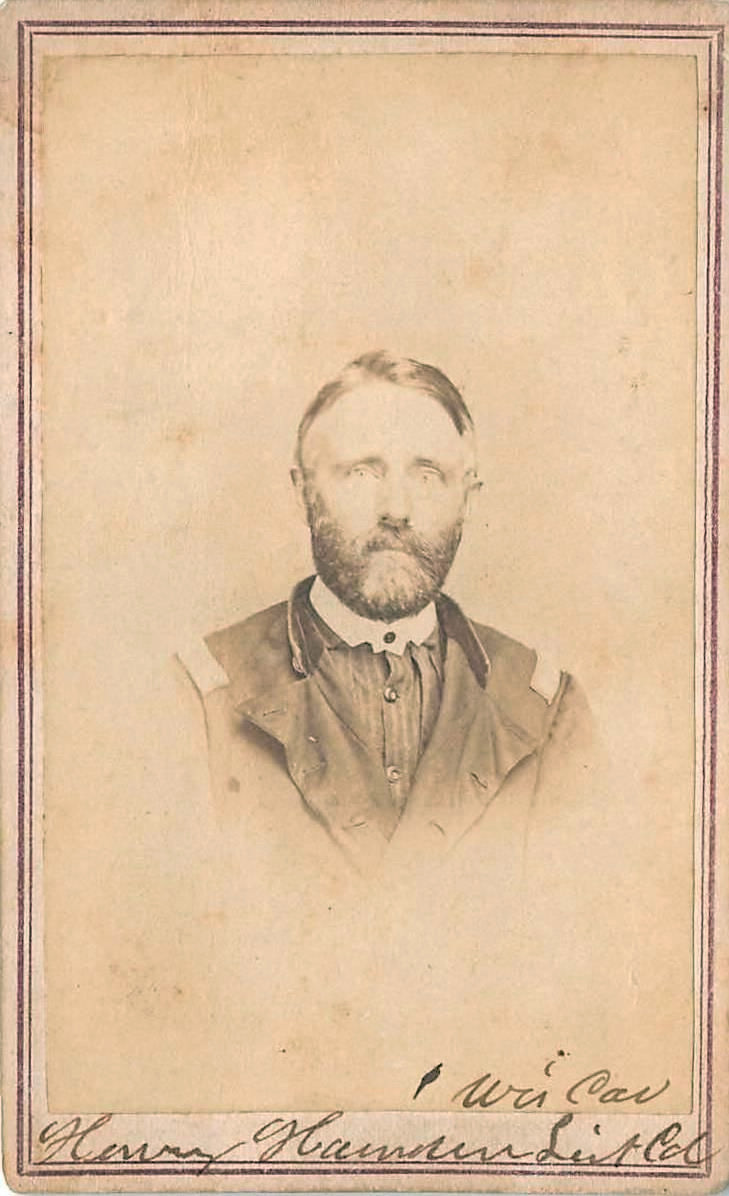
Harnden as a lieutenant colonel

Harnden was sent to a hospital in the north, and during this time was promoted to major, effective back to May 24, 1864. He spent most of the remainder of 1864 recuperating, but returned to his regiment around the time of the Battle of Nashville, and joined General James H. Wilson's pursuit of the Confederate forces under John Bell Hood into northern Alabama. During this time, on January 6, 1865, Harnden was promoted to lieutenant colonel and took command of the regiment, as Colonel La Grange was then in command of the brigade.

During the Battle of West Point, in which Colonel La Grange was in overall command of the Union force, Harnden led the detachment of Kentucky, Indiana, and Wisconsin cavalry which stormed and captured Fort Tyler. Here, Harnden was wounded again, this time shot in the thigh. Though he was only briefly disabled here.

=== Capture of Jefferson Davis (May 1865) ===
As the Union consolidated control of northern Alabama and Georgia, General Wilson selected Lt. Colonel Harnden to take a detachment of the 1st Wisconsin Cavalry to the east to attempt to cut off the escape of Confederate president Jefferson Davis. Arriving at Dublin, Georgia, Harnden learned of a wagon train passing through the region which he believed to carry the Confederate president. He split his command and set off on a rapid pursuit of the train, hunting it through southern Georgia over the next several days.

Near Abbeville, Georgia, Harnden met with Colonel Benjamin D. Pritchard, whose 4th Michigan Cavalry Regiment was assigned to guard duty in the vicinity. Harnden informed Pritchard of the wagon train, which he now believed was camped close by. The next morning, when Harnden's forces attempted to approach the wagon, they came under attack by a barrage of fire, then charged and returned fire, only to find that they had been skirmishing with members of the 4th Michigan Cavalry, which had moved out ahead of them. While this fighting was occurring, other forces of the 4th Michigan Cavalry were entering the Confederate camp and capturing the Confederate general.

A subsequent congressional investigation into the matter determined that the two regiments should share equal credit for the capture, and that Harnden was blameless for the loss of life in the skirmish between the two Union regiments.

Harnden mustered out of federal service July 19, 1865. He was granted two honorary brevets, first to colonel then to brigadier general. President Andrew Johnson nominated Harnden for brevet to brigadier general on January 13, 1866, and the United States Senate confirmed the appointment on March 12, 1866.

== Postbellum years ==
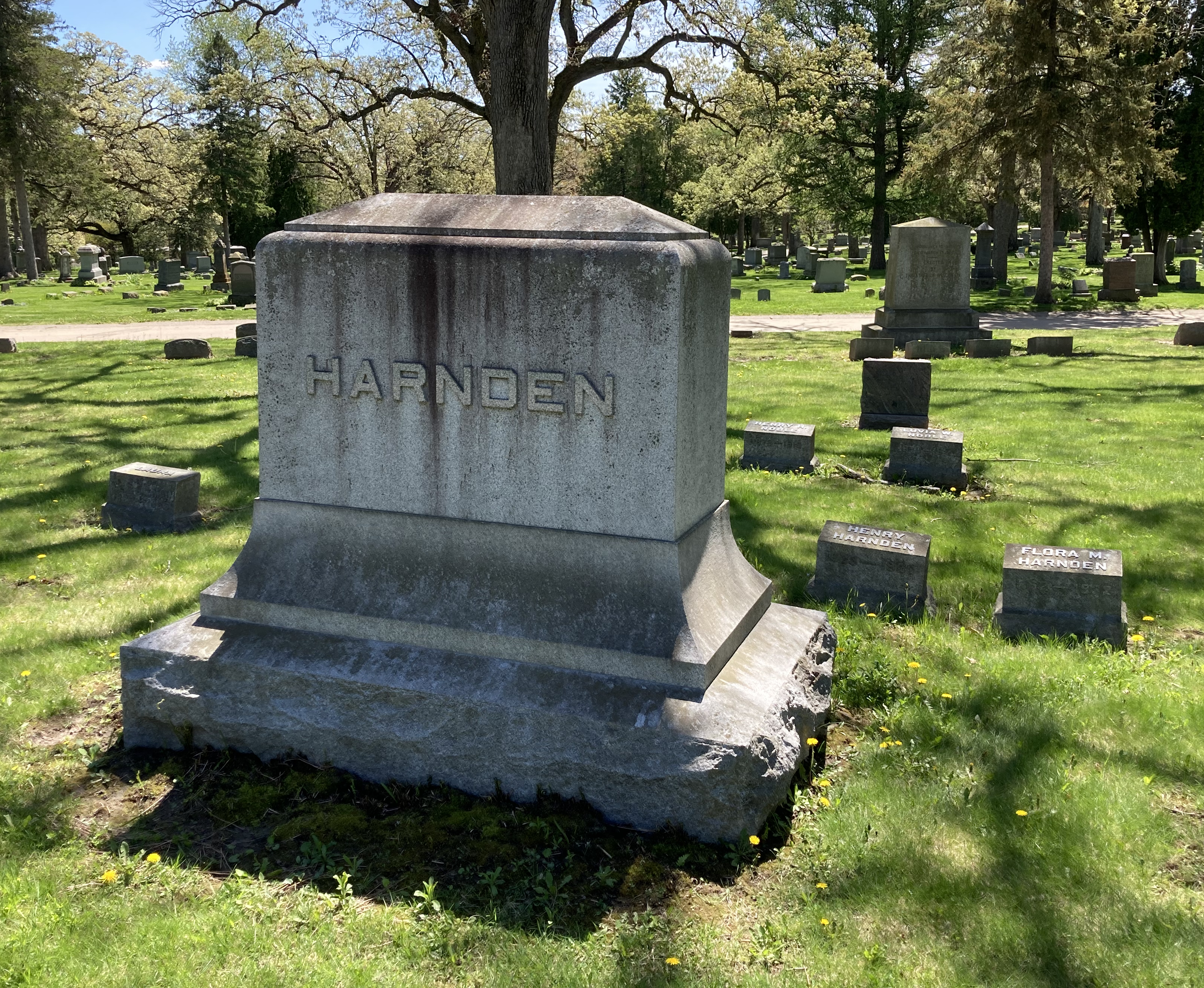
Harnden's grave at Forest Hill Cemetery

After the war, Harnden returned to Wisconsin, settling in Madison. He served one term in the Wisconsin State Assembly (1866), as well as U.S. Assesor (1867–1873), and U.S. Collector of Internal Revenue (1873–1883). In 1899, Harnden was Commander of the Wisconsin Department of the Grand Army of the Republic, serving in that role until his death.

Harnden died of pneumonia at his home in Madison, and was buried there in the historic Forest Hill Cemetery.

Due to the controversies surrounding the capture of Jefferson Davis, Harnden authored a short book, The Capture of Jefferson Davis, published in 1898.

== Personal life and family ==
Henry Harnden was the son of Jonathan and Rhoda Harnden, and was a descendant of Puritan settlers of the Massachusetts Bay Colony. His earliest American ancestors settled at Andover, Massachusetts, in 1640. His grandfather was a lieutenant and his grandfather's brother was a captain in the continental army during the American Revolutionary War. One of his maternal uncles served aboard the USS Hornet and was wounded when it famously captured and sunk the British ship HMS Peacock in the War of 1812. Two of his brothers and thirteen of his nephews served in the Union Army or Union Navy during the Civil War.

He married Mary A. Lightner in December 1848. His wife was a daughter of a Boston attorney. They had four daughters together.

== Published works ==
- Harnden, Henry (1898). The Capture of Jefferson Davis; a narrative of the part taken by Wisconsin troops. Madison, Wisconsin.

== See also ==
- List of American Civil War brevet generals (Union)

Military offices
Preceded by Maj. Nathan Paine	Command of the 1st Wisconsin Cavalry Regiment; October 1864 – July 19, 1865	Regiment disbanded
Wisconsin State Assembly
Preceded by William P. Forsyth	Member of the Wisconsin State Assembly from the Jefferson 4th district January 1, 1866 – January 7, 1867	Succeeded by Jost D. Petrie
