= 1st Wisconsin Cavalry Regiment =

Union Army cavalry regiment

- Flag of Wisconsin
- Active: September 1, 1861 – July 19, 1865
- Country: United States
- Allegiance: Union
- Branch: Cavalry
- Size: Regiment
- Engagements: American Civil War: Battle of Cape Girardeau; Chickamauga campaign; Battle of Chickamauga; Chattanooga campaign; Operations about Dandridge; Battle of Mossy Creek; Battle of Dandridge; Atlanta campaign; Battle of Rocky Face Ridge; Battle of Resaca; Battle of New Hope Church; Wilson's Raid; Battle of Selma; Battle of West Point

Commanders
- Colonel: Edward Daniels
- Colonel: Oscar Hugh La Grange
- Lt. Col.: William H. Torrey (KIA)
- Major: Nathan Paine (KIA)
- Lt. Col.: Henry Harnden

The 1st Wisconsin Cavalry Regiment was a volunteer cavalry regiment that served in the Union Army during the American Civil War. The regiment is most notable as one of two cavalry regiments credited with the final capture of Confederate president Jefferson Davis on May 10, 1865.

== Service ==
The 1st Wisconsin Cavalry was organized at Ripon and Kenosha, Wisconsin, between September 1, 1861, and February 2, 1862. Wisconsin was initially only approved to raise a battalion of four companies of cavalry, but in the Fall of 1861 their allotment was raised to six companies, then to a full regiment of 12 companies. The 1st Wisconsin Cavalry mustered into Federal service on March 10, 1862.

The regiment participated in the capture of Confederate President Jefferson Davis on May 10, 1865.

The regiment was mustered out at Edgefield, Tennessee, on July 19, 1865.

== Total strength and casualties ==
The 1st Wisconsin Cavalry initially recruited 1,124 officers and men. An additional 1,417 men were recruited as replacements, for a total of 2,541 men.

The regiment suffered 6 officers and 67 enlisted men killed or died from wounds in action, and 7 officers and 321 enlisted men who died of disease, for a total of 401 fatalities.

== Commanders ==
- Colonel Edward Daniels (December 3, 1861 – February 5, 1863) resigned.
- Colonel Oscar Hugh La Grange (February 5, 1863 – July 19, 1865) spent most of 1864 and 1865 in command of the brigade. Before joining the regiment, he was captain of Co. B in the 4th Wisconsin Infantry Regiment. After the war he received an honorary brevet to brigadier general.
  - Lt. Colonel William H. Torrey (November 1863 – May 1864) served as acting commander, then served as acting brigade commander when Colonel La Grange was wounded. Killed while commanding the brigade near Atlanta on July 30, 1864. He began the war as major of the regiment.
  - Major Nathan Paine (May 17, 1864 – July 28, 1864) served as acting commander due to illness and injuries until killed near Atlanta on July 28, 1864. Began the war as captain of Co. G.
  - Lt. Colonel Henry Harnden (October 1864 – July 19, 1865) served as acting commander of the regiment. Began the war as captain of Co. L. After the war, he served as a Wisconsin legislator.

== Notable people ==
- John Aaron Baker was enlisted in Co. B and later first lieutenant in Co. I. After the war he served as a Wisconsin legislator.
- James R. Barnett was enlisted in Co. I and rose to the rank of 1st sergeant. After the war he served as a Wisconsin legislator.
- Henry S. Burtch was enlisted in Co. E and wounded at the Battle of Nashville. After the war he served as a Wisconsin legislator.
- Columbus Caldwell was 2nd lieutenant of Co. M and captured at Cleveland, Tennessee. After the war he served as a Wisconsin legislator.
- Elihu Colman was a musician with Co. G. After the war he served as a Wisconsin legislator and U.S. attorney.
- Charles F. Cornwell, son of Almon Cornwell, was a private drafted into Co. G. He died of dysentery in September 1864.
- Asa Kinney was quartermaster of the regiment. Before the war he had served in the Wisconsin Senate.
- Emandus A. Masters, son of Robert Masters, was enlisted in Co. I during the first year.
- Lucius I. Masters, son of Enias D. Masters, was enlisted in Co. A through the entire service of the regiment, rising to the rank of corporal.
- Charles Pettibone was captain of Co. I. Earlier, he was sergeant and 2nd lieutenant in Co. C. After the war he became a newspaper publisher and Wisconsin state senator.
- Henry Putnam was a corporal in Co. B. After the war he served as a Wisconsin state senator.
- Nathaniel S. Robinson was assistant surgeon of the regiment during 1865. After the war he served as a Wisconsin legislator.
- Hiram S. Town was adjutant of the regiment. Earlier, he was 1st lieutenant in Co. E. After the war he served as a Wisconsin state senator.
- Peter J. Williamson was 1st lieutenant of Co. F. Earlier he was sergeant major. After the war, he became a prominent architect.

== See also ==
- List of Wisconsin Civil War units
- Wisconsin in the American Civil War
