= Wilson's Raid =

1865 military campaign of the American Civil War

Coordinates: 33.1596°N 87.3423°W

- Part of the American Civil War
- Operational scope: Strategic offensive
- Location: Alabama and Georgia
- Commanded by: (United States) Bvt. Maj. Gen. James H. Wilson
- Objective: Destroy Confederate military manufacturing, infrastructure, and supplies in Alabama and Georgia
- Date: March 22 – April 20, 1865 (4 weeks and 1 day)
- Executed by: Cavalry Corps, Military Division of the Mississippi
- Outcome: Union victory

Wilson's Raid (March 22 – April 20, 1865) was a successful military campaign conducted by the United States Cavalry in the Western Theater of the American Civil War. The Union Army's strategic offensive was designed to destroy Confederate military manufacturing, infrastructure, and supplies in Alabama and Georgia.

== Background ==
After Major General George H. Thomas's victory over General John B. Hood's Army of Tennessee in December of 1864 at the Battle of Nashville, the Army of the Cumberland found itself with virtually no organized resistance in the heart of the Confederacy. Thomas ordered Brevet Brigadier General James H. Wilson (who commanded the Cavalry Corps of the Military Division of the Mississippi, but was attached to Thomas's army) to lead a cavalry raid to destroy the arsenal at Selma, Alabama, in conjunction with Major General Edward Canby's operations against Mobile. Selma was strategically important as one of the few Confederate posts remaining in Southern hands. The town contained an arsenal, a naval foundry, gun factories, a powder mill, military warehouses, and several railroad repair shops.

== Prelude ==
Wilson led approximately 13,500 cavalrymen in three divisions, commanded by Brigadier Generals Edward M. McCook, Eli Long, and Emory Upton. Each man was armed with the formidable seven-shot Spencer repeating rifle. Thomas's principal opponent was Lieutenant General Nathan Bedford Forrest, whose cavalry corps of the Department of Alabama, Mississippi, and East Louisiana consisted of about 2,500 troopers organized into two small divisions led by Brigadier Generals James R. Chalmers and William H. Jackson, two understrength brigades under Brigadier General Philip D. Roddey and Colonel Edward Crossland, and militia.

== The raid ==
Key commanders
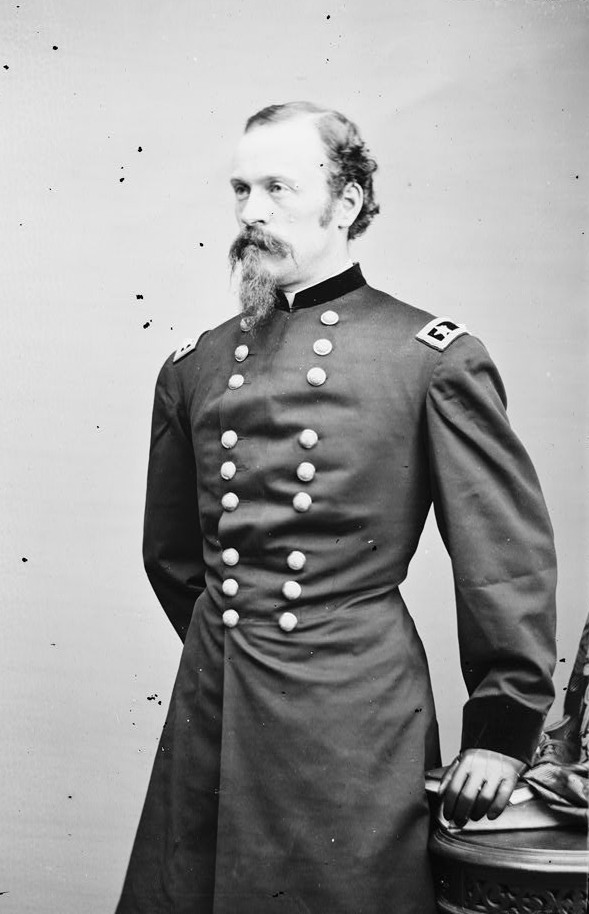
Bvt. Maj. Gen.
James H. Wilson,
USA

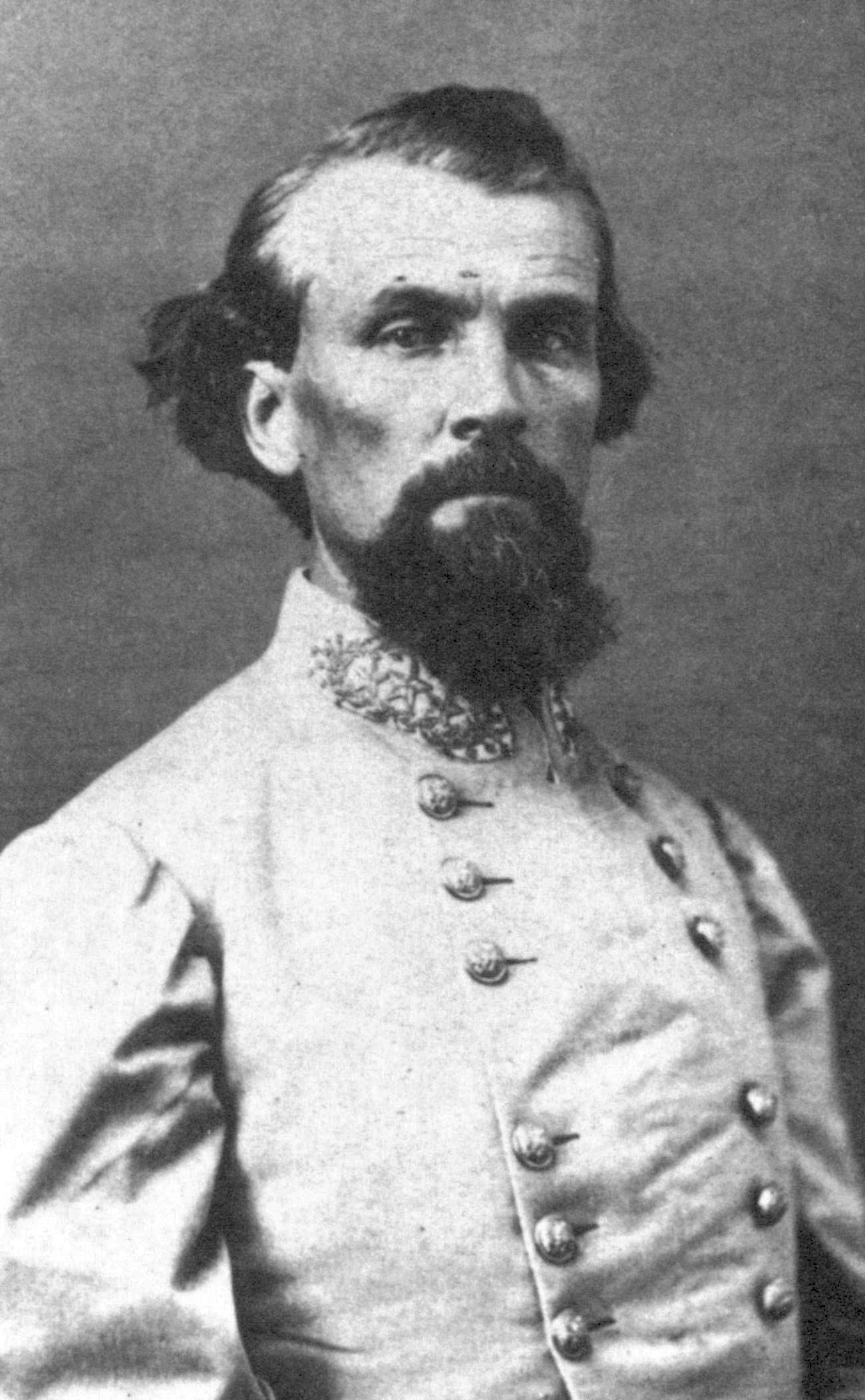
Lieut. Gen.
Nathan B. Forrest,
CSA

Wilson was delayed in crossing the rain-swollen Tennessee River, but he got underway on March 22, 1865, departing from Gravelly Springs in Lauderdale County, Alabama. He sent his forces in three separate columns to mask his intentions and confuse the enemy; Forrest learned very late in the raid that Selma was the primary target. Minor skirmishes occurred at Houston on March 25 and Black Warrior River on March 26, and Wilson's columns rejoined him at Jasper, Alabama, on March 27. On March 28, 1865, at Elyton, in present-day Birmingham, another skirmish occurred, and the U.S. Army soldiers destroyed the Oxmoor and Irondale iron furnaces. A detachment of General Emory Upton's division destroyed the C.B. Churchill and Company foundry in Columbiana and the Shelby Iron Works in Shelby on March 31.

Wilson also detached a 1,500-man brigade under Brig. Gen. John T. Croxton and sent them south and west to burn the Roupes Valley Ironworks at Tannehill and Bibb Naval Furnace at Brierfield on March 31. They then burned the University of Alabama in Tuscaloosa, which was a prominent military school, on April 4. This movement diverted Chalmer's division away from Forrest's main force. Croxton continued his raid across Alabama, destroying several iron works and fighting Confederate General Benjamin J. Hill's brigade at Munford. He finally rejoined Wilson at Macon, Georgia, on May 1, 1865.

The Wilson's Raid battles:

Selma (April 2, 1865)

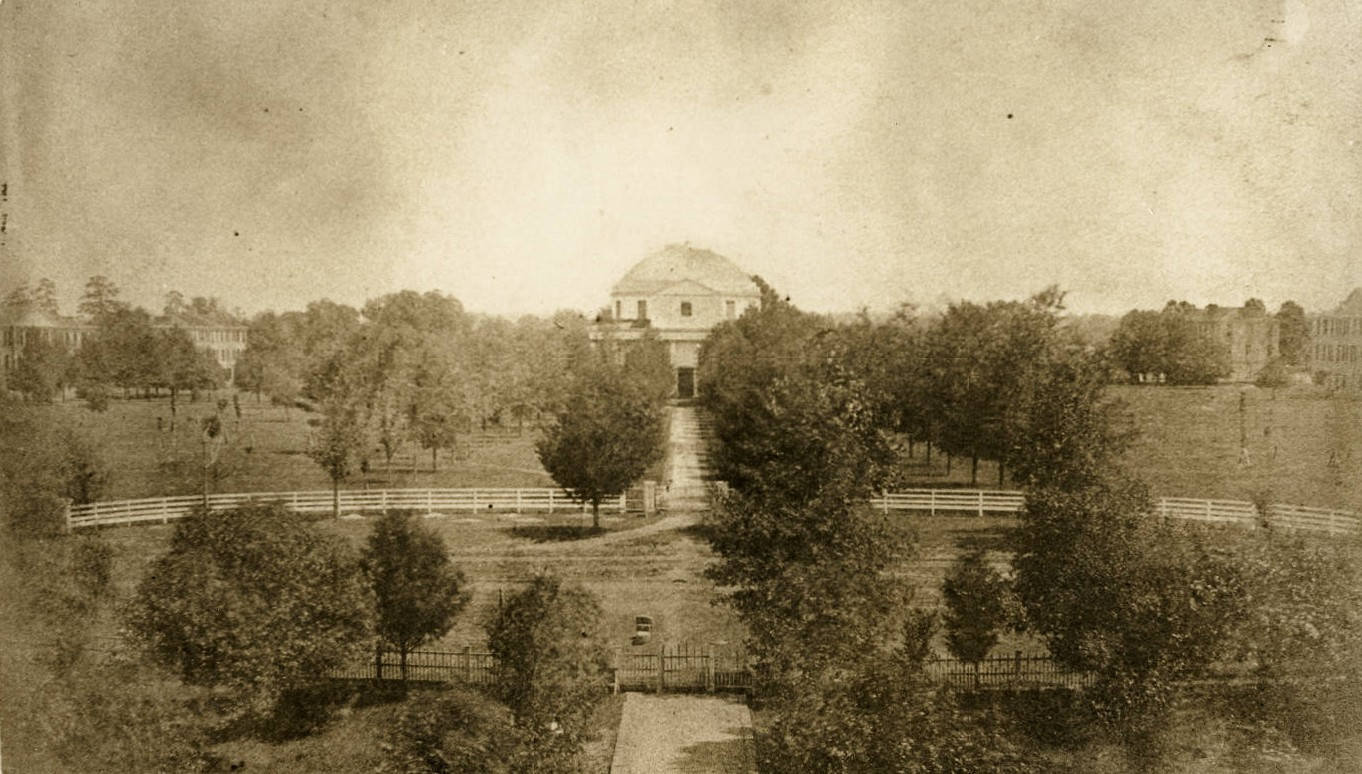
View of the Quad at the University of Alabama at Tuscaloosa in 1859. The rotunda can be seen at the center, with the halls in the background. The college buildings were all destroyed by Federal cavalry on April 4, 1865.

On March 31, Forrest was routed by the larger, better-armed U.S. force at Montevallo. The cavalrymen under Chalmers had not arrived to reinforce Forrest, but he could not wait. U.S. soldiers overran Forrest's headquarters during the action, capturing documents that gave valuable intelligence concerning his plans. Wilson dispatched McCook to link up with Croxton's brigade at Trion (now Vance) and then led the remainder of his force rapidly toward Selma. Forrest made a stand on April 1 at Plantersville, near Ebenezer Church, and was routed once again at the Battle of Ebenezer Church. The Confederates raced toward Selma and deployed into a three-mile, semicircular defensive line anchored at both ends by the Alabama River. The Battle of Selma took place on April 2. The divisions of Long and Upton assaulted Forrest's hastily constructed works. The dismounted U.S. soldiers broke through by afternoon, after brief periods of hand-to-hand combat; the inexperienced militiamen abandoning their positions and fleeing was the primary reason for the entire line breaking. General Wilson personally led a mounted charge of the 4th United States Cavalry Regiment against an unfinished portion of the line. General Long was severely wounded in the head during the assault. Forrest, who was also injured, and whose small corps was severely damaged, regrouped at Marion, where he finally rejoined Chalmers. Wilson's men worked for over a week to destroy military facilities. From there, Wilson's forces moved toward Montgomery, which they occupied on April 12.

West Point (April 16, 1865)

Despite Robert E. Lee's April 9 surrender of the Army of Northern Virginia following the Battle of Appomattox Court House, the Army of Tennessee under the command of Gen Joseph E. Johnston had not yet surrendered the Confederate forces in the Carolinas, Georgia, and Florida. Wilson planned to head east into Georgia to destroy the remaining arsenals and munitions and to cause any remaining local forces to "disintegrate." Wilson's success in this plan would be accelerated if his forces could secure at least one of several key bridges over the Chattahoochee River. One such bridge led into the town of West Point. Wilson separated his force to avoid any delay in the raid, sending a 3,700-man detachment under Colonel Oscar Hugh La Grange to capture both the bridge and the town. Simultaneously, Wilson ordered Upton's division to rush toward another strategically important bridge at Columbus, Georgia. The Battle of West Point, Georgia, was fought on Easter Sunday, April 16, when Colonel Oscar Hugh La Grange's brigade attacked an earthwork defensive position named Fort Tyler that was defended by a couple hundred young men and teenaged defenders under Confederate Brigadier General Robert C. Tyler.

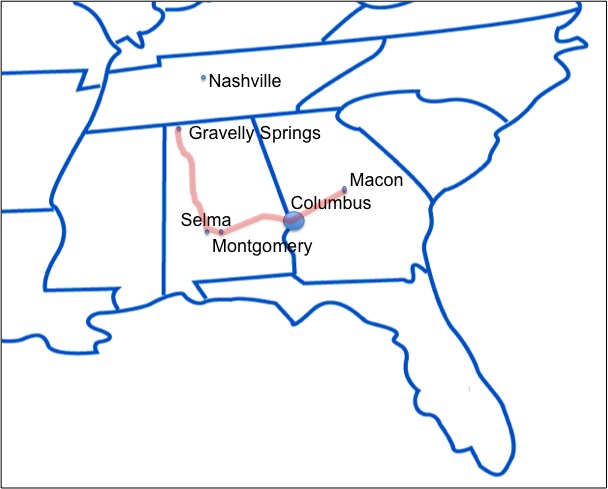
The route the United States Cavalry under Wilson took on the raid that passed through Columbus, Georgia.

Determined to fight to the last ditch, the Confederates fought a wave of dismounted United States cavalrymen. The Confederates did not stand a chance as they were largely outnumbered and poorly armed, whereas the U.S. Army soldiers were armed with repeaters. The United States cavalrymen crossed over a ditch while the rebels hurled primitive hand-grenades and fired their weapons. Although the U.S. soldiers had to assault under the fire of one 32-pounder gun and two 12-pounders inside the earthwork, the fort was captured. Confederate Brigadier General Robert C. Tyler was mortally wounded by a sharpshooter, becoming the last general officer killed in the Civil War. The defense of West Point was doomed to fail and had done so. With rebel prisoners, the fort, and the bridge in his hands, La Grange moved out to rejoin Wilson. The battle had been won for the United States at the cost of 36 casualties, both killed and wounded. The Confederates had lost 18 men killed, 28 wounded, and the remainder captured. With most of the dead southerners in the fort, one Yankee artilleryman said the dead Confederates wore "an awful look."

Columbus (April 16, 1865)
In a separate battle on Easter Sunday, April 16, Wilson was victorious in the Battle of Columbus, in which Upton's division clashed with Confederate forces at Columbus, capturing the city and its naval works and burning, then scuttling the incomplete ironclad ram, CSS Jackson. This engagement is regarded as the "Last Battle of the Civil War."

On April 20, Wilson's men captured Macon, Georgia, without resistance, and Wilson's Raid came to an end. This was only six days before General Joseph E. Johnston's surrender of all Confederate troops in the Carolinas, Georgia, and Florida to William T. Sherman in North Carolina.

== Aftermath ==
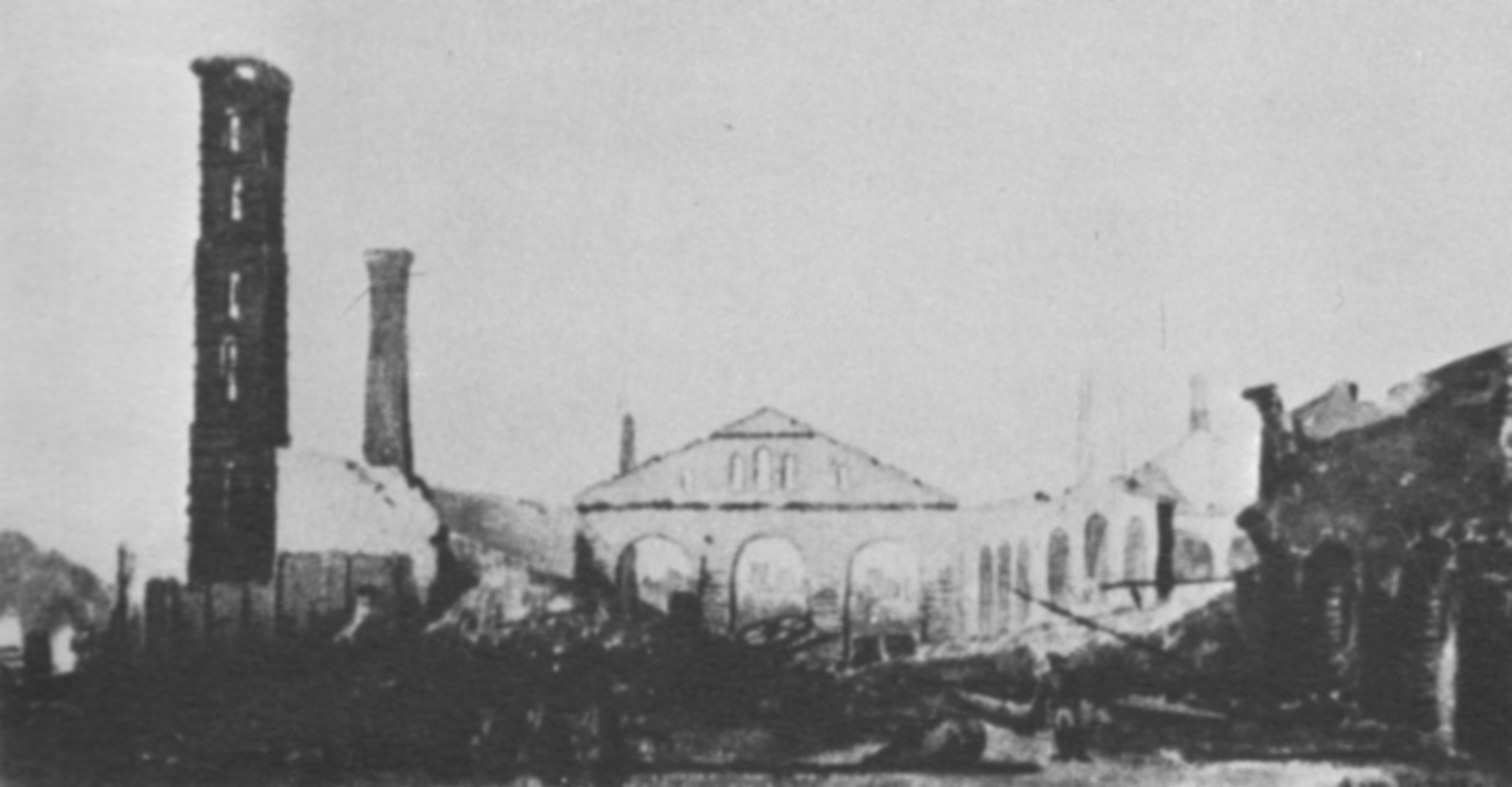
Ruins of the Confederate States Naval Foundry at Selma in 1865.

Wilson's Raid had been a spectacular success. His men captured five fortified cities, 288 cannons, and 6,820 prisoners, at a cost of 725 U.S. casualties. Forrest's casualties, from a much smaller force, numbered 1,200. Wilson completed the raid without destroying plantation property that characterized Sherman's March to the Sea of the previous year. Residents accused Wilson's men of sacking Selma after the battle. Still, the damage came from many sources, including street combat that continued into the night, 35,000 bales of cotton, and the Central Commercial Warehouse fired by Confederates as the city fell. Some U.S. soldiers and newly liberated formerly enslaved people engaged in plunder. After the first night, Wilson re-established discipline.

Upon conclusion of the raid, and following the surrender of all of the Confederate forces east of the Chattahoochee River by Johnston to Sherman, the hostilities in the theater ended. However, the pursuit of fleeing officials of the Confederate government commenced as Wilson's forces fanned out through the region. Confederate President Jefferson Davis was captured on May 10, 1865, near Irwinville, Georgia.
