= James Hook =

James Hook may refer to:

- Captain Hook, the villain of J. M. Barrie's play and novel Peter Pan
- James Hook (composer) (1746–1827), English composer and organist
- James Hook (priest) (1771–1828), English priest, Dean of Worcester
- James Clarke Hook (1819–1907), English painter
- James Schley Hook (1824–1907), American jurist from Georgia
- James Hook (rugby union) (born 1985), Welsh international rugby union player
