= Battle of Munford =

1865 battle of the American Civil War

- Part of the American Civil War
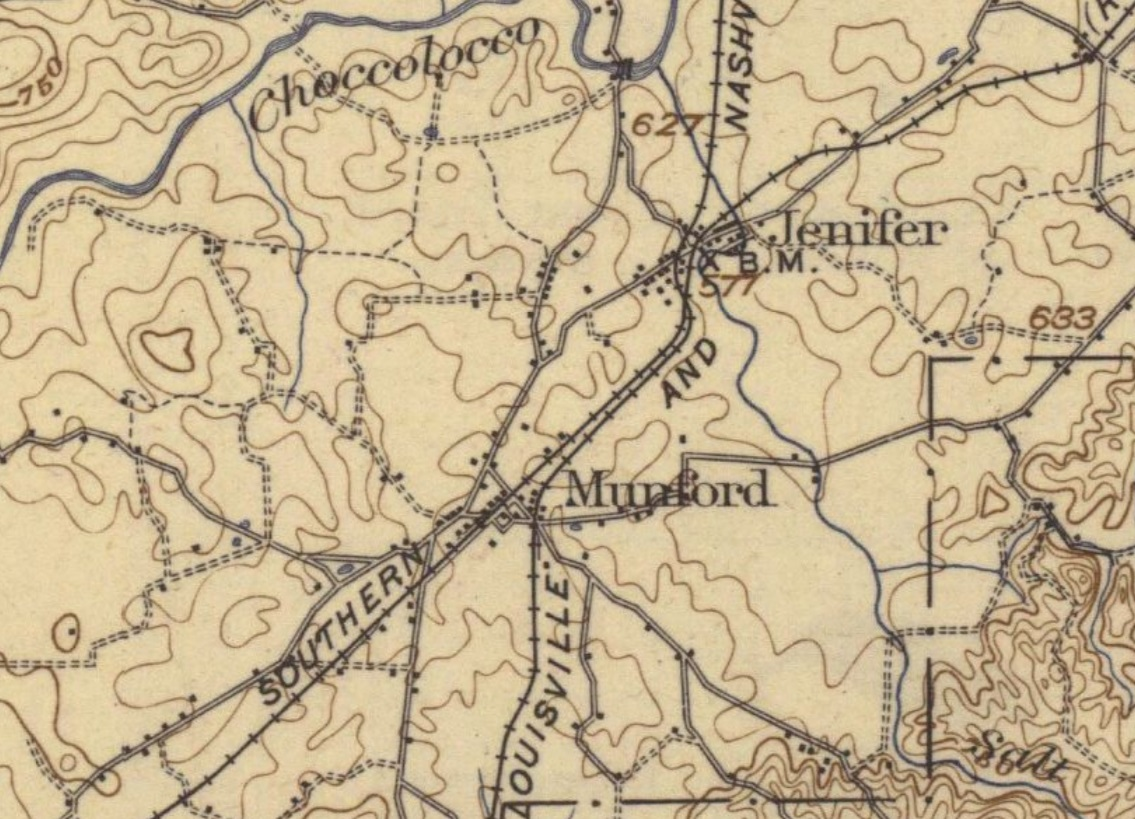
- Munford and vicinity
Date	April 23, 1865 (161 years ago)
Location	Munford, Alabama 33.533494°N 85.954242°W
Result	Union victory

Belligerents
United States (Union)	Confederate States

Commanders and leaders
(United States) John T. Croxton	(Confederate States of America) Benjamin J. Hill

Units involved
Croxton's Brigade; 2nd Michigan Cavalry; 4th Kentucky Mtd. Infantry; 6th Kentucky Cavalry; 8th Iowa Cavalry	Hill's Brigade; Lowe's Alabama Cavalry; Hays' Tennessee Cavalry; One section of artillery

Strength
1,500	500

Casualties and losses
Total: 26; Killed: 4 Wounded: 15; Captured or Missing: 7	Total: 15; Killed: 1 Wounded: unknown Captured: 14
- The 2nd Michigan Cavalry (the advance regiment of the brigade) lost two men killed, five missing and two captured in the charge through Munford. In rearguard actions, the 8th Iowa Cavalry lost two men killed.
- Location within Alabama

The Battle of Munford took place in Munford, Alabama, on Sunday, April 23, 1865, during the raid through the state by 1,500 Union Army cavalrymen under General John T. Croxton, part of the force participating in Wilson's Raid. The Battle of Munford and a minor action at Hendersonville, North Carolina on the same day were the last battles of the American Civil War east of the Mississippi River.

== Battle ==
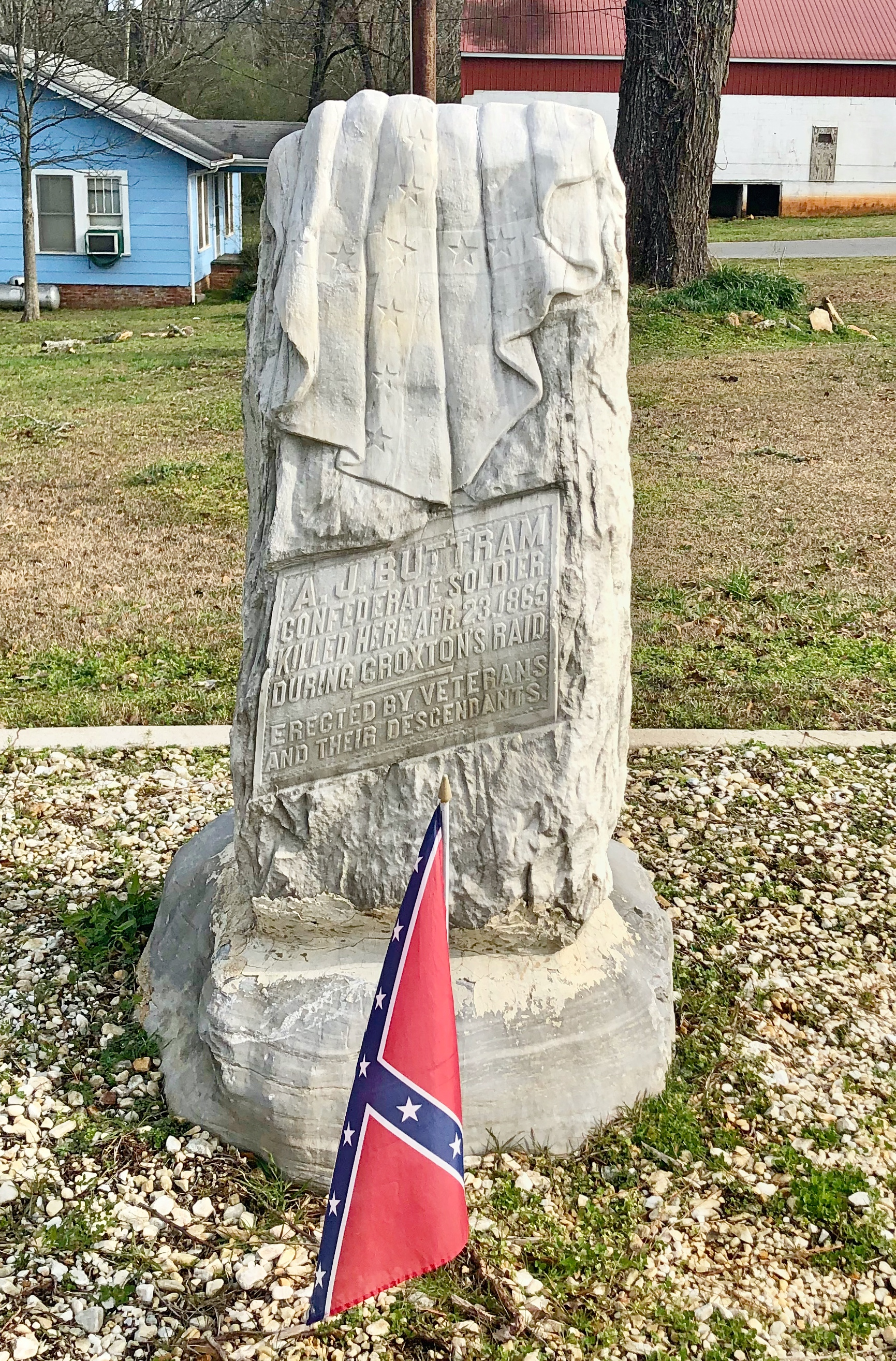
The Andrew J. Buttram Memorial. Buttram was the last Confederate soldier killed east of the Mississippi.

The Confederate soldiers in the battle were described as convalescents, home guards, and pardoned deserters, while the Union cavalry was a veteran force armed with 7-shot Spencer repeating carbines. The Confederates were commanded by General Benjamin Jefferson Hill. Lieutenant Lewis E. Parsons had two cannons which fired several rounds before they were overrun. The Union troops won the brief battle. Parsons was appointed provisional governor of Alabama in June after the war's end.

The Union and Confederate soldiers killed that day are described by author Rex Miller as the last to die in open combat by contending military forces.

THE LAST BATTLE.

Numerous battles have been written up as "the last fight of the rebellion." Without disputing in regard to the matter it is a fact, not generally known, that a battalion (the saber battalion) of the Second Michigan cavalry, under brevet Major Whittemore, charged the force under General Hill, near Talladega, Alabama, on the 23d of April, 1865, and was supported by the regiment and brigade, scattering the entire Confederate force and capturing the artillery, and many prisoners. This was fourteen days after the surrender at Appomattox, and therefore quite late enough after a cessation of hostilities. The next day the country was filled with small parties returning home—a sadly broken down people.

-Captain Marshall P. Thatcher, Second Michigan Cavalry

Lieutenant Andrew Jackson Buttram was the last Confederate soldier to die in battle east of the Mississippi River, at the Battle of Munford.

== See also ==
- List of American Civil War battles
- List of battles 1801–1900
- Troop engagements of the American Civil War, 1865
