= James R. Barnett =

American politician (1842–1917)

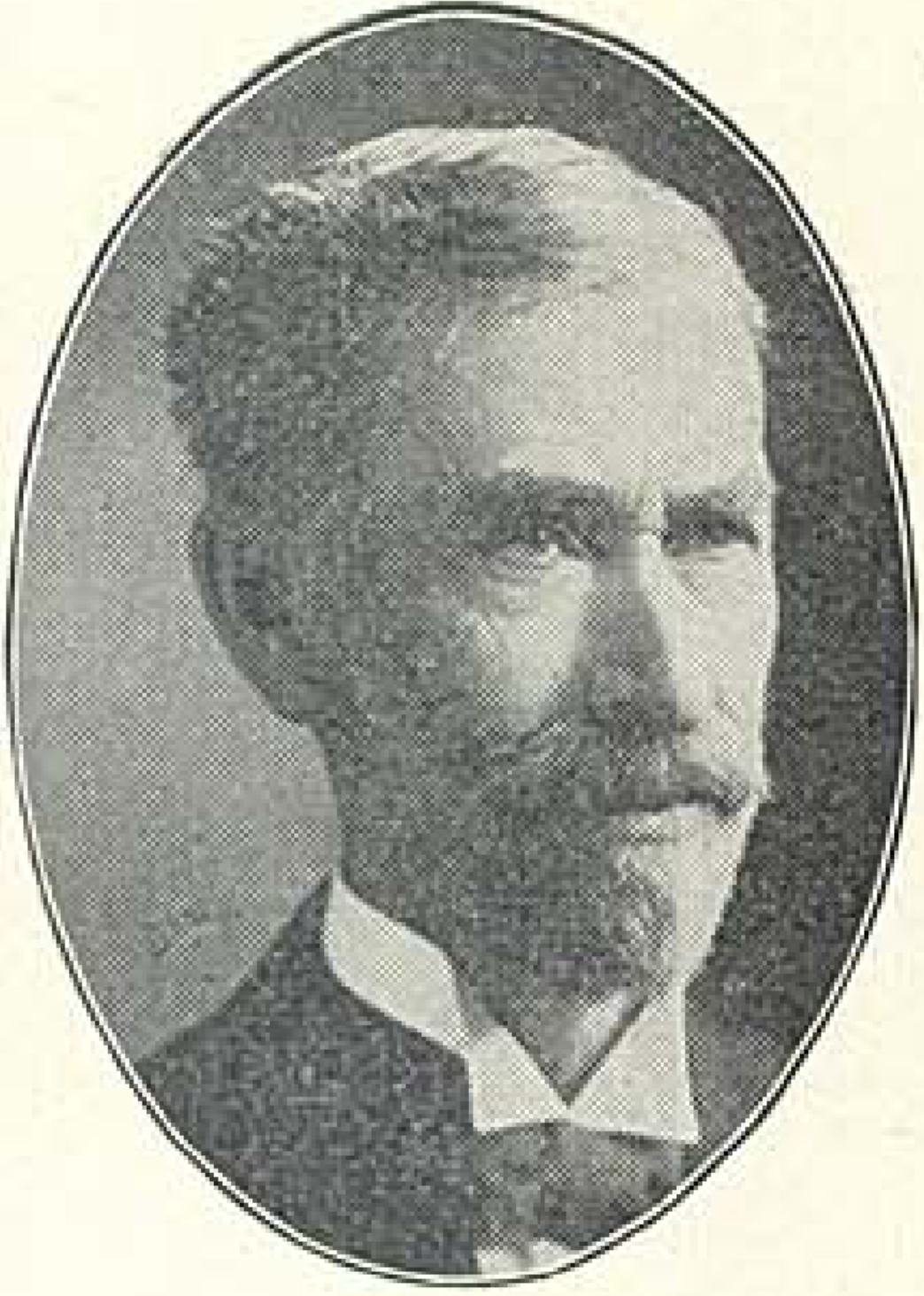
- Portrait from The Blue Book of the State of Wisconsin (1909)

Member of the Wisconsin State Assembly from the Winnebago 2nd district
- In office January 4, 1909 – January 2, 1911
- Preceded by: Merritt L. Campbell
- Succeeded by: Julius H. Dennhardt

Personal details
- Born: May 31, 1842 Pewaukee, Wisconsin Territory
- Died: January 20, 1917 (aged 74) Neenah, Wisconsin, U.S.
- Resting place: Oak Hill Cemetery, Neenah, Wisconsin
- Party: Republican
- Spouse: Emma G. Scribner
- Children: Elizabeth B. (Peck)^{(b. 1872; died 1939)}; James R. Barnett Jr.^{(b. 1875; died 1937)}
- Education: Rush Medical College
- Occupation: Physician, businessman

Military service
- Allegiance: United States
- Branch/service: United States Volunteers; Union Army
- Years of service: 1862–1865
- Rank: 1st Sergeant, USV
- Unit: 1st Reg. Wis. Vol. Cavalry
- Battles/wars: American Civil War

James R. Barnett, Sr., (May 31, 1842 – January 20, 1917) was an American medical doctor, banker, and Republican politician. He served two years in the Wisconsin State Assembly, representing northern Winnebago County.

== Biography ==
Barnett was born on May 31, 1842, in the town of Pewaukee, in what is now Waukesha County, Wisconsin. As a young man, he moved to Fond du Lac County, Wisconsin, and taught school there for two years before the outbreak of the American Civil War.

In the summer of 1862, he volunteered for service in the Union Army and was enlisted as a private in Company I of the 1st Wisconsin Cavalry Regiment. He served with the regiment through the rest of the war, receiving promotions to sergeant and first sergeant. As the regiment was mustering out in July 1865, he was named 1st lieutenant, but was never officially mustered at that rank.

After the war, Barnett attended Rush Medical College and graduated in 1868. He subsequently moved to Neenah, Wisconsin, where he practiced medicine for 45 years.

In addition to his medical practice, Barnett was superintendent of schools, a member of the Neenah board of education, dean of the local medical fraternity, president of the state medical society, and president of the Neenah State Bank.

He was elected to one term in the Wisconsin State Assembly, in 1908, running on the Republican ticket. He was not a candidate for re-election in 1910.

He died at his home in Neenah on January 20, 1917, after an illness of one month.

== Personal life and family ==
Barnett married Emma G. Scribner shortly after graduating from medical school. They had at least two children. Their son, James Jr., also became a medical doctor in Neenah.

== Electoral history ==
Wisconsin Assembly, Winnebago 2nd District Election, 1908
Party	Candidate	Votes	%	±%
General Election, November 8, 1908
Republican	James R. Barnett	1,977	53.26%	+8.24%
Democratic	M. M. Schoetz	1,735	46.74%	−5.88%
Plurality		242	6.52%	-1.09%
Total votes		3,712	100.0%	+39.13%
Republican gain from Democratic				
