= Joseph Bailey (general) =

American Civil War Union Army officer

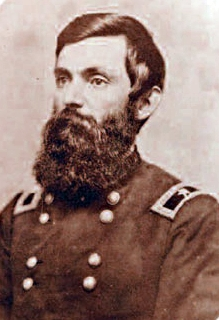
- Brigadier General Joseph Bailey, ca. 1864
- Born: May 6, 1825; Morgan County, Ohio, U.S.
- Died: March 21, 1867 (aged 41) near Nevada, Missouri, U.S.
- Burial place: Evergreen Cemetery, Fort Scott, Kansas
- Military career
- Allegiance: United States
- Branch: United States Volunteers; Union Army
- Service years: 1861–1865
- Rank: Brigadier General; Brevet Major General
- Commands: 4th Reg. Wis. Vol. Cavalry; Engineer Brigade, XIX Corps
- Conflicts: American Civil War; Capture of New Orleans; Siege of Port Hudson; Red River campaign; Battle of Mansfield

Joseph Bailey (May 6, 1825 – March 21, 1867) was an American civil engineer who served as a officer in the Union Army during the American Civil War. He is credited for saving nearly 30,000 troops during the Red River campaign using his engineering skills, and is one of only fifteen officers to receive a Thanks of Congress. He held various command positions in the wester theater of the war from June 1864 until the war's end. After the war, he was elected sheriff of Vernon County, Missouri, where he was shot and killed. He ultimately received a posthumous promotion to brigadier general and brevet major general for his accomplishments.

== Early life ==
Bailey was born near the town of Pennsville in Morgan County, Ohio. He earned a civil engineering degree at the University of Illinois at Urbana–Champaign, then moved to Wisconsin and became a civil engineer and lumberman. After successfully building a log dam on the Wisconsin River for use by lumber raftsmen, he and his wife, Mary, purchased several tracts of land in Kilbourn, Wisconsin (now Wisconsin Dells). He built a home in town with acreage that stretched northward up River Road which included the site of present-day Meadowbrook Resort. Politically, he was a Democrat.

== Civil War ==
Bailey entered the Union Army at the beginning of the war as captain of Company D of the 4th Wisconsin Infantry Regiment. He served as part of Major General Benjamin F. Butler's Army of the Gulf, which occupied New Orleans after Admiral David Farragut captured the city in April 1862. Bailey was named acting chief engineer for the city of New Orleans shortly after its occupation.

Promoted to major in May 1863, Bailey contributed to the Union Army's engineering activities in support of the Siege of Port Hudson. In August 1863, he was promoted to lieutenant colonel when the regiment was redesignated as the 4th Wisconsin Cavalry Regiment.

=== Red River campaign ===
Bailey's engineering skills during Major General Nathaniel P. Banks' ill-fated 1864 Red River campaign are considered the reason the campaign did not result in the loss of the entire 30,000-man Army of the Gulf. Having landed his forces at Simmesport, Louisiana, in March with the intention of moving north along the Red River some 200 miles to capture Shreveport, the headquarters of Confederate General Edmund Kirby Smith, Banks was repulsed at the Battle of Mansfield on April 8, 1864, by Confederate General Richard Taylor and his force of just 12,000 men.

Retreating down the Red River, Banks found the low river level at Alexandria prohibited the passage of Commander David Dixon Porter's fleet of ten Federal gunboats, part of the Union Army's Mississippi Squadron. Hounded by Taylor's forces in the rear, Banks faced the humiliating necessity of abandoning Porter's fleet. Without the fleet's supporting firepower, his entire Army would risk capture before it could return to safety in New Orleans.

Resigned to his fate, Banks reluctantly listened to Porter's suggestion to give Bailey's idea a try. Bailey suggested building a wing dam, similar to those he had built as a Wisconsin lumberman. The dam, Bailey argued, would raise the level of the river. When it was high enough to carry Porter's fleet over the falls, Bailey would blow up the dam, and the fleet would be saved.

Persuaded by Porter, Banks agreed to the plan. For ten days, 10,000 troops worked feverishly on both banks of the River to build the dam. Finally, on May 10, 1864, the river rose, the dam was broken, and the fleet floated past. Porter's fleet and Banks' army were saved. The ruins of Bailey's Dam can be seen to this day in Alexandria.

A grateful United States Congress voted Bailey the Thanks of Congress, making him only one of fifteen army officers to receive such an honor during the Civil War. Of those he was the only who did not command an army or corps at the time. The original Thanks of Congress signed by Abraham Lincoln can be seen on display at the Bank of Wisconsin Dells; other memorabilia and artifacts are displayed at the Dells Country Historical Museum at the Bowman House, and at Meadowbrook Resort in Wisconsin Dells.

== Promotion to general ==
In June 1864, Bailey became the 4th Wisconsin Cavalry's colonel. However, he was soon assigned to command the Engineer Brigade in the XIX Corps in the Department of the Gulf from June through August. He then commanded the District of West Florida from August until November, when he was sent back to Louisiana to take charge of the District of Baton Rouge and Port Hudson. He held other commands in the Western Theater, including command of a cavalry division and an engineer brigade in the Military Division of West Mississippi until the war's end.

On November 10, 1864, President Abraham Lincoln appointed Bailey brigadier general of volunteers to rank from November 19, 1864, and submitted this nomination to the Senate on December 12, 1864, and again on March 7, 1865. The first nomination expired without U.S. Senate confirmation on March 4, 1865, and Bailey resigned from the service on July 7, 1865, before the Senate acted on the second nomination. After Bailey was out of the service, on January 13, 1866, President Andrew Johnson nominated Bailey again for appointment to the grade of brigadier general to rank from November 10, 1864, and the U.S. Senate finally confirmed the appointment on February 23, 1866. On March 28, 1867, President Johnson nominated Bailey posthumously for the award of the brevet grade of major general of volunteers to rank from March 13, 1865, and the U.S. Senate confirmed the award on March 30, 1867.

== Last years ==
Joseph Bailey survived the war by less than two years. In October 1865, he moved with his wife and children to Vernon County, Missouri, where he was elected sheriff. He was shot and killed on March 21, 1867 near Nevada, Missouri, by two brothers he had arrested (but failed to disarm) for stealing a hog. Despite a $3,000 reward, the killers, former bushwhackers Lewis and Perry Pixley, were never brought to justice. A third suspect was lynched. Later William McWaters also fell under suspicion for Bailey's murder, but managed to escape the posse sent to arrest him.

General Bailey was buried with Masonic honors in the military cemetery at Fort Scott, Kansas. His remains were later moved to Evergreen Cemetery, where he rests next to his wife.

A monument to his memory stands in Malta, Ohio, and he is the subject of a biography, Hero of the Red River - The Life and Times of Joseph Bailey.

A memorial mural is painted in Wisconsin Dells depicting the rescue of the US fleet. It is on a building across the street from tourist center downtown, and a block away from site where he built his first dam. He was also one of the founding members of the Wisconsin Dells.

== See also ==
- List of American Civil War generals (Union)
