= Munford, Alabama =

- Town
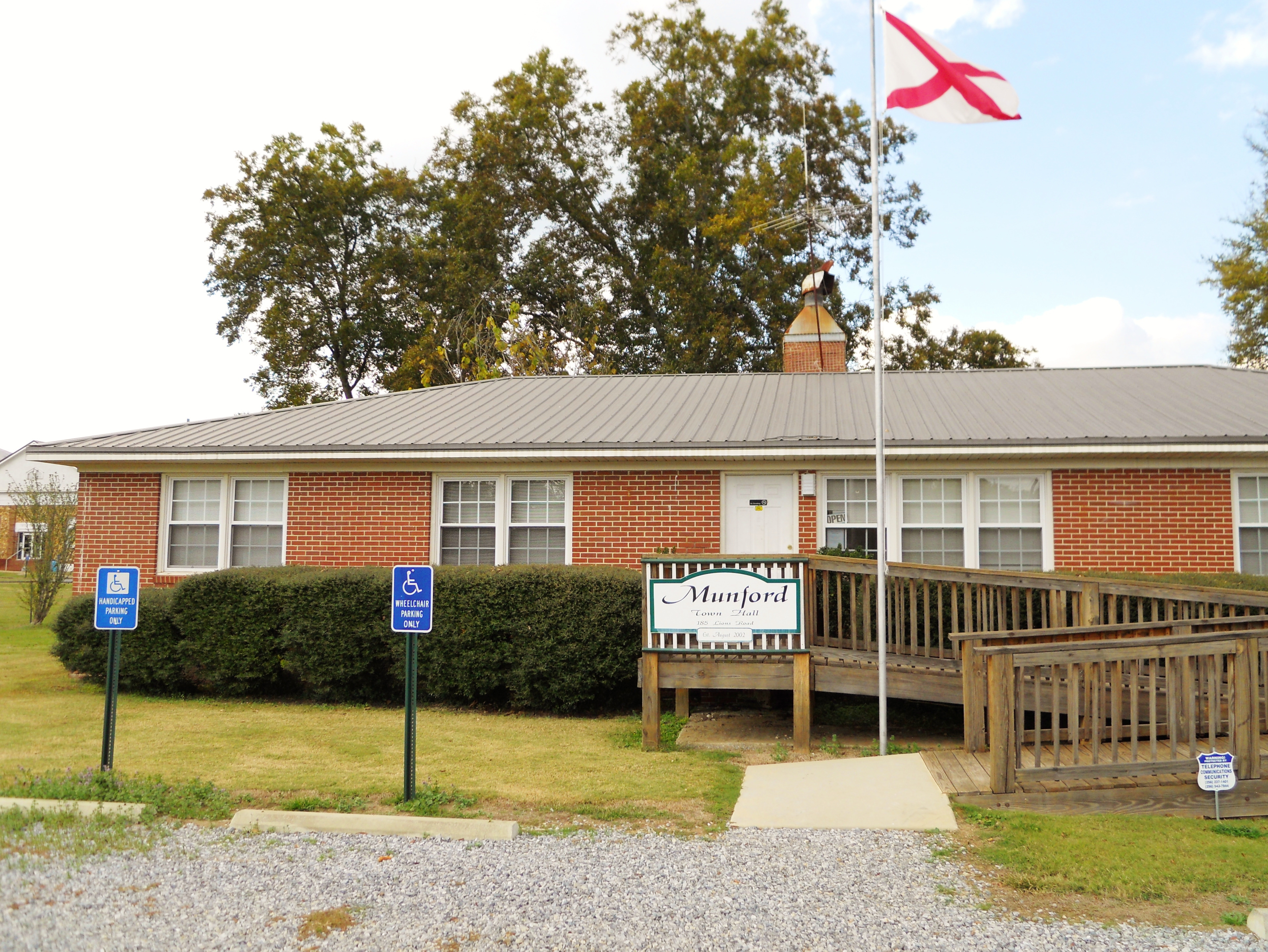
- Munford Town Hall

- Flag Seal

- Location of Munford in Talladega County, Alabama.
- Coordinates: 33°31′33″N 85°57′20″W
- Country: United States
- State: Alabama
- County: Talladega

Area
  - Total: 2.56 sq mi (6.64 km^{2})
  - Land: 2.56 sq mi (6.63 km^{2})
  - Water: 0 sq mi (0.00 km^{2})
- Elevation: 630 ft (190 m)

Population (2020)
  - Total: 1,351
  - Density: 527.5/sq mi (203.66/km^{2})
- Time zone: UTC-6 (Central (CST))
  - Summer (DST): UTC-5 (CDT)
- ZIP code: 36268
- Area code: 256
- FIPS code: 01-52848
- GNIS feature ID: 2424936
- Website: munfordalabama.com

Munford is a town in Talladega County, Alabama, United States. At the 2020 census, the population was 1,351. It is the location of what has been called the last battle of the Civil War east of the Mississippi, the Battle of Munford on April 23, 1865.

== History ==
Munford was initially incorporated in 1873. At some point in the 1880s, it either disincorporated or lost its charter. In 2000, Munford was classified as a census-designated place (CDP), and in 2002 formally incorporated again.

During the American Civil War, the Battle of Munford took place on April 23, 1865. It was the last battle of the war east of the Mississippi River. One of the last Confederate casualties of the war occurred here, with the death of Andrew Jackson Buttram.

== Geography ==
According to the United States Census Bureau, the town has a total area of 2.2 square miles (5.7 km^{2}), all land.

== Demographics ==
Historical population
Census	Pop.	Note	%±
1880	147		—
2000	2,446		—
2010	1,292		−47.2%
2020	1,351		4.6%
U.S. Decennial Census; 2013 Estimate

Munford was listed as a census designated place in the 2000 U.S. Census.

=== 2020 census ===
As of the 2020 census, Munford had a population of 1,351. The median age was 41.6 years. 22.9% of residents were under the age of 18 and 16.5% of residents were 65 years of age or older. For every 100 females there were 92.7 males, and for every 100 females age 18 and over there were 90.3 males age 18 and over.

0.0% of residents lived in urban areas, while 100.0% lived in rural areas.

There were 540 households in Munford, of which 34.4% had children under the age of 18 living in them. Of all households, 40.6% were married-couple households, 21.5% were households with a male householder and no spouse or partner present, and 29.4% were households with a female householder and no spouse or partner present. About 24.6% of all households were made up of individuals and 10.8% had someone living alone who was 65 years of age or older.

There were 595 housing units, of which 9.2% were vacant. The homeowner vacancy rate was 0.9% and the rental vacancy rate was 4.6%.

Munford racial composition
Race	Num.	Perc.
White (non-Hispanic)	1,090	80.68%
Black or African American (non-Hispanic)	191	14.14%
Native American	5	0.37%
Asian	4	0.3%
Pacific Islander	1	0.07%
Other/Mixed	48	3.55%
Hispanic or Latino	12	0.89%

=== 2010 census ===
As of the census of 2010 there were 1,292 people, 492 households, and 355 families residing in the town. The population density was 587.3 inhabitants per square mile (226.8/km^{2}). There were 554 housing units at an average density of 251.8 per square mile (97.2/km^{2}). The racial makeup of the CDP was 82.4% White, 15.6% Black or African American, 0.5% Native American, 0.1% some other race, and 1.3% from two or more races. 1.0% of the population were Hispanic or Latino of any race.

There were 492 households, out of which 40.2% had children under the age of 18 living with them, 49.0% were headed by married couples living together, 17.1% had a female householder with no husband present, and 27.8% were non-families. 24.0% of all households were made up of individuals, and 9.3% were someone living alone who was 65 years of age or older. The average household size was 2.63, and the average family size was 3.11.

In the town, the population was spread out, with 26.6% under the age of 18, 9.1% from 18 to 24, 26.6% from 25 to 44, 25.3% from 45 to 64, and 12.4% who were 65 years of age or older. The median age was 37.1 years. For every 100 females, there were 87.2 males. For every 100 females age 18 and over, there were 84.8 males.

For the period 2007–2011, the estimated median annual income for a household in the town was $46,875, and the median income for a family was $50,278. Male full-time workers had a median income of $28,558 versus $25,809 for females. The per capita income for the CDP was $20,964. About 24.5 of families and 19.9% of the population were below the poverty line, including 32.8% of those under age 18 and 5.8% of those age 65 or over.

== Notable people ==
- Bret Holmes, racing driver
- Donald Stewart, U.S. Senator from 1978 to 1981
