= William McWaters =

American gunfighter

- Born: ca. 1844; Missouri, U.S.
- Died: May 26, 1875; Lincoln, Nebraska, U.S.
- Cause of death: Gunshot wound
- Occupation: Gun fighter
- Spouse(s): Jennie Mayfield? Susie Davis (2 children)
- Conviction: Second degree murder
- Penalty: 21 years imprisonment with hard labor

William McWaters (ca. 1844–1875) was an American gunfighter from Missouri who once rode with William Clarke Quantrill. Though not as well known today as the likes of the James-Younger Gang, McWaters did belong to that fraternity of dangerous men spawned by the Kansas-Missouri border wars and American Civil War.

== Early life ==
William McWaters was the second of eight children raised by Missouri native Hugh McWaters and his Kentucky-born wife Mary. He lived on farms across Missouri in Platte, St. Charles and Cedar counties over the first sixteen years of his life. In the late 1840s McWaters' father, along with John Salmon (a relative of his mother) and a John Dyer, were arrested in St. Charles County for beating up one Alexander Balbridge. The case was later thrown out on grounds that the original court documents failed to list a prosecutor.

According to an 1875 newspaper biographical sketch, McWaters, when not yet thirteen, participated in a pro-slavery raid across the Missouri border into Kansas. When the American Civil War broke out some five years later, McWaters joined a group of guerilla fighters, commonly called bushwhackers. On September 3, 1861, his group sabotaged a bridge that led to the derailment of a Hannibal and St. Joseph Railroad train that carried Union soldiers among its passengers. The attack, which became known as the Platte Bridge Railroad Tragedy, killed nearly twenty passengers and crew and injured scores more.

== Civil War ==
Later McWaters joined a unit of Confederate soldiers led by Jim Gilden, then under the command of General Sterling Price. After six months service he returned to his father's farm only to find that his father and a brother had been killed in the partisan backlash over the railroad derailment, their farm laid to ruin and the rest of his family driven from the county. He then threw his lot in with Confederate guerilla fighters William T. Anderson and the brothers John and Fletch Taylor in taking out his revenge against Union soldiers and sympathizers. Over the course of their campaign McWaters' company reportedly killed a Captain Cheeseman and some forty of his men in skirmishes across Missouri. Later they fell in with Quantrill and crossed over into Kansas where McWaters participated in the Lawrence Massacre in which nearly two hundred men and boys were murdered in retaliation for an 1861 Union raid on Osceola, Missouri.

Quantrill and Anderson had a falling out after they carried their campaign into Arkansas and McWaters chose to return with Anderson to Missouri to continue their guerilla attacks there. News accounts of the day reported that during this time McWaters barely escaped Union capture on a number of occasions, often with the assistance of a Jennie Mayfield.

== Post-war ==
In 1867 McWaters became a suspect in the murder of General Joseph Bailey, sheriff of Bates County. When a citizen recognized McWaters as he and a friend sojourned at Humansville, a posse was formed shortly after the two had hastily left town. The chase ended a few hours later at a roadside way station where the pair was ordered to surrender. Just as it appeared he would comply, McWaters jumped on his horse and escaped in a hail of bullets.

An 1875 account alleges that at some point after the war's end McWaters returned to Platte City where he opened a saloon. Trouble soon followed though, when McWaters fatally shot a man during a dispute and his friend John Taylor was shot and killed by a policeman. It is unclear whether these shootings were part of the same event. McWaters escaped to St. Joseph, Missouri where it is alleged he shot the policeman in a gun battle that "took" the life of Fletch Taylor. {In fact Charles Fletch Taylor died in 1912} McWaters then fled to Wyoming, where he married Susie Davis, Fletch Taylor's former fiancée on December 31, 1868, in Otoe County, Nebraska.

In early February 1873, McWaters and two other men, Woodson and Lacy, had a quarrel with the Wyoming, Nebraska deputy postmaster, a Dr. Wolf (or Wolfe) and later severely assaulted him while he was alone in the post office. The group then rifled through the mail only leaving after failing to find anything of value. A few days later, Granville Hail, a United States Marshall, arrived in town to arrest the trio. The arrest went badly though as Hail was wounded and Dr Wolf killed in the pursuing gun fight. Later McWaters was arrested in St. Louis and brought back to Nebraska where, for some reason, the charges were eventually dropped.

In February 1874, McWaters and a man named John Crook were arrested after a shooting in Nebraska City that killed Rudolf Wirz, a store clerk and wounded two others, including the store's owner, Peter Dold. The two were captured in Iowa a few days later and held over for trial. McWaters and Crook later made their escape after wrestling a gun away from a guard during a shift change and with the help of friends fled to the sanctuary of Indian Territory. The pair soon parted company after a quarrel and McWaters decided to head for Hays City, Kansas where he was recognized and once again arrested. At the time, the cell he was placed in was still under construction and when an opportunity arose while standing near his guard and two workers, McWaters managed to lock the cell door on the three and escape on the back of the local postmaster's horse.

For a short period McWaters hid among the Niitsítapi People in Nebraska or Wyoming, but this came to an end after he killed a warrior during a dispute over a bottle of whiskey. His journey next brought him to Sparta, Oregon where a relative of his resided and he would shoot in the back George Weed, a former Union soldier, after becoming enraged over a gambling dispute and the brass Union Army buttons the man wore on his coat.

== Capture ==
During this time detectives hired by Sherriff Farber of Nebraska City had been searching for McWaters and not long after the Weed murder received a tip that he was hiding in Sacramento, California.

City Intelligence. Taken Back.— Sheriff Farber, of Nebraska City, left for home on Saturday with McWaters, the murderer, who was arrested here by Chief Karcher and Deputy Sheriff O'Neil about two weeks ago. The prisoner expressed his perfect willingness to go, intimating that he would not attempt to escape, but the Sheriff, in order to see that he did not, pinioned him hand and foot, and fastened both his leg irons to a ringbolt in the floor of the car. McWaters promised Chief Karcher that his brother would come out to Sacramento and kill him (the Chief) before a year elapsed, but Karcher didn't seem to feel much worried over the threat. During his stay in the city prison Waters was confined in "Mortimer's cell." On sundry occasions be complained to the officers that something' annoyed him at night and prevented his sleeping, and on Saturday morning be alleged most positively (having evidently been informed of the Mortimer ghost stone?) that during Friday night something caught hold of his right arm, as he lay on his mattress, and forcing it out upon the floor, sat upon it in such a manner that he could not lift it for a long time.

Sacramento Daily Union, Volume 48 - November 1874.

In December 1874, McWaters was found guilty of second degree murder for the killing of Rudolf Wirz. The following month, was sentenced to 21 years of hard labor at the Nebraska State Penitentiary in Lincoln.

== Nebraska State Penitentiary ==
On January 17, 1875, just as he was beginning his long sentence, McWaters instigated a prison uprising that started with the overpowering a guard and the capturing the deputy warden. Through a ruse, with McWaters made up to look like the deputy warden, the convicts were able to gain control of the prison. Their escape was foiled when one of the captured guards managed to untie himself and warn the citizens of Lincoln of what had transpired. Early the next morning a contingent of Company I, 23rd Infantry Regiment (United States) arrived from Omaha and a tense standoff ensued. Eventually McWaters realized there was no hope for escape. The convicts released their hostages, which included the warden's wife, and surrendered. One guard, Jean Grosjean, was wounded in the leg.

== Death ==
William McWaters was shot and killed by a prison guard, on May 26, 1875. Some days earlier the prison staff had been put on alert after word leaked to the warden that McWaters was planning another uprising. On that day, guard Hugh Blaney observed McWaters whispering to another inmate before entering a latrine and a few minutes later when he reappeared with a rock in his hand, Blaney took it as a threat and shot him dead. Later, newspapers sympathetic to the Southern cause would charge that McWaters was shot down without provocation. He was survived by his wife and two children.

== Epitaph ==
From an 1875 print article that appeared in a number American newspapers:

The result has been told. He had a dozen scars on his person and bullet holes in his body, and a dozen times escaped from prison; and his rollicking stories would fill a book. He was thoroughly educated in deeds of violence and never talked about anything else with relish but "getting the drop" on someone. He rode like a Comanche and was as cool and wily as Modoc Jack. His clear, steel eye never glowed except in the excitement of an affray. He had a fine figure, and might have been a gentleman – an Aubrey or Kit Carson.
