= James Schley Hook =

American jurist and Georgia state superintendent of education

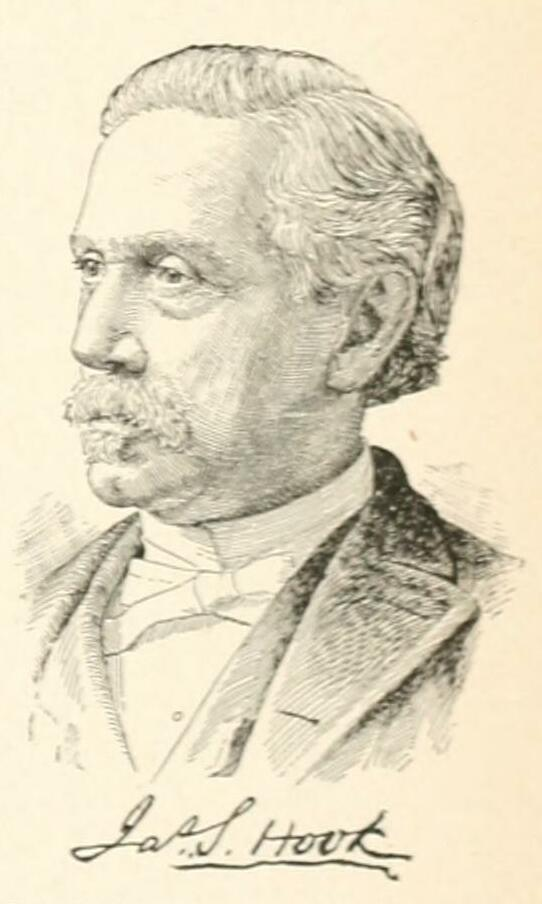
Likeness and signature

James Schley Hook (1824–1907) was an American jurist and Georgia state superintendent of education.

== Lineage ==
James Schley Hook was born at Louisville, Georgia, on March 25, 1834. His father was Daniel Hook, a physician and preacher, for two years mayor of the city of Augusta, Georgia, and his mother, Catherine Schley, sister of Governor William Schley of Georgia.

== Life ==
His father removed to Augusta, Georgia, when his son was six years old, where he received a fair and liberal education. He studied law and was admitted to the bar two months before he was eighteen years old, removed to Sandersville, Washington County, Georgia, and immediately entered upon a large and lucrative practice.

In 1861 he was elected a member of the state legislature and bore an active part in the legislation of the session. He volunteered his services at the outbreak of the Civil War but was not permitted to enlist because of physical disability. In 1862 he succeeded Judge William W. Holt as Judge of the Superior Courts of the Middle Circuit, holding this place until 1867.

He was an elector on the Douglas and Johnson presidential ticket in 1860; was repeatedly suggested for Congress, but having little taste for political life he always urged someone else and got out of the way; was elected a member of the Constitutional Convention of 1865; was suggested at different times for governor and for the United States Senate; removed to Augusta in 1867 and a few years later formed a law partnership with Ex-Judge W. W. Montgomery of the Supreme Court. In 1887 he was appointed state superintendent of education by Governor John B. Gordon, and upon the expiration of his term in 1890 he resumed the practice of the law in Atlanta. He died in 1907.

== Reputation ==
The National Cyclopaedia of American Biography described him in 1901:

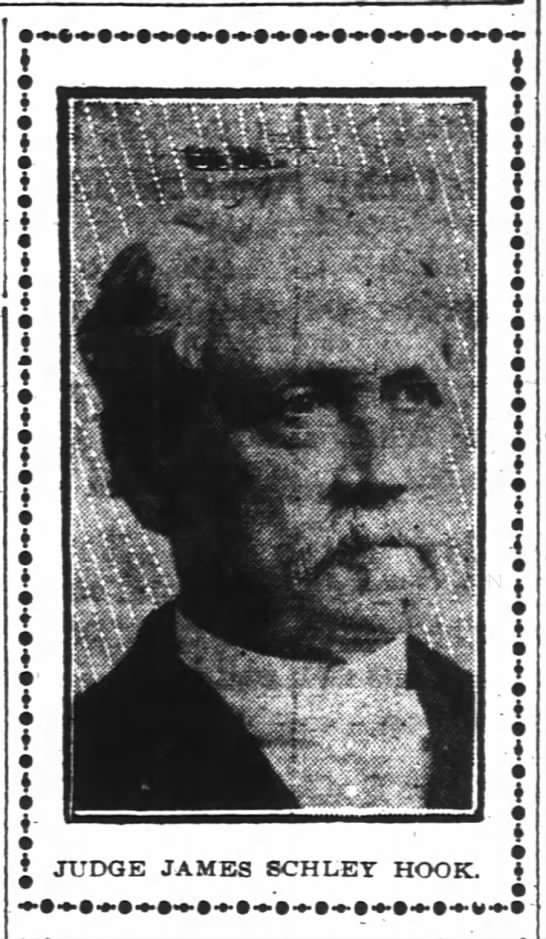
Photographic portrait as printed with his obituary in The Atlanta Constitution

Judge Hook is a Southern gentleman of the old school and a Christian man of highest integrity, he has been one of the leaders of the bar in Georgia, and a learned and able jurist, presiding with grace and power. He met in the court-room Robert Toombs, Ben Hill, the Stephenses and all the leading lawyers of Georgia, and his name is linked with some of the most celebrated trials in the state. He is one of the most eloquent and forcible orators of the state, wielding great influence over juries, and a strong and chaste writer. He has made powerful and classic deliverances in the court-room, on the political hustings, and on the college platform.

In a series of letters signed "Law and Order", which were widely copied in and out of the state, and highly praised, he took issue with Alexander H. Stephens for opposing Horace Greeley as the Democratic nominee for president. In The Augusta Chronicle, he printed over his own name able letters showing the distress of the farmers, declaring they were growing poorer year by year, and opposing the National Bank system as tending to enslave labor. He was an earnest student of political economy and finance and believed the National Banking system to be the greatest curse ever inflicted on the United States. He declined the Greenback nomination for Congress in the hope that the Democratic Party would correct the evils under which the country labored.

His literary taste was shown in his ornate addresses before colleges. His oration on the "Bible and Republicanism" at Oglethorpe University and on "Woman and Truth" to the graduates of Wesleyan Female College, are called "magnificent efforts of eloquence and culture" by the Cyclopaedia.

== Personal life ==
He married, in 1851, Emily J. Harris, who died in 1881; and in 1885, Mrs. Lulie C. Mays. His eldest son, Edward B. Hook, was editor of The Augusta Chronicle, and a capable newspaper man of good reputation in Georgia.

== Sources ==
- Garrett, Franklin M. (1969). Atlanta and Environs: A Chronicle of Its People and Events, 1820s–1870s. Vol. 1. Atlanta, GA: University of Georgia Press. p. 852.
- Hook, James William (1925). James Hook and Virginia Eller: A Family History and Genealogy. New Haven, CT: The Tuttle, Morehouse & Taylor Company. pp. 53–57.
- ——— (1952). Capt. James Hook of Greene County, Pennsylvania. Ann Arbor, MI: Edwards Brothers, Inc. pp. 36–40.
- "Judge J. S. Hook Called to Beyond". The Atlanta Constitution. Friday, September 20, 1907. p. 7.

Attribution:
