= Nancy Harts =

Female Confederate militia units of the American Civil War

The Nancy Harts were various troops of female militia raised in the Southern United States during the American Civil War. Named in honor of Nancy Hart, all the troops eventually were dissolved, except for the one from LaGrange, Georgia. Chiefly organized by Nancy Hill Morgan and Mary Alford Heard, around 30 women joined the Nancy Harts which were more formally called the Nancy Hart Rifles. Captained by Morgan, the militia trained for battle, using William J. Hardee's Rifle and Light Infantry Tactics. Though they trained to fight, they never did, and served mainly as a nursing corps. The militia surrendered to Colonel Oscar H. LaGrange in 1865.
