= Robert C. Tyler =

Confederate Brigadier General

Robert Charles Tyler
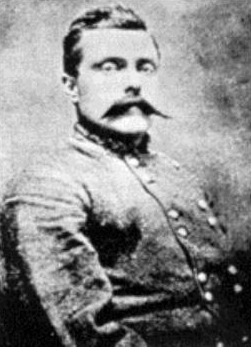
- Born: December 4, 1832; Hardwick, Massachusetts
- Died: April 16, 1865 (aged 32) near West Point, Georgia
- Burial place: Fort Tyler Cemetery; West Point, Georgia
- Military career
- Allegiance: Confederate States of America
- Branch: Confederate States Army
- Service years: 1861–1865
- Rank: 1st Lieutenant (Walker's Army); Brigadier General (CSA)
- Commands: Fort Tyler; Bate's/Tyler's Brigade; 15th-37th Consolidated Tennessee Infantry; 15th Tennessee Infantry Regiment
- Conflicts: William Walker's Campaign of 1856–57 American Civil War: Battle of Belmont; Battle of Shiloh; Siege of Corinth; Confederate Heartland Offensive; Battle of Stones River; Battle of Chickamauga; Battle of Missionary Ridge; Battle of West Point †

Robert Charles Tyler (December 4, 1832 – April 16, 1865) was a Confederate Brigadier General during the American Civil War. He was the last general killed in the conflict.

He commanded the 15th Tennessee Infantry at Belmont and Shiloh, and then led the 15th-37th Consolidated Tennessee Infantry into battle at Chickamauga. Commanding a brigade at Missionary Ridge, he lost a leg. He was killed at the Battle of West Point, Georgia, one of the last battles of the war, defending an earthworks named Fort Tyler after him.

He was one of a handful of Confederate generals born and raised in the North.

== Early life ==
Robert Charles Tyler was born Reuben Cutler Tyler, December 4, 1832, the son of Reuben and Elizabeth Billings Tyler of Hardwick, Massachusetts. The father was a farmer and deacon of the local Congregationalist church. He's living with his parents in Hardwick in 1850, but by 1852 he moved to Yolo County, California, being listed as a "farmer," born Massachusetts, on the 1852 California state census. By 1855 he's living in Sonoma County, California, and is being sued for debts. He served as a first lieutenant in William Walker's filibustering army and fought in Nicaragua during the Campaign of 1856–57. About this time he started being referred to as "R. Charles" or "Robert Charles" Tyler, perhaps in order to evade his California creditors. Briefly settling to Baltimore, he worked there as a clerk in 1859. Just prior to the Civil War moved to Memphis, Tennessee working as a clerk. In 1859 he helped organize the Knights of the Golden Circle, being chosen quartermaster general at the KGC's 1860 national convention. In 1860 KGC founder George W. Bickley helped "Reuben C. Tyler" of Baltimore, and other KGC officers, obtain passports, possibly in connection with another filibustering attempt.

Missing or conflicting sources make both his early life and his military career in the early civil war years unsure.

== Civil War ==
When the American Civil War erupted, Tyler joined the Confederate Army as a private in Company D of the 15th Tennessee Infantry Regiment, and was promoted to Quartermaster Sergeant the same date. Within early 1861 Tyler was promoted to the position of Regimental Quartermaster, and is said to have been Quartermaster-General on the staffs of Generals Benjamin F. Cheatham and Gideon Pillow with the rank of captain and later as major. Promoted to Lieutenant Colonel shortly before the Battle of Belmont as his predecessor resigned, Tyler commanded the regiment during the battle as Colonel Charles M. Carroll was absent. Tyler retained command of the regiment till the Battle of Shiloh. Losing three horses under him, he was wounded himself on April 7. His services were officially noted by Tyler's brigade commander, Brigadier Bushrod Johnson.

Stationed at Corinth the 15th Tennessee reorganized, and Tyler was elected to become Colonel of the regiment. Partially due to his wounds, by order of General Braxton Bragg he served as Provost-Marshal General of the Army of Tennessee during the Confederate Heartland Offensive. After the Battle of Stones River, the depleted 15th Tennessee was consolidated with the 37th Tennessee Infantry Regiment and Tyler was selected by General Bragg to command the 15th-37th Consolidated Tennessee Infantry Regiment, which he led into the Battle of Chickamauga. Capturing four guns on September 19, Tyler was slightly wounded in the assault on the next day.

When after the battle Brigadier William B. Bate was elevated to division command, Tyler took command of the brigade. Tyler then had command not only his own 15-37th Tennessee, but also the 10th, 20th and 30th Tennessee Regiments, as well as the 1st Tennessee Battalion, the 4th Georgia Battalion and the 37th Georgia Regiment. In the ensuing Chattanooga campaign Tyler's (Bate's) brigade was posted on Missionary Ridge, right in the center of the Confederate second line near Bragg's headquarters. During the Battle of Missionary Ridge the brigade initially held its position against Wagner's brigade, but was dislodged by the flanking attack of Hazen's brigade. Trying to rally his fleeing men Tyler was shot in the left leg and was carried from the field.

The wound eventually led to the amputation of his leg and bound him to use crutches for the rest of his life. For his physical recovery, he transferred into a hospital at West Point, Georgia, and was still there when he received a promotion to brigadier general on February 23, 1864. Though his brigade was renamed to Tyler's Brigade, he never commanded the unit in the field. Instead he stayed in Georgia and later in 1864 commanded a camp near Macon where dismounted cavalrymen, stragglers and shirkers were organized into infantry. When the area was evacuated in late 1864 Tyler returned to West Point as commander of Fort Tyler, a small square earthwork with two field guns and a large 32-pounder gun. He held the position during winter, guarding the railroad bridges over the Chattahoochee River with a small detachment of convalescent soldiers, invalids and militiamen.

=== Battle of West Point ===
On the morning of April 16, 1865, seven days after Robert E. Lee's surrender, one of the brigades of Wilson's Cavalry Corps, commanded by Colonel Oscar Hugh La Grange and accompanied by a battery of artillery, attacked Fort Tyler. The battle raged on through most of the day as the outnumbered Confederates under command of General Tyler attempted to hold their fort. Around noon, during a stalemate, Tyler looked out onto the battlefield and was shot by a sniper positioned in a nearby cottage – which Tyler had refused to burn earlier because he knew the owner and did not believe the person could afford the loss. Reputedly another soldier shot at the same time, splitting his crutches.

General Tyler is buried on the Fort Tyler Cemetery at West Point, like the other fallen defenders of Fort Tyler. He rests in a joint grave together with a longtime friend, Captain Celestino Gonzalez of the 1st Florida Infantry Regiment.

== See also ==
- List of American Civil War generals (Confederate)
