= 4th Wisconsin Infantry Regiment =

Union Army infantry regiment

- Flag of Wisconsin
- Active: July 2, 1861 – September 1, 1863
- Country: United States
- Allegiance: Union
- Branch: Infantry
- Size: Regiment
- Engagements: American Civil War: Siege of Port Hudson

Commanders
- Colonel: Halbert E. Paine
- Colonel: Sidney A. Bean
- Lt. Colonel: Frederick A. Boardman

The 4th Wisconsin Infantry Regiment was a volunteer infantry regiment that served in the Union Army during the American Civil War, primarily in the western theater. In September 1863, the regiment was mounted and converted to the 4th Wisconsin Cavalry Regiment.

== Service ==
The 4th Wisconsin was raised as an infantry regiment at Camp Utley in Racine and was mustered into Federal service on July 2, 1861.

It was first assigned to garrison duty in Maryland, then in February 1862 was transferred to Newport News, Virginia. It became part of the Army of the Gulf and was subsequently sent to New Orleans, Louisiana. During the following year, the 4th Wisconsin participated in several expeditions against Vicksburg, Mississippi, and Port Hudson, Louisiana. It saw action in the Siege of Port Hudson from May to July 1863.

On September 1, 1863, the regiment was reorganized as the 4th Wisconsin Cavalry Regiment, which it served as through the remainder of the war.

== Commanders ==
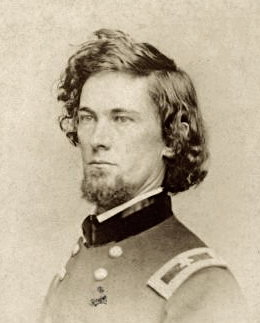
Halbert E. Paine

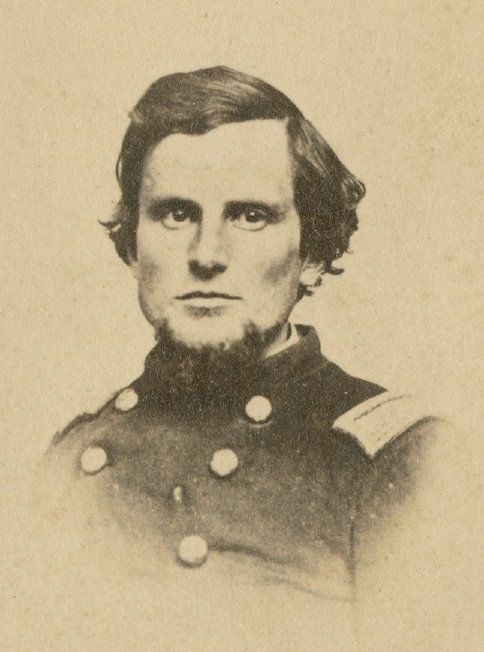
Sidney A. Bean

- Colonel Halbert E. Paine (May 27, 1861 – March 13, 1863) was promoted to brigadier general.
- Colonel Sidney Alfred Bean (March 17, 1863 – May 29, 1863) was killed in action at the Battle of Port Hudson.
- Colonel Frederick Augustus Boardman (June 3, 1863 – May 3, 1864) was killed in action at Comite River, Louisiana.
  - Colonel Joseph Bailey (June 1863) was designated colonel of the regiment by General Nathaniel P. Banks, but the promotion was deemed illegal. Bailey later served on Banks' staff, was promoted to brigadier general, and received an honorary brevet to major general.

== Total enlistments and casualties ==
The 4th Wisconsin Regiment initially mustered 1,058 men and later recruited an additional 994 men, for a total of 2,052 men during its service. The regiment lost 9 officers and 158 enlisted men killed in action or mortally wounds, plus another 2 officers and 113 enlisted men who died of disease, for a total of 282 fatalities.

4th Wisconsin Infantry, Company Organization
Company	Original Moniker	Primary Place of Recruitment	Captain(s)
A	Whitewater Light Infantry	Walworth, Racine, Monroe, Dane, Jefferson, Columbia, and Fond du Lac Counties	Charles E. Curtice (detailed); Henry W. Ross (converted)
B	Ripon Rifles	The city of Ripon, Waupaca County, Winnebago County, and Fond du Lac County	Oscar Hugh La Grange (transferred); George W. Carter (converted)
C	Sheboygan County Volunteers	Sheboygan County	Edmund B. Gray (resigned); Pascal Pauli (resigned); George W. Durgin Jr. (converted)
D	Columbia Rifles	Columbia, Sauk, Adams and Juneau counties	Joseph Bailey (promoted); Edwin R. Herren (converted)
E	Jefferson County Guards	Rock County, Walworth County, Jefferson, Dane, Waupaca, and Milwaukee Counties.	Webster Porter Moore (promoted); Charles D. Wooster (converted)
F	Geneva Independents	Walworth, Calumet, and Polk Counties	Daniel C. Roundy (resigned); Nelson F. Craigue (converted)
G	Hudson City Guards	City of Hudson and St. Croix County	Daniel W. White (resigned); James Keefe (converted)
H	Oconto River Drivers	Oconto, Milwaukee, Marinette, and Brown Counties	Joseph F. Loy (resigned); Erastus J. Peck (converted)
I	Monroe County Volunteers	Monroe, Dane, and Jackson Counties	John W. Lynn (KIA); Levi R. Blake (DOW); Daniel G. Jewett (converted)
K	Calumet Rifles	Calumet and Brown Counties	Harrison Carroll Hobart (transferred); Joseph B. Reynolds (converted)

== Notable people ==
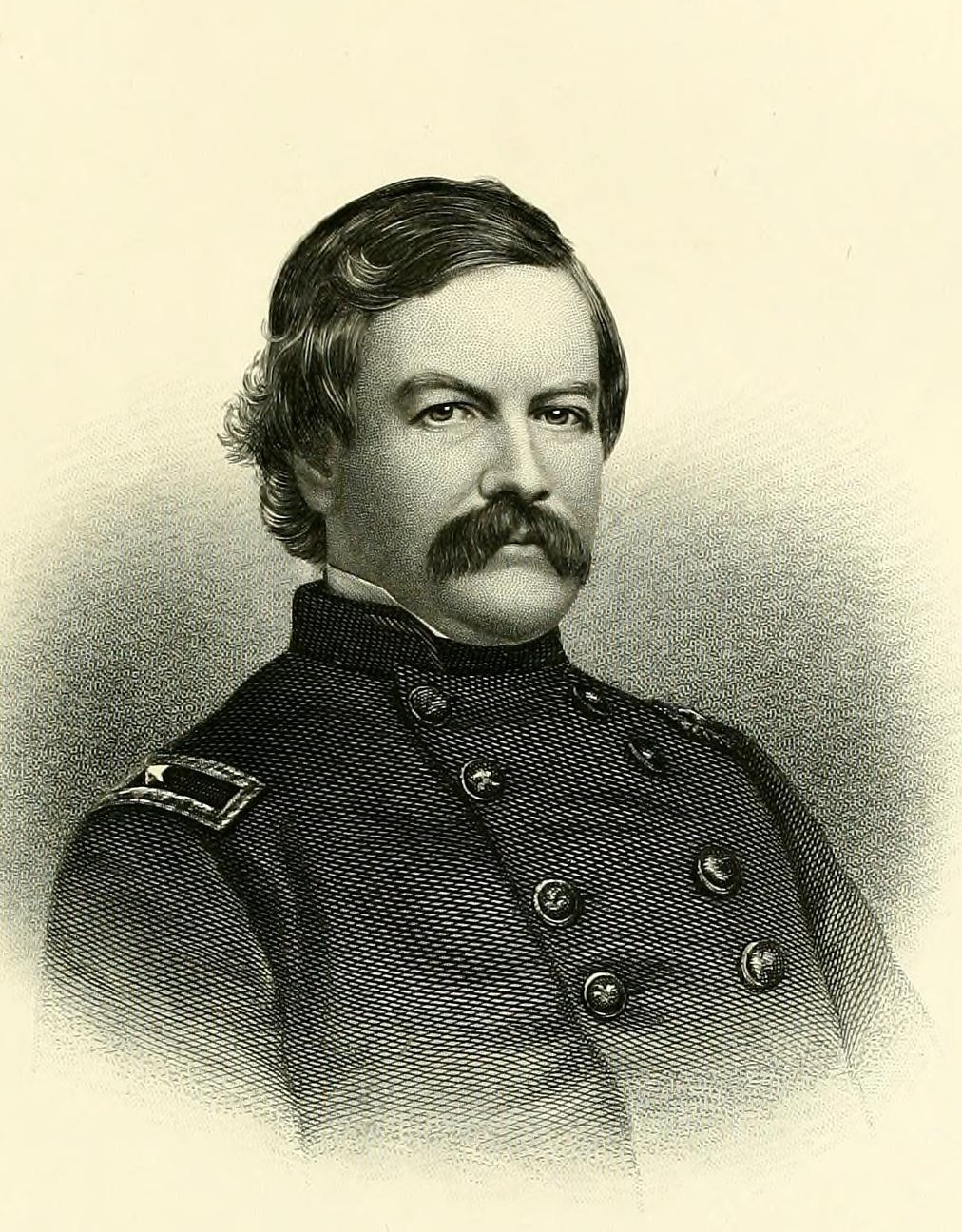
Harrison C. Hobart

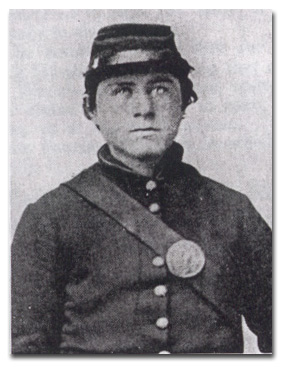
Knute Nelson
- A. Constantine Barry was chaplain of the regiment. Before the war he had served as Superintendent of Public Instruction of Wisconsin. He would later serve as a Wisconsin state legislator.
- William D. Hoard, musician, received a medical discharge but later returned to the service in the 1st New York Artillery Regiment. After the war, he was elected the 16th governor of Wisconsin.
- Harrison Carroll Hobart was captain of Co. K but left the regiment in July 1862 to join the 21st Wisconsin Infantry Regiment, where he was promoted to colonel and later received an honorary brevet to brigadier general. After the war he was an unsuccessful candidate for governor of Wisconsin in 1865. Earlier in life, he had been a Wisconsin state legislator and had been speaker of the Wisconsin State Assembly.
- Oscar Hugh La Grange was briefly captain of Co. B, but was transferred to the 1st Wisconsin Cavalry Regiment in November 1861, where he rose to become colonel and received an honorary brevet to brigadier general.
- Knute Nelson was a corporal in Co. B and was wounded and captured at the Siege of Port Hudson. Later in life, he became the 12th governor of Minnesota and a four-term United States Senator.
- Otto Puhlman was a sergeant in Co. C, but transferred to the 19th Wisconsin Infantry Regiment in February 1862, and eventually rose to the rank of captain. After the war, he served in the Wisconsin Legislature and was the first mayor of Plymouth, Wisconsin.
- Wilbur M. Root was enlisted in Co. C. After the war became a Wisconsin state legislator, police chief, and sheriff.
- Joseph F. Loy - Loy was a lawyer in Green Bay, Wisconsin. In 1853 and 1854, Loy served in the Wisconsin State Senate.

== See also ==
- List of Wisconsin Civil War units
- Wisconsin in the American Civil War
- 4th Wisconsin Infantry Regiment (1898)
