= Wilbur M. Root =

American politician

Wilbur Marsellus Root (December 27, 1842 – March 3, 1916) was an American businessman, newspaper editor, and politician.

Born in Cleveland, Ohio, Root settled in Plymouth, Sheboygan County, Wisconsin, in 1849. Root served in the 4th Wisconsin Infantry Regiment during the American Civil War. In 1871, Root moved to Sheboygan, Wisconsin. He was a marble and monument dealer and was editor of the Sheboygan Press newspaper from 1895 to 1904. Root served as justice of the peace and was active in the Democratic Party. In 1871, 1872, 1883, and 1884, Root served as sheriff for Sheboygan County. He served as chief of police for the city of Sheboygan from 1887 to 1889. In 1889 and 1890, Root served on the Sheboygan Common Council. In 1879, 1880, 1882, and 1887, Root served in the Wisconsin State Assembly. Then, from 1890 to 1893, Root served as Wisconsin State Insurance Commissioner. Root died at his home in Sheboygan, Wisconsin from a long illness.
