= William Henry Young (politician) =

American politician

William Henry Young was an American politician. He was a member of the Wisconsin State Assembly.

== Biography ==
Young was born on August 11, 1845, in Woodville, Mississippi. He would move to St. Helena Parish, Louisiana in 1852. During the American Civil War, Young served with the 4th Wisconsin Volunteer Cavalry Regiment of the Union Army. Originally an enlisted man, he achieved the rank of first lieutenant.

== Political career ==
Young was a member of the Assembly in 1885. Additionally, he was an alderman and Mayor of Oconto, Wisconsin. He was a Republican.
