= John T. Croxton =

Union Army general

John Thomas Croxton
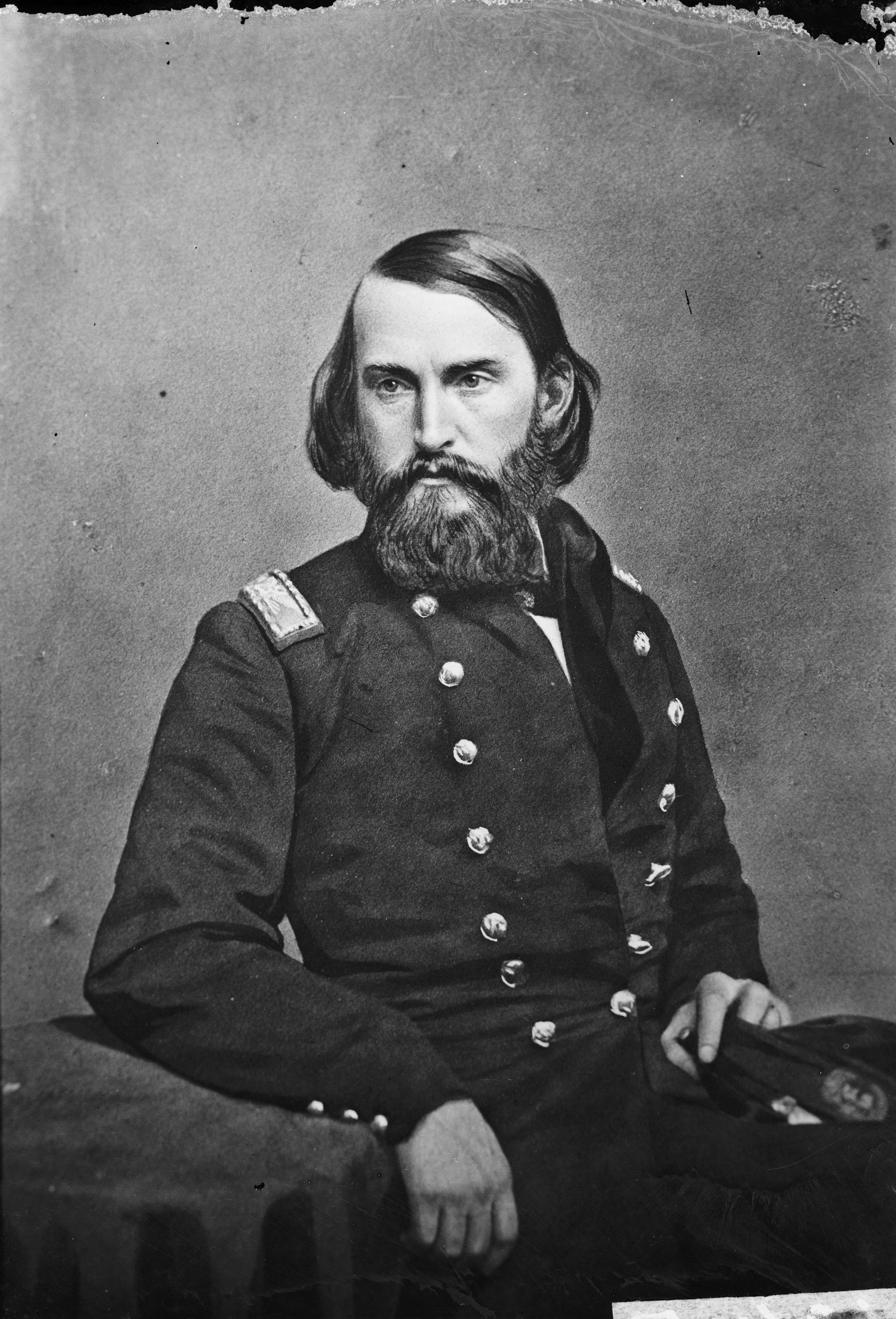
- John T. Croxton

United States Ambassador to Bolivia
- In office April 9, 1873 – April 16, 1874
- President: Ulysses S. Grant
- Preceded by: Leopold Markbreit
- Succeeded by: Robert M. Reynolds

Personal details
- Born: November 20, 1836 Paris, Kentucky, US
- Died: April 16, 1874 (aged 37) La Paz, Bolivia
- Resting place: Paris Cemetery, Paris, Kentucky

Military service
- Allegiance: United States
- Branch/service: United States Army; Union Army
- Years of service: 1861–1865
- Rank: Brigadier General; Brevet Major General
- Commands: 4th Kentucky Infantry Regiment; 2nd Brigade, 3rd Division, XIV Corps; 1st Brigade, 1st Division, Cavalry Corps, Army of the Cumberland
- Battles/wars: American Civil War

John Thomas Croxton (November 20, 1836 – April 16, 1874) was an attorney, a general in the United States Army during the American Civil War, and a Reconstruction era U.S. diplomat.

== Early life and career ==
Croxton was born near Paris, Kentucky, in rural Bourbon County. He was the oldest son among the twelve children of a Virginia-born wealthy planter and slave owner named Henry Croxton. In 1857, he graduated with honors from Yale University, where he was a member of the Skull and Bones secret society. He subsequently studied law under prominent attorney James Robinson and eventually joined the Freemasonry movement.

Croxton was admitted to the bar and taught law courses at a school in Mississippi in 1858. He returned to Kentucky the following year and established a profitable law practice in Paris, as well as owning a small farm outside of town. He married Caroline Rogers (1833–1882) and raised three daughters. His ardent support for the emancipation of slaves alienated him from much of his family.

== Civil War ==
In October 1861, as the Civil War escalated, President Abraham Lincoln appointed Croxton as the lieutenant colonel of the 4th Kentucky Mounted Infantry. He saw his first significant fighting in the Battle of Mill Springs. He later rose to its colonel in early 1862, and fought at Perryville. On September 19, 1863, his infantry brigade tangled with Confederate cavalry under Nathan Bedford Forrest, touching off the Battle of Chickamauga. Croxton was wounded during the fighting. He suffered a leg wound at the Battle of Nashville.

In 1864, he was promoted to brigadier general at the age of 27, leading a cavalry brigade in the Army of the Cumberland during the Atlanta campaign. His brigade was located in Florence, Alabama on November 1, when Confederate General John Bell Hood crossed the Tennessee River there to start Hood's Franklin-Nashville Campaign. From that point to Nashville and back to the Tennessee River, his brigade was engaged almost every day with the enemy. His cavalry was active in Alabama during the final months of the war. On April 4, 1865, his force of 1,500 men seized Tuscaloosa, strengthening the Union army's grip on central Alabama and eliminating one of the Confederacy's last major supply and munitions centers. In the process, they burned most of the University of Alabama's buildings, as well as much of the town's industry and warehouses. On April 23, 1865, Croxton's troops fought the Battle of Munford near Talladega, Alabama, defeating several hundred Confederate troops under General Benjamin Jefferson Hill. This is said to have been the last battle of the Civil War, east of the Mississippi.

== Reconstruction era career ==
In the omnibus promotions following the cessation of hostilities, Croxton was brevetted as a major general. He was then appointed to command the District of Southwest Georgia as provincial governor until he resigned on December 26, 1865.

After his resignation from the army, Croxton returned to his Kentucky law practice and became a staunch supporter of the Republican Party. In 1872, he was appointed by President Ulysses S. Grant as the U.S. Minister to Bolivia and moved his family to La Paz. He died there in April 1874, suffering from consumption.

== See also ==
- List of American Civil War generals (Union)
- List of ambassadors of the United States to Bolivia
