= Joseph F. Loy =

American politician

Joseph F. Loy (1824 – January 29, 1875) was a lawyer and politician.

Born in Somerset County, Pennsylvania, Loy went to school in Pennsylvania. He studied law and was admitted to the Pennsylvania bar. In 1850, Loy moved to De Pere, Wisconsin and then to Green Bay, Wisconsin where he practiced law. In 1853 and 1854, Loy served in the Wisconsin State Senate. During the American Civil War, Loy served in the 4th Wisconsin Infantry Regiment and was commissioned a captain.
