= 4th Wisconsin Cavalry Regiment =

Union Army cavalry regiment

- Flag of Wisconsin
- Active: August 22, 1863 – May 2, 1866
- Country: United States
- Allegiance: Union
- Branch: Cavalry
- Size: Regiment 2,045 (Total Enrollment)
- Engagements: American Civil War: Mobile Campaign

Commanders
- Colonel: Frederick A. Boardman
- Colonel: Joseph Bailey
- Lt. Colonel: Nelson F. Craigue

The 4th Wisconsin Cavalry Regiment was a volunteer cavalry regiment that served in the Union Army during the American Civil War. Earlier in the war, it had been organized as the 4th Wisconsin Infantry Regiment.

== Service ==
The 4th Wisconsin Cavalry was originally organized as the 4th Wisconsin Infantry Regiment at Racine, Wisconsin, on July 2, 1861. The regiment was redesignated the 4th Wisconsin Cavalry Regiment on August 22, 1863.

The regiment participated in picket and guard duties and was engaged in several skirmishes. In May, the regiment moved to Port Hudson to take part in the Siege of Port Hudson. From there, they took part in the first assault, reaching the ditches that surrounded the fortifications. The regiment later took part in the second assault on June 14, where they lost 140 out of their 220 engaged.

On June 25, the regiment moved to Baton Rouge and was engaged in picket and foraging duties, and occasionally sent to disperse small groups of cavalry and guerrillas. On November 27, 1864, the regiment was attached to the Cavalry force to prevent the enemy from advancing on General William T. Sherman's Army. In April 1865, after the surrender of Mobile, the regiment was sent on a 70-day expedition through Georgia, Alabama, and Mississippi.

After the war, the regiment was transferred to Texas near the Rio Grande River in July, and the companies of this regiment were detached to conduct guard and patrol duties in various points along the Rio Grande until May, 1866.

The regiment mustered out of Federal service at Brownsville, Texas, on May 2, 1866, and disbanded at Madison, Wisconsin, on June 19, 1866.

== Total strength and casualties ==
The 4th Wisconsin Cavalry initially recruited 1,047 officers and men. An additional 998 men were recruited as replacements, for a total of 2,045 men.

The regiment suffered 11 officers and 106 enlisted men killed or died from wounds in action, and 3 officers and 311 enlisted men who died of disease, for a total of 431 fatalities.

== Commanders ==
- Colonel Frederick A. Boardman (August 22, 1863 – May 3, 1864) was killed in action at Comite River, Louisiana. He had begun the war as major of the 4th Wisconsin Infantry Regiment and was promoted to Colonel after the death of Colonel Sidney Bean.
- Colonel Joseph Bailey (May 3, 1864 – November 10, 1864) was promoted to brigadier general. Earlier in the war, he had served as captain of Co. D in the 4th Wisconsin Infantry, and was later major and lieutenant colonel of the regiment.
- Lt. Colonel Nelson F. Craigue (June 1864 – May 28, 1866) mustered out with the regiment. He was designated for promotion to colonel, but was never mustered at that rank.

== Notable people ==
- John W. Gunning was chief bugler of the regiment. After the war he became a Wisconsin state legislator.
- Warren P. Knowles I, the grandfather of Warren P. Knowles III, was enlisted in Co. G and rose to the rank of captain.
- George Wilbur Peck was enlisted in Co. L and later commissioned 2nd lieutenant. After the war, he was elected the 29th mayor of Milwaukee and the 17th Governor of Wisconsin.
- Joseph B. Reynolds was captain of Co. K. After the war he became a Wisconsin state legislator.
- Arthur B. Richards, son of Daniel H. Richards, was enlisted in Co. L and died of disease at Baton Rouge.
- William Henry Young was enlisted in Co. H and was wounded at Port Hudson. He was designated for commission as 1st lieutenant but was never mustered at that rank. After the war he became a Wisconsin state legislator.

== See also ==
- List of Wisconsin Civil War units
- Wisconsin in the American Civil War
