= Edward Daniels =

American geologist (1828–1916)

Edward Dwight Daniels
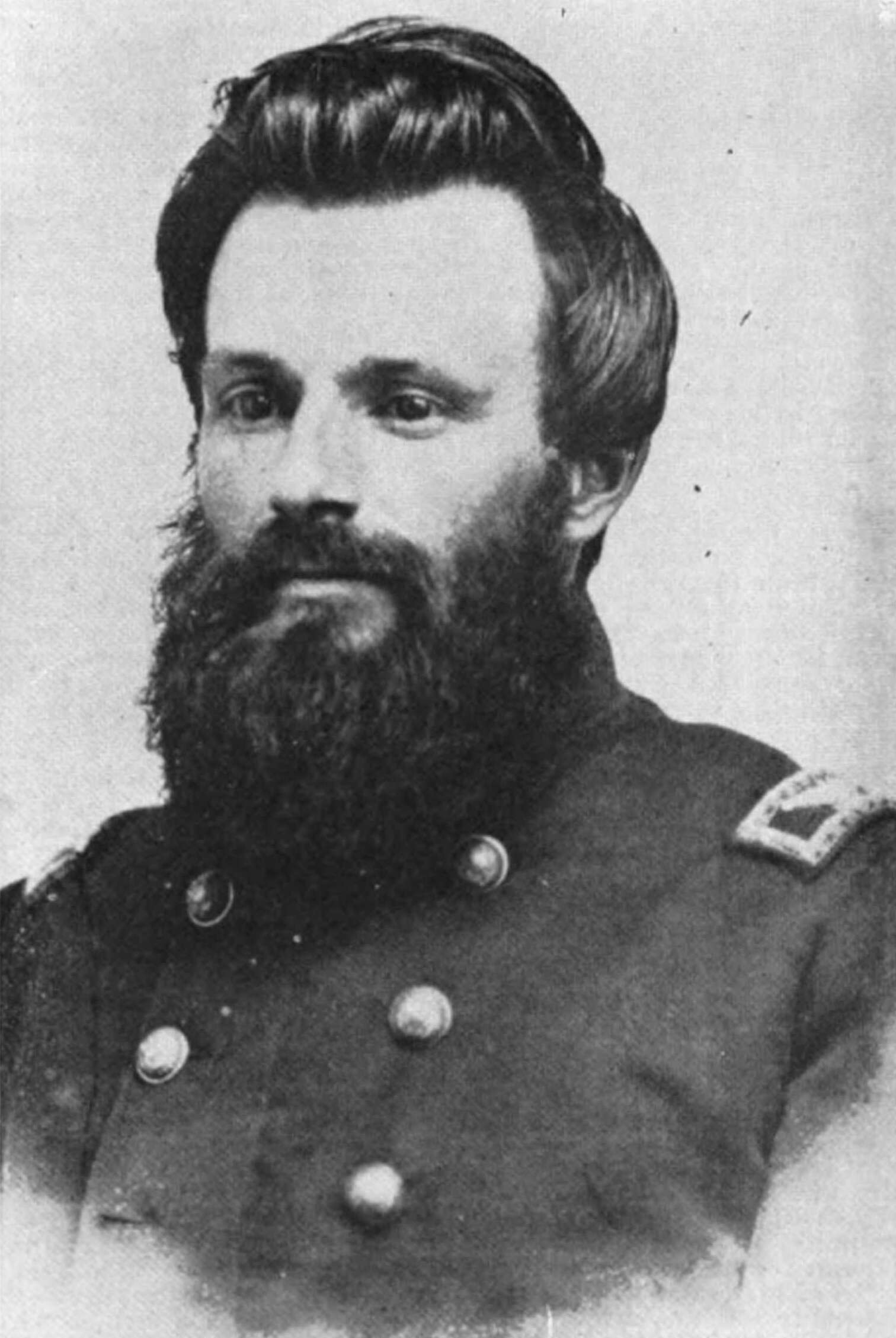
- Born: January 19, 1828; Cambridge, Massachusetts, U.S.
- Died: April 19, 1916 (aged 88); Fairfax County, Virginia, U.S.
- Occupations: Geologist, academic, abolitionist
- Spouse(s): Ione Gove (1859 - 1899, her death); Julia E. Rennie (1901 - 1916, his death)
- Children: 3, 1 of which died in infancy (with Ione)

Edward Dwight Daniels (1828–1916) was a geologist, abolitionist, and Civil War soldier. Born in Boston, Massachusetts, he moved to Wisconsin at age 21 to pursue a career as a geologist and academic. He became the first state geologist of Wisconsin in 1853. Daniels taught at Ripon College and Carroll College.

Daniels was a fervent abolitionist who became involved in the escape of fugitive slave Joshua Glover in 1854, as well as the plot to free abolitionist activist Sherman Booth from federal prison in 1860. He was a part of the ill-fated "Free-Stater" expedition led by Jim Lane into Kansas in 1856, part of the Bleeding Kansas events.

Daniels was quick to respond to the opening of hostilities between the states, organizing the 1st Wisconsin Volunteer Cavalry Regiment in 1861. He served as the commanding officer of this unit from 1861 to 1863. The 1st Wisconsin was initially stationed in Missouri, but Daniels led successful raids into Arkansas. However, his actions were unauthorized and called into question by his commanders, leading to Daniels' resignation in 1863.

In 1868 Daniels and his wife, Ione Gove Daniels, purchased the Gunston Hall estate in Virginia from descendants of George Mason. Daniels used the land to attempt a number of utopian and scientific farming schemes, including a school for freedmen. During the 1880s, he and his wife were involved in Albert Kimsey Owen's utopian socialist Topolobampo colony in Sinaloa, Mexico, though it is unclear whether they actually attempted to settle there.

During his time in Virginia, Daniels was actively involved in the politics of the Reconstruction South. He edited a Republican Richmond journal, The Daily State Journal, and ran unsuccessfully for a seat in the United States House of Representatives against former Confederate officer Eppa Hunton.

Edward Daniels died in Virginia in May 1916.

== Sources ==
- 1st Wisconsin Cavalry Civil War Re-enactors Website
- Edward Daniels Papers 1834–1900, (microfilm), Wisconsin Historical Society Library
- Robinson, Bertha Louisa, "Pilgrimages to American Landmarks - Gunston Hall", Journal of American History, 1910.
- Obituary of Edward Daniels, The Daily Northwestern, Oshkosh, Wisconsin, May 12, 1916.
