= Battle of West Point =

1865 battle of the American Civil War

- Part of the American Civil War
Date	April 16, 1865 (161 years ago)
Location	Harris and Troup counties, Georgia 32°52′54″N 85°11′14″W
Result	Union victory

Belligerents
United States (Union)	Confederate States

Commanders and leaders
(United States) Oscar Hugh La Grange	(Confederate States of America) Robert C. Tyler †

Strength
Cavalry Brigade (3,750 men, 4 cannons)	120–265 men 3 cannons

Casualties and losses
7 killed 29 wounded	19 killed 28 wounded

The Battle of West Point was fought on April 16, 1865, in Harris and Troup counties, Georgia, during the American Civil War. It was part of the Union campaign through Alabama and Georgia, known as Wilson's Raid, in the final full month of the Civil War.

The rail junction of West Point was one of the two Chattahoochee River crossings, which General James H. Wilson planned to destroy after capturing Montgomery, Alabama. Dividing his army, he detailed Colonel Oscar Hugh La Grange to attack West Point, while he himself moved downriver to instigate the Battle of Columbus, to take that important Confederate manufacturing center.

West Point was fortified by the earthwork of Fort Tyler, commanded by Confederate Brig. Gen. Robert C. Tyler, for whom it was named. Union artillery and dismounted cavalry, armed with Spencer repeater-carbines, soon forced the garrison to surrender, Tyler being shot dead by a sniper, and becoming the last Confederate General killed. On hearing of the victory at Columbus, Union troops were free to burn the bridge and the railroad stock. It was one of the last battles of the war.

== Prelude ==
After defeating Lt. Gen. Nathan Bedford Forrest's defenders at the Battle of Selma on April 2, 1865, and capturing Montgomery, Alabama, on April 12, U.S. Brig. Gen. Wilson turned his raiders' attentions toward the Chattahoochee River to the east. He telegraphed Maj. Gen. George H. Thomas:

If I can now destroy arsenals and supplies at Columbus and divide their army in the southwest, they must disintegrate for lack of munitions. There is no force to resist me, and I see no reasonable ground for fearing failures. My command is in magnificent condition.

The river was swollen by rains, so capturing a bridge would be required to make swift progress. Wilson determined that either one of two locations with bridges would suit this purpose: the one at West Point or the more heavily defended one at Columbus. The two towns were only 35 miles apart and Wilson divided his force to attack both, in order to increase the chances of one being taken intact. Colonel Oscar Hugh La Grange's brigade was detailed to attack West Point.

West Point did not have mills or foundries, but it was a critical rail center. As the connecting point for two railroads of different gauges, West Point had an extensive rail yard with many locomotives and rail cars.

The railway bridges were commanded by Fort Tyler, a 35-yard square earthwork upon a hill on the Alabama side of the river. It had walls four-and-a-half feet high, surrounded by a ditch six to ten feet deep and seven to twelve feet across. The fort was equipped with a 32-pounder siege gun and two 12-pounder field pieces.

== Battle ==
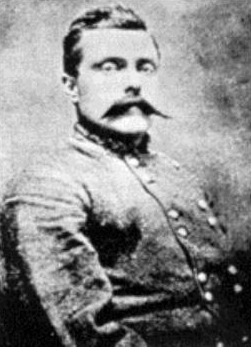
Brigadier General Robert Tyler, the last Confederate general to be killed in action

On the morning of April 16, La Grange's brigade approached West Point. The brigade consisted of the 2nd and 4th Indiana Cavalry, the 1st Wisconsin Cavalry, the 7th Kentucky Cavalry, and the 18th Indiana Battery of light artillery. The cavalry troopers were armed primarily with Spencer carbines.

Awaiting them at Fort Tyler was a small group of Confederates, somewhere between 120 and 265 men, under the command of Brig. Gen. Robert C. Tyler. In addition to the three cannon of the fort, the convalescents and militia were armed with smoothbore muskets.

Skirmishing began at 10 a.m., as the fort's pickets were driven in. The Federal battery set up half a mile away on Ward's Hill and began shelling the redoubt while cavalrymen dismounted to serve as skirmishers and invest the fort. Shelling continued until 1:30 p.m. when La Grange arrived with the remainder of the brigade. The dismounted cavalry pressed the fort and exchanged fire with the defenders, closing within 50 yards and sniping at the defending artillerists. The Federals also removed long planks from nearby structures in preparation to span the ditch.

As the Federals sniped at the Confederate artillerists attempting to man their pieces, Col. La Grange hoped to use the distraction to secure his primary objective, the bridge span, before it could be burned by the rebels. He led the 4th Indiana Cavalry on a mad dash for the bridge. Seeing this, the defenders in the fort turned their cannon to halt the foray, but as the cavalry approached the bridge they soon exceeded the effective range of the cannon. An exploding shell from the 32-pounder did succeed in killing the colonel's horse, two pack animals and resulting in the colonel being stunned and sprawled on the ground. Charging across the bridge the riders encountered a gap where planks had been removed, but were able to spur their horses over and overcome the Confederate defenders on the east side of the Chattahoochee River. Here they dispersed a small defensive force that had incendiaries for burning the structure.

With the defenders pinned inside their fort, Federal artillery and sniper fire suppressed the counter fire of the defenders who lacked protection from headlogs. As a result, many of the Confederate killed and wounded suffered head wounds.

The garrison commander's attention was drawn to fire from nearby structures, which Tyler had been urged to burn before the engagement, but had spared because he did not believe the owners could withstand the loss. According to a participant Tyler bravely exposed himself to examine the battlefield and was quickly shot dead by a sniper who was operating from a nearby cottage. Shortly thereafter, his second-in-command, Captain Celestino Gonzalez was also killed and Col. James H. Fannin assumed command.

To end the stalemate the dismounted troopers crossed the ditch using their planks. Running low on ammunition, some defenders threw rocks and lit shells over the parapet. A cavalry bugle sounded a final charge as the Union soldiers stormed over the embankment, and the fort immediately surrendered.

== Aftermath ==
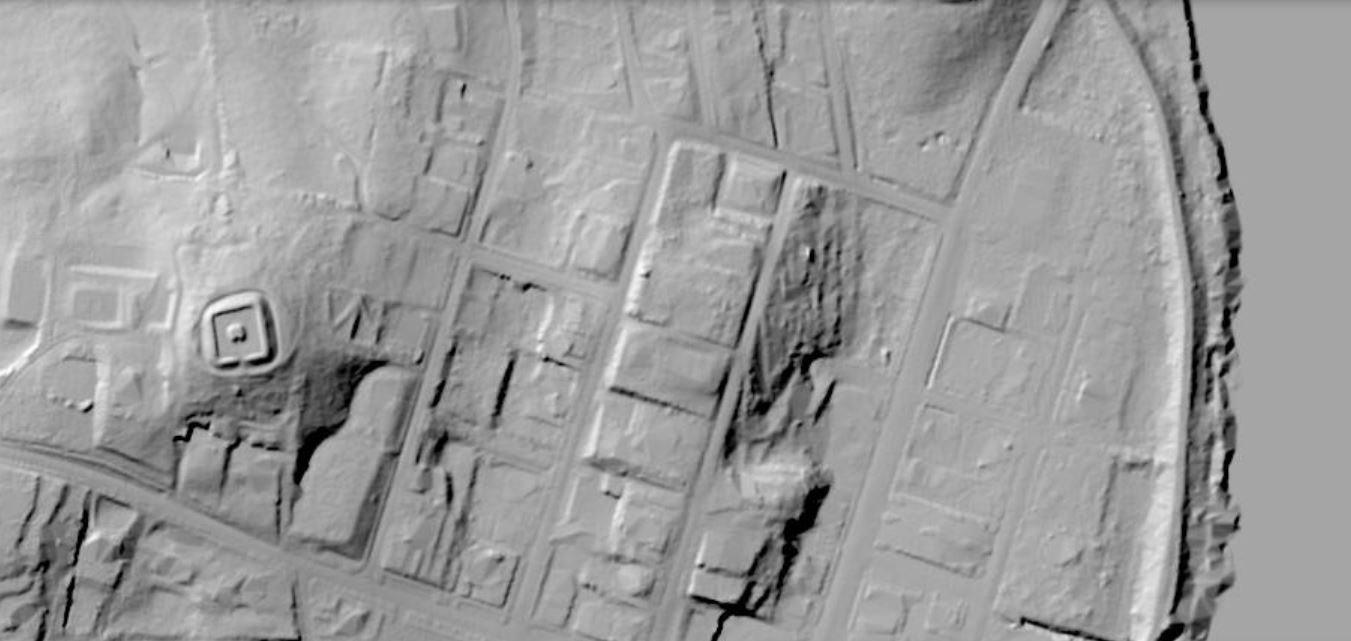
2017 LiDAR image of Fort Tyler, Georgia (center left) with the Chattahoochee River (extreme right).

Union casualties were seven men killed and twenty-nine wounded. The Confederates' losses were nineteen killed, twenty-eight wounded, and two hundred eighteen captured. The death of Brigadier General Tyler is noted as the last Confederate general to die in a battle. The Confederates who died were buried in what is now known as the Fort Tyler Cemetery in town on the east side of the river. It is believed but not confirmed that the Union dead were buried there as well. In addition, at least 50 other unknown Civil War soldiers are interred there.

The rolling stock of the Montgomery and West Point Railroad, along with commissary stores had been sent to West Point before Montgomery fell. Because of their narrow gauge, these trains were trapped. After the fort surrendered, Federal cavalry took control of the town of West Point and the vital bridges over the river. The raiders then proceeded to burn the entire rolling stock of the railroad, 19–20 locomotives and 340–350 cars. Before the cars were fired, some foodstuffs were removed and given to the mayor of West Point to feed the wounded of both sides as well as destitute citizens. The bridges were spared only briefly, as La Grange awaited word of the attack on Columbus to know if they would be needed.

== See also ==
- List of American Civil War battles
- List of battles 1801–1900
- Troop engagements of the American Civil War, 1865
