= Benjamin J. Hill =

American politician

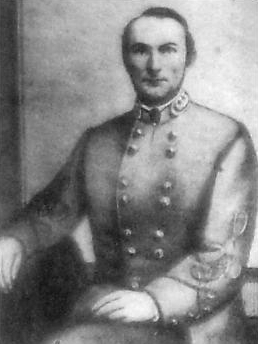
- Born: June 13, 1825; McMinnville, Tennessee, U.S.
- Died: January 5, 1880 (aged 54); McMinnville, Tennessee, U.S.
- Burial place: Old McMinnville City Cemetery, McMinnville, Tennessee, U.S.
- Military career
- Allegiance: Confederate States of America
- Branch: Confederate States Army
- Service years: 1861–1865
- Rank: Brigadier General, CSA
- Conflicts: American Civil War

Benjamin Jefferson Hill (June 13, 1825 – January 5, 1880) was a Confederate States Army brigadier general during the American Civil War. Before the war, he was a merchant and served in the Tennessee Senate. After the war, he was a merchant, lawyer and president of the McMinnville and Manchester Railroad.

== Early life ==
Benjamin Jefferson Hill was born on June 13, 1825, in McMinnville, Tennessee. He was a successful merchant and Tennessee state senator from 1855 until the beginning of the Civil War in 1861.

== American Civil War ==
Benjamin J. Hill began his Civil War service as colonel of the 5th Tennessee Volunteers in the Provisional Army of Tennessee. He resigned to enter Confederate States Army service as colonel of the 35th Tennessee Infantry Regiment by Tennessee Governor Isham Harris, which was the designation given to the 5th Tennessee Volunteers when they were mustered into Confederate service. Hill's regiment was assigned to the brigade of Brigadier General Patrick Cleburne and fought at the Battle of Shiloh. Hill served under Cleburne until Cleburne was killed at the Battle of Franklin on November 30, 1864. Hill also led the regiment at the Siege of Corinth.

Hill led his regiment in Bragg's Kentucky Campaign, in which they initiated the attack at the Battle of Richmond, and at the Battle of Stones River (Murfreesboro). Hill led Cleburne's brigade at Richmond and at the Battle of Perryville after Cleburne was wounded in those battles. Hill also was wounded at Richmond. Hill and his regiment also fought at the Battle of Chickamauga and in the Chattanooga campaign, including the unsuccessful defense of Missionary Ridge, where they were consolidated with the 48th Tennessee Infantry. Hill served as provost marshal of the Army of Tennessee between February 3, 1864, and August 23, 1864.

Hill was promoted to brigadier general (temporary) on November 30, 1864. Although his experience had been in the infantry, Hill was transferred to Brigadier General William Hicks Jackson's division of Lieutenant General Nathan Bedford Forrest's Cavalry Corps. He cooperated with Major General William Bate's division in destroying the railroad and blockhouses between Murfreesboro and Nashville near the end of the Franklin-Nashville Campaign. In the closing months of the war, he participated in Forrest's defense against Union Army Major General James H. Wilson's raid in Alabama and Georgia. Hill was paroled at Chattanooga, Tennessee on May 16, 1865.

== Aftermath ==
After the war, Hill returned to McMinnville where he again engaged in business as a merchant and practiced law. He also was president of the McMinnville and Manchester Railroad.

He was also the Mayor of McMinnville, TN. Col. Hill and Col. Savage took to the podium one day when there was a group crying out for the KKK. Both Col. Savage and Col. Hill denounced joining or supporting the KKK in the local middle Tennessee area around Warren County or any counties tangenting Warren County TN. Col. Hill spoke that the citizens and local County leadership work together for the benefit of all and did not need the KKK's help at all.

However, when 1878 arrived, so did a terrible cholera and yellow fever epidemic that affected all of Tennessee. It was so terrible that people were advised to stay away from crowds and not to assemble in large groups. This killed the hopes for a reunion of the 35th. By 1879, Hill's health was so poor that he could not organize a reunion. The reunion was to have included ex-President Jefferson Davis with an expected crowd of twenty thousand traveling to McMinnville for the festivities. Benjamin Jefferson Hill died at his home on January 5, 1880, only fifty-four years old. He was laid to rest under a large oak tree next to his baby daughter in the old City Cemetery in McMinnville. His devoted wife, Mary Vesta, lived until March 1, 1909, and became one of the last people to be interred in the old cemetery on High Street.

Benjamin Jefferson Hill died of yellow fever January 5, 1880, at McMinnville, Tennessee and is buried in Old City Cemetery, McMinnville. Benjamin Jefferson Hill died at his home on January 5, 1880, only fifty-four years old. He was laid to rest under a large oak tree next to his baby daughter in the old City Cemetery in McMinnville. His devoted wife, Mary Vesta, lived until March 1, 1909, and became one of the last people to be interred in the old cemetery on High Street, McMinnville TN.

== See also ==
- List of American Civil War generals (Confederate)
