= Oscar Hugh La Grange =

American lawyer, abolitionist, and Union army general of the American Civil War

Oscar H. La Grange
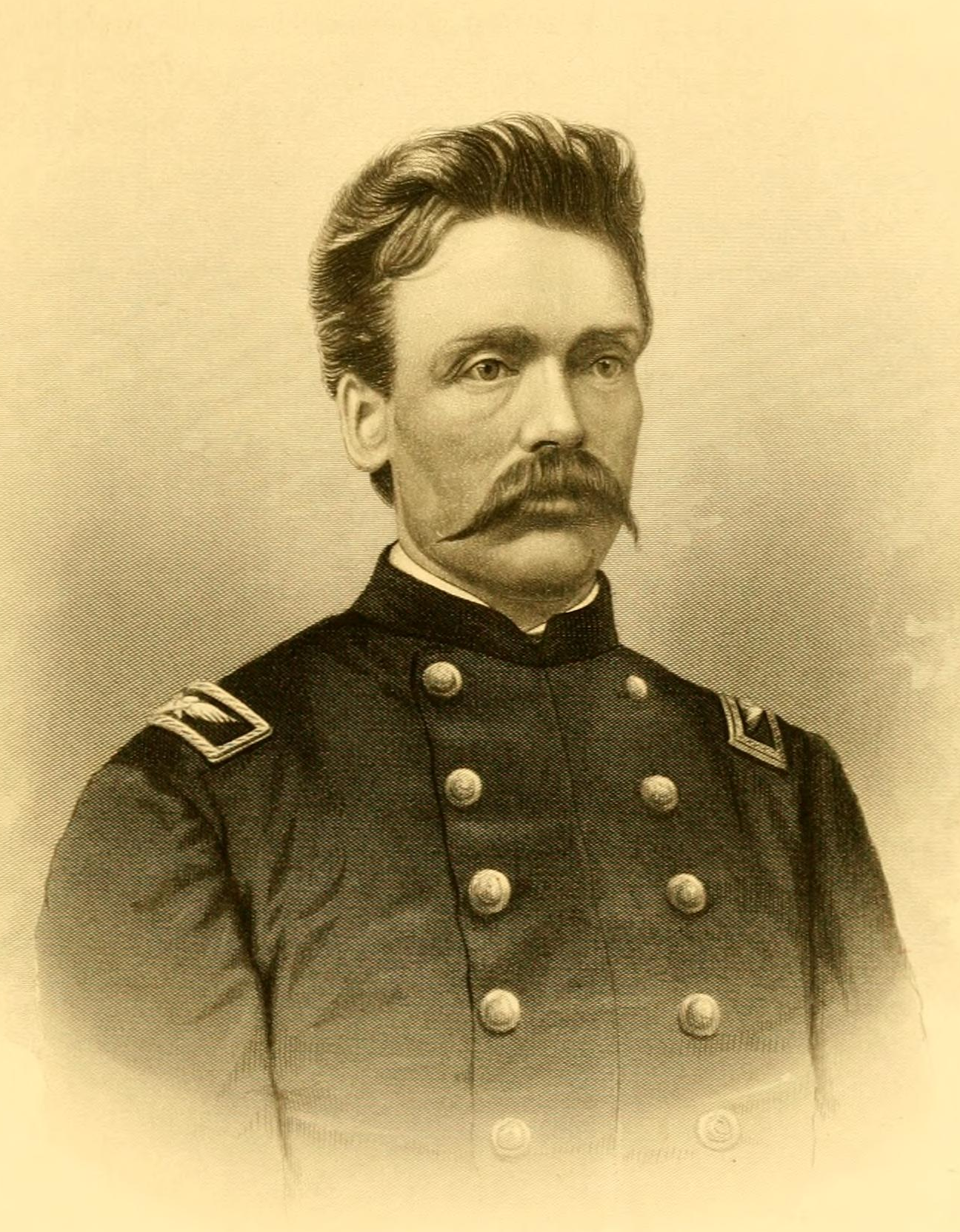
- Born: April 3, 1837; Fulton, New York, U.S.
- Died: January 5, 1915 (aged 77) New York, New York, U.S.
- Buried: Woodlawn Cemetery, Bronx, New York
- Allegiance: United States
- Branch: United States Volunteers; Union Army
- Service years: 1861–1865
- Rank: Colonel, USV; Brevet Brig. General, USV
- Commands: 1st Reg. Wis. Vol. Cavalry
- Conflicts: Bleeding Kansas; American Civil War; Battle of Chickamauga; Battle of Rocky Face Ridge (P.O.W.); Battle of West Point
- Spouse: Elizabeth (died 1880)
- Children: Hugh La Grange; (b. 1867; died 1908)

Oscar Hugh La Grange (April 3, 1837 – January 5, 1915) was an American lawyer and abolitionist activist. He served as a Union Army cavalry officer in the American Civil War, and received an honorary brevet to brigadier general.

== Early life and activism ==
Oscar Hugh La Grange was born on April 3, 1837, in Fulton, Oswego County, New York. In 1845, he and his family moved to Ripon, Wisconsin. He attended Ripon College and the University of Wisconsin in Madison.

As a teenager, La Grange became an active abolitionist, participating in the Bleeding Kansas conflicts. In 1860, he helped free abolitionist Sherman Booth from a Milwaukee jail and was on the run for several weeks hiding from law enforcement.

== Civil War service ==
After the outbreak of the American Civil War in 1861, La Grange joined the Army and was assigned to the 4th Wisconsin Infantry Regiment. Later that year, he transferred to the 1st Wisconsin Cavalry Regiment. In 1863, La Grange became a brigade commander in the Army of the Cumberland under the command of future U.S. Representative William Rosecrans. He later took part in the Battle of Chickamauga. In 1864, La Grange was serving in the Battle of Rocky Face Ridge when he was taken prisoner by Joseph Wheeler.

He was exchanged after three months. Returning to action, La Grange and his brigade played a vital role in the Battle of West Point. After this victory, LaGrange's troopers moved east toward LaGrange, Georgia, where they were met by a group of armed women who called themselves the Nancy Harts. After Colonel La Grange assured the women that he would not destroy private property, they backed down and disarmed.

La Grange was mustered out of the volunteers on July 19, 1865. On January 13, 1866, President Andrew Johnson nominated La Grange for appointment to the grade of brevet brigadier general of volunteers to rank from March 13, 1865, and the United States Senate confirmed the appointment on March 12, 1866.

== Postbellum career ==
La Grange moved to California shortly after the end of the war. He held several offices there, including a term as superintendent of the San Francisco Mint. He moved to New York in the 1890s and worked as a lawyer.

Oscar La Grange died of pneumonia on January 5, 1915, in New York City.
