= National Register of Historic Places listings in Muscogee County, Georgia =

Map highlighting Muscogee County in Georgia

This is a list of properties and districts in Muscogee County, Georgia that are listed on the National Register of Historic Places (NRHP).

This National Park Service list is complete through NPS recent listings posted January 16, 2026.

== Current listings ==
	Name on the Register	Image	Date listed	Location	City or town	Description
1	1238 Professional Building	1238 Professional Building	July 1, 2022 (#100007851)	1238 2nd Ave. 32°28′13″N 84°59′25″W	Columbus	
2	Adams Cotton Gin Building	Adams Cotton Gin Building	May 17, 1984 (#84001205)	6601 Hamilton Rd. 32°32′26″N 84°57′18″W	Columbus	Removed between 2008 and 2009
3	George O. Berry House	George O. Berry House	September 29, 1980 (#80001124)	912 2nd Ave. 32°27′48″N 84°59′24″W	Columbus	
4	Bibb City Historic District	Bibb City Historic District	February 24, 2010 (#10000037)	Roughly bounded by Chattahoochee River, Woodland Cir., 2nd Ave. and 35th St. 32°30′08″N 84°59′30″W	Bibb City	
5	Broad Street Methodist Episcopal Church South		December 2, 1980 (#80001125)	1323-1325 Broadway; 32°28′17″N 84°59′37″W	Columbus	Removed
6	Building at 1007 Broadway	Building at 1007 Broadway	September 29, 1980 (#80001130)	1007 Broadway; 32°27′55″N 84°59′37″W	Columbus	
7	Building at 1009 Broadway	Building at 1009 Broadway	September 29, 1980 (#80001131)	1009 Broadway; 32°27′55″N 84°59′37″W	Columbus	
8	Building at 1400 Third Avenue	Building at 1400 Third Avenue	September 29, 1980 (#80001132)	1400 Third Ave. 32°28′21″N 84°59′20″W	Columbus	
9	Building at 1519 3rd Avenue		December 2, 1980 (#80001126)	1519 3rd Ave. 32°28′30″N 84°59′21″W	Columbus	Removed
10	Building at 1531 3rd Avenue	Building at 1531 3rd Avenue	December 2, 1980 (#80001127)	1531 3rd Ave. 32°28′32″N 84°59′21″W	Columbus	
11	Building at 1612 3rd Avenue		December 2, 1980 (#80001128)	1612 3rd Ave. 32°28′35″N 84°59′20″W	Columbus	Removed
12	Building at 1617 Third Avenue	Building at 1617 Third Avenue	September 29, 1980 (#80001137)	1617 Third Ave. 32°28′37″N 84°59′21″W	Columbus	
13	Building at 1619 Third Avenue	Building at 1619 Third Avenue	September 29, 1980 (#80001138)	1619 Third Ave. 32°28′38″N 84°59′21″W	Columbus	
14	Building at 1625 Third Avenue	Building at 1625 Third Avenue	September 29, 1980 (#80001139)	1625 Third Ave. 32°28′38″N 84°59′21″W	Columbus	
15	Building at 215 Ninth Street	Building at 215 Ninth Street	September 29, 1980 (#80001140)	215 Ninth St. 32°27′47″N 84°59′22″W	Columbus	
16	Building at 221 Ninth Street	Building at 221 Ninth Street	September 29, 1980 (#80001141)	221 Ninth St. 32°27′47″N 84°59′22″W	Columbus	
17	Building at 303 11th St.		December 2, 1980 (#80001129)	303 11th St. 32°28′00″N 84°59′20″W	Columbus	Removed
18	Building at 920 Ninth Avenue	Building at 920 Ninth Avenue	September 29, 1980 (#80001142)	920 Ninth Ave. 32°27′45″N 84°58′48″W	Columbus	
19	Building at 921 Fifth Avenue		September 29, 1980 (#80001143)	921 Fifth Ave. 32°27′50″N 84°59′12″W	Columbus	
20	Building at 944 Second Avenue		September 29, 1980 (#80001144)	944 Second Ave. 32°27′52″N 84°59′25″W	Columbus	Removed
21	Bullard-Hart House	Bullard-Hart House	July 28, 1977 (#77000439)	1408 3rd Ave. 32°28′23″N 84°59′20″W	Columbus	
22	Bush-Philips Hardware Co.	Bush-Philips Hardware Co.	December 2, 1980 (#80001145)	1025 Broadway; 32°27′56″N 84°59′37″W	Columbus	
23	Thomas U. Butts House	Thomas U. Butts House	September 29, 1980 (#80001146)	1214 3rd Ave. 32°28′09″N 84°59′20″W	Columbus	
24	C.S.S. Muscogee and Chattahoochee (gunboats)	C.S.S. Muscogee and Chattahoochee (gunboats)	May 13, 1970 (#70000212)	4th St. W of U.S. 27; 32°26′49″N 84°58′46″W	Columbus	CSS Chattahoochee and CSS Muscogee
25	Walter Hurt Cargill House	Walter Hurt Cargill House	September 29, 1980 (#80001147)	1415 3rd Ave. 32°28′22″N 84°59′22″W	Columbus	
26	Carter and Bradley, Cotton Factors and Warehouseman	Carter and Bradley, Cotton Factors and Warehouseman	December 2, 1980 (#80001148)	1001-1037 Front Ave. 32°27′56″N 84°59′42″W	Columbus	
27	The Cedars	The Cedars	November 23, 1971 (#71000282)	2039 13th St. 32°28′20″N 84°57′48″W	Columbus	
28	Central of Georgia Railroad Terminal		December 2, 1980 (#80001150)	700 12th St. 32°28′07″N 84°59′01″W	Columbus	Removed
29	Central of Georgia Railroad Terminal	Central of Georgia Railroad Terminal	September 29, 1980 (#80001149)	1200 6th Ave. 32°28′07″N 84°59′01″W	Columbus	
30	Church of the Holy Family	Church of the Holy Family	September 29, 1980 (#80001152)	320 12th St. 32°28′06″N 84°59′18″W	Columbus	
31	Church Square	Church Square	December 2, 1980 (#80001151)	Roughly bounded by 2nd and 3rd Aves., 11th and 12th Sts. 32°28′03″N 84°59′23″W	Columbus	
32	City Fire Department	City Fire Department	September 29, 1980 (#80001153)	1338 and 1340 Broadway; 32°28′19″N 84°59′35″W	Columbus	
33	Claflin School	Claflin School	November 24, 2015 (#15000813)	1532 5th Ave. 32°28′33″N 84°59′07″W	Columbus	
34	Cole-Hatcher-Hampton Wholesale Grocers	Cole-Hatcher-Hampton Wholesale Grocers	September 29, 1980 (#80001154)	22 W. 10 St. 32°27′54″N 84°59′40″W	Columbus	
35	Colored Cemetery	Colored Cemetery	September 29, 1980 (#80001155)	10th Ave. 32°27′11″N 84°58′54″W	Columbus	Known as Porterdale Cemetery since the 1930s.
36	Columbian Lodge No. 7 Free and Accepted Masons	Columbian Lodge No. 7 Free and Accepted Masons	September 29, 1980 (#80001156)	101 12th St. 32°28′07″N 84°59′30″W	Columbus	
37	Columbus Coca-Cola Bottling Company	Columbus Coca-Cola Bottling Company	August 22, 2022 (#100008016)	1147 6th Ave. 32°28′04″N 84°59′06″W	Columbus	
38	Columbus High School	Columbus High School	September 29, 1980 (#80001157)	320 11th St. 32°27′59″N 84°59′17″W	Columbus	Columbus High School no longer occupies building
39	Columbus Historic District	Columbus Historic District	July 29, 1969 (#69000045)	Roughly bounded by 9th and 4th Sts., 4th Ave., and the Chattahoochee River; Boundary increase (listed October 21, 1988, refnum 88002048); 32°27′29″N 84°59′32″W	Columbus	
40	Columbus Historic Riverfront Industrial District	Columbus Historic Riverfront Industrial District	June 2, 1978 (#78000995)	Columbus River from 8th St. N. to 38th St. 32°29′08″N 84°59′31″W	Columbus	National Historic Landmark
41	Columbus Investment Company Building	Columbus Investment Company Building	September 29, 1980 (#80001158)	21 12th St. 32°28′07″N 84°59′32″W	Columbus	
42	Columbus Ironworks	Columbus Ironworks	July 29, 1969 (#69000046)	901 Front Ave. 32°27′47″N 84°59′43″W	Columbus	
43	Columbus Manufacturing Company	Columbus Manufacturing Company	July 10, 2007 (#07000699)	3201 1st Ave. 32°29′40″N 84°59′29″W	Columbus	
44	Columbus Stockade	Columbus Stockade	December 2, 1980 (#80001159)	622 10th St. 32°27′52″N 84°59′02″W	Columbus	
45	Wm. L. Cooke House	Wm. L. Cooke House	December 2, 1980 (#80001210)	1523 3rd Ave. 32°28′31″N 84°59′21″W	Columbus	
46	William H. Denson House	William H. Denson House	September 29, 1980 (#80001162)	930 5th Ave. 32°27′50″N 84°59′10″W	Columbus	Removed
47	Depot Business Buildings	Depot Business Buildings	September 29, 1980 (#80001163)	519, 521 and 523 E. 12th St. 32°28′08″N 84°59′06″W	Columbus	
48	Dinglewood	Dinglewood	February 1, 1972 (#72000389)	1429 Dinglewood St. 32°28′07″N 84°58′19″W	Columbus	An Italian Villa style house built in 1859
49	Dinglewood Historic District	Dinglewood Historic District	November 21, 2001 (#01001248)	Bounded by 13th and 16th Ave., 13th St., and Wynnton Rd. 32°28′08″N 84°58′14″W	Columbus	A historic district
50	Robert E. Dismukes Sr. House	Robert E. Dismukes Sr. House	January 8, 1979 (#79000736)	1617 Summit Dr. 32°28′34″N 84°57′46″W	Columbus	
51	Elisha P. Dismukes House		December 2, 1980 (#80001164)	1515 3rd Ave. 32°28′29″N 84°59′21″W	Columbus	Destroyed by fire
52	First African Baptist Church	First African Baptist Church	September 29, 1980 (#80001165)	901 5th Ave. 32°27′46″N 84°59′12″W	Columbus	
53	First African Baptist Church Parsonage	First African Baptist Church Parsonage	September 29, 1980 (#80001166)	911 5th Ave. 32°27′47″N 84°59′12″W	Columbus	
54	First National Bank	First National Bank	November 1, 1974 (#74000697)	1048 Broadway; 32°27′59″N 84°59′34″W	Columbus	
55	First Presbyterian Church	First Presbyterian Church	September 29, 1980 (#80001167)	1100 1st Ave. 32°28′00″N 84°59′30″W	Columbus	
56	John T. Fletcher House		September 29, 1980 (#80001168)	311 11th St. 32°28′00″N 84°59′19″W	Columbus	Removed
57	Fontaine Building	Fontaine Building	September 29, 1980 (#80001169)	13 W. 11th St. 32°27′59″N 84°59′39″W	Columbus	
58	Fortson House	Fortson House	June 3, 1999 (#99000657)	1100 Fortson Rd. 32°36′24″N 84°56′07″W	Fortson	
59	Frank Brothers	Frank Brothers	December 2, 1980 (#80001170)	18 W. 10th St. 32°27′54″N 84°59′39″W	Columbus	
60	Gann's Pharmacy		September 29, 1980 (#80001171)	1611 2nd Ave. 32°28′36″N 84°59′26″W	Columbus	Removed
61	Garrett-Bullock House	Garrett-Bullock House	September 29, 1980 (#80001172)	1402 2nd Ave. 32°28′21″N 84°59′25″W	Columbus	
62	Girard Colored Mission	Girard Colored Mission	September 29, 1980 (#80001173)	1002 6th Ave. 32°27′55″N 84°59′04″W	Columbus	
63	Goetchius-Wellborn House	Goetchius-Wellborn House	July 29, 1969 (#69000047)	405 Broadway; 32°27′14″N 84°59′38″W	Columbus	
64	Golden Brothers, Founders and Machinists	Golden Brothers, Founders and Machinists	September 29, 1980 (#80001174)	600 12th St. 32°28′04″N 84°59′05″W	Columbus	
65	Green Island Ranch		February 7, 1997 (#97000030)	6551 Green Island Dr. 32°32′31″N 85°00′11″W	Columbus	
66	Harrison-Gibson House		September 29, 1980 (#80001175)	309 11th St. 32°28′00″N 84°59′19″W	Columbus	Removed
67	High Uptown Historic District	High Uptown Historic District	July 7, 2004 (#04000669)	Roughly bounded by 2nd and 3rd Aves. between Railroad and 13th Sts. 32°28′25″N 84°59′22″W	Columbus	
68	Highland Hall		April 1, 1980 (#80004459)	1504 17th St. 32°28′42″N 84°58′12″W	Columbus	
69	Hillcrest-Wildwood Circle Historic District	Hillcrest-Wildwood Circle Historic District	July 14, 2002 (#02001748)	Roughly bounded by Wildwood Ave., 13th and 17th Sts., and Dixon Dr. 32°28′31″N 84°57′21″W	Columbus	
70	Hilton	Hilton	January 20, 1972 (#72000390)	2505 Macon Rd. 32°28′24″N 84°57′14″W	Columbus	
71	Hofflin & Greentree Building	Hofflin & Greentree Building	September 30, 1982 (#82002457)	1128-1130 Broadway; 32°28′04″N 84°59′35″W	Columbus	
72	Illges House	Illges House	June 19, 1973 (#73000634)	1428 2nd Ave. 32°28′25″N 84°59′24″W	Columbus	
73	John Paul Illges House	John Paul Illges House	September 29, 1980 (#80001178)	1425 3rd Ave. 32°28′24″N 84°59′21″W	Columbus	
74	Isaac Maund House		December 2, 1980 (#80001179)	1608 3rd Ave. 32°28′35″N 84°59′20″W	Columbus	Home no longer exists.
75	Joseph House	Joseph House	July 29, 1969 (#69000048)	828 Broadway; 32°27′44″N 84°59′35″W	Columbus	
76	Kress	Kress	September 29, 1980 (#80001180)	1117 Broadway; 32°28′02″N 84°59′37″W	Columbus	Building destroyed by fire in 1994. Facade was saved and remains standing.
77	Abraham Lafkowitz House		September 29, 1980 (#80001181)	934 5th Ave. 32°27′51″N 84°59′10″W	Columbus	Removed
78	Ledger-Enquirer Building	Ledger-Enquirer Building	December 2, 1980 (#80001183)	17 W. 12th St. 32°28′06″N 84°59′40″W	Columbus	
79	Lewis-Rothchild Building	Lewis-Rothchild Building	March 26, 2004 (#04000239)	1214 First Ave. 32°28′08″N 84°59′30″W	Columbus	
80	Liberty Theater	Liberty Theater	May 22, 1984 (#84001208)	821 8th Ave. 32°27′42″N 84°58′58″W	Columbus	
81	Lion House	Lion House	January 20, 1972 (#72000391)	1316 3rd Ave. 32°28′16″N 84°59′22″W	Columbus	
82	Sol Loeb Building-Garrett-Joy Building	Sol Loeb Building-Garrett-Joy Building	March 15, 2005 (#05000141)	900 Front Ave. and 901 Broadway; 32°27′46″N 84°59′37″W	Columbus	
83	McArdle House	McArdle House	September 29, 1980 (#80001184)	927 3rd Ave. 32°27′49″N 84°59′22″W	Columbus	
84	McGehee-Woodall House	McGehee-Woodall House	January 20, 1972 (#72000392)	1534 2nd Ave. 32°28′33″N 84°59′26″W	Columbus	Removed
85	Methodist Tabernacle	Methodist Tabernacle	September 29, 1980 (#80001186)	1605 3rd Ave. 32°28′34″N 84°59′22″W	Columbus	
86	Mott House	Mott House	December 3, 1974 (#74000698)	Front Ave. 32°28′22″N 84°59′39″W	Columbus	Destroyed by fire September 8, 2014.
87	Mott-Fox-Huguley House	Mott-Fox-Huguley House	March 12, 2012 (#12000093)	2027 6th Avenue; 32°29′03″N 84°59′09″W	Columbus	
88	Octagon House	Octagon House	July 29, 1969 (#69000049)	527 1st Ave. 32°27′23″N 84°59′32″W	Columbus	National Historic Landmark
89	Old City Cemetery	Old City Cemetery	September 29, 1980 (#80001188)	Linwood Blvd. 32°28′39″N 84°59′00″W	Columbus	
90	Old Dawson Place	Old Dawson Place	January 8, 1979 (#79000737)	1420 Wynnton Rd. 32°27′59″N 84°58′17″W	Columbus	
91	Peabody-Warner House	Peabody-Warner House	December 29, 1970 (#70000213)	1445 2nd Ave. 32°28′26″N 84°59′27″W	Columbus	
92	Peacock Woods-Dimon Circle Historic District	Peacock Woods-Dimon Circle Historic District	March 26, 2003 (#03000134)	Bounded by Cherokee and Forest Aves. and 13th and 17 Sts. 32°28′31″N 84°57′47″W	Columbus	
93	Pemberton House	Pemberton House	September 28, 1971 (#71000283)	11 7th St. 32°27′33″N 84°59′34″W	Columbus	
94	George Phillips House	George Phillips House	September 29, 1980 (#80001190)	1406 3rd Ave. 32°28′22″N 84°59′20″W	Columbus	
95	George Pond House	George Pond House	September 29, 1980 (#80001191)	922 2nd Ave. 32°27′49″N 84°59′26″W	Columbus	
96	Power and Baird, Wholesale Dry Goods and Notions	Power and Baird, Wholesale Dry Goods and Notions	December 2, 1980 (#80001193)	1107 Broadway; 32°28′01″N 84°59′37″W	Columbus	
97	Gertrude Ma Pridgett Rainey House	Gertrude Ma Pridgett Rainey House	November 18, 1992 (#92001530)	805 5th Ave. 32°27′41″N 84°59′12″W	Columbus	
98	Ralston Hotel	Ralston Hotel	March 17, 2025 (#100011529)	211 12th Street; 32°28′07″N 84°59′24″W	Columbus	
99	Rankin House	Rankin House	March 16, 1972 (#72000393)	1440 2nd Ave. 32°28′20″N 84°59′25″W	Columbus	
100	Rankin Square	Rankin Square	October 7, 1977 (#77000440)	Bounded by Broadway, 1st Ave., 10th and 11th Sts. 32°27′56″N 84°59′34″W	Columbus	
101	Reich Dry Goods Company	Reich Dry Goods Company	April 1, 2004 (#04000240)	14 W 11th St. 32°28′01″N 84°59′39″W	Columbus	
102	Ridgewood		April 2, 1980 (#80001215)	Jenkins Rd. 32°33′19″N 84°44′26″W	Upatoi	
103	John Spencer Roberts House	John Spencer Roberts House	September 29, 1980 (#80001195)	927 5th Ave. 32°27′50″N 84°59′12″W	Columbus	
104	Rose Hill School	Rose Hill School	March 30, 2022 (#100007533)	433 21st St. 32°29′04″N 84°59′10″W	Columbus	
105	Max Rosenberg House	Max Rosenberg House	September 29, 1980 (#80001196)	1011 3rd Ave. 32°27′54″N 84°59′22″W	Columbus	
106	David Rothschild's Wholesale Dry Goods	David Rothschild's Wholesale Dry Goods	September 29, 1980 (#80001197)	1029 Broadway; 32°27′57″N 84°59′37″W	Columbus	
107	David Rothschild House		September 29, 1980 (#80001198)	1220 3rd Ave. 32°28′10″N 84°59′20″W	Columbus	Removed
108	Secondary Industrial School	Secondary Industrial School	April 9, 1980 (#80001199)	1112 29th St. 32°29′21″N 84°58′41″W	Columbus	
109	Silver's Five and Dime Store-H.L. Green Co.	Silver's Five and Dime Store-H.L. Green Co.	August 4, 2005 (#05000794)	1101-1103 Broadway; 32°28′01″N 84°59′37″W	Columbus	
110	Sixteenth Street School	Sixteenth Street School	September 29, 1980 (#80001200)	1532 3rd Ave. 32°28′33″N 84°59′20″W	Columbus	
111	Southern Railway Freight Depot	Southern Railway Freight Depot	August 21, 1997 (#97000922)	1300 6th Ave. 32°28′17″N 84°59′05″W	Columbus	
112	William Henry Spencer House	William Henry Spencer House	May 23, 1978 (#78000996)	745 4th Ave. 32°27′39″N 84°59′17″W	Columbus	
113	Springer Opera House	Springer Opera House	December 29, 1970 (#70000214)	105 10th St. 32°27′54″N 84°59′29″W	Columbus	National Historic Landmark
114	St. Christoper's Normal and Industrial Parish School	St. Christoper's Normal and Industrial Parish School	September 29, 1980 (#80001201)	900 5th Ave. 32°27′46″N 84°59′10″W	Columbus	Removed
115	St. Elmo	St. Elmo	April 7, 1971 (#71000284)	2810 St. Elmo Dr. 32°29′21″N 84°57′58″W	Columbus	
116	St. John Chapel	St. John Chapel	September 29, 1980 (#80001202)	1516 5th Ave. 32°28′29″N 84°59′10″W	Columbus	
117	Swift Manufacturing Company	Swift Manufacturing Company	September 10, 2014 (#14000173)	1410 6th St. 32°28′27″N 84°59′04″W	Columbus	
118	Swift-Kyle House	Swift-Kyle House	April 11, 1973 (#73000635)	303 12th St. 32°28′09″N 84°59′20″W	Columbus	
119	C. B. Tarver Building	C. B. Tarver Building	August 4, 2005 (#05000793)	18-23 W. 11th St. 32°28′01″N 84°59′40″W	Columbus	
120	Alma Thomas House	Alma Thomas House	October 20, 2009 (#09000270)	411 21st St. 32°29′04″N 84°59′13″W	Columbus	
121	Triangle Building	Triangle Building	September 29, 1980 (#80001204)	1330 Broadway; 32°28′17″N 84°59′35″W	Columbus	Removed
122	Trinity Episcopal Church	Trinity Episcopal Church	September 29, 1980 (#80001205)	1130 1st Ave. 32°28′03″N 84°59′30″W	Columbus	
123	Charles E. Turner House	Charles E. Turner House	September 29, 1980 (#80001206)	909 3rd Ave. 32°27′48″N 84°59′22″W	Columbus	
124	U.S. Post Office and Courthouse	U.S. Post Office and Courthouse	September 29, 1980 (#80001207)	120 12th St. 32°28′06″N 84°59′27″W	Columbus	
125	W. Jacob Burrus House		December 2, 1980 (#80001208)	307 11th St. 32°28′00″N 84°59′20″W	Columbus	Removed
126	Walker-Peters-Langdon House	Walker-Peters-Langdon House	July 29, 1969 (#69000050)	716 Broadway; 32°27′36″N 84°59′41″W	Columbus	
127	Waverly Terrace	Waverly Terrace	December 1, 1983 (#83003598)	Roughly bounded by Hamilton Rd., Peabody Ave., 27th and 30th Sts. 32°29′23″N 84°58′44″W	Columbus	
128	Wells-Bagley House	Wells-Bagley House	July 29, 1969 (#69000051)	22 6th St. 32°27′25″N 84°59′32″W	Columbus	
129	Weracoba-St. Elmo Historic District	Weracoba-St. Elmo Historic District	July 1, 1994 (#94000665)	Roughly bounded by 13th and Virginia Sts., 13th, 15th, 16th and Cherokee Aves. and Talbotton Rd. 32°28′51″N 84°58′05″W	Columbus	
130	Wolfson Printing and Paper Co.	Wolfson Printing and Paper Co.	December 2, 1980 (#80001211)	24 W. 10th St. 32°27′54″N 84°59′40″W	Columbus	
131	Ernest Woodruff House	Ernest Woodruff House	September 29, 1980 (#80001212)	1414 2nd Ave. 32°28′22″N 84°59′25″W	Columbus	
132	Henry Lindsay Woodruff House	Henry Lindsay Woodruff House	December 2, 1980 (#80001176)	1535 3rd Ave. 32°28′32″N 84°59′21″W	Columbus	
133	Henry Lindsay Woodruff Second House	Henry Lindsay Woodruff Second House	September 29, 1980 (#80001213)	1420 2nd Ave. 32°28′23″N 84°59′25″W	Columbus	
134	John W. Woolfolk House	John W. Woolfolk House	January 22, 1979 (#79000738)	1615 12th St. 32°28′07″N 84°58′06″W	Columbus	
135	Wynn House	Wynn House	February 1, 1972 (#72000394)	1240 Wynnton Rd. 32°27′57″N 84°58′28″W	Columbus	
136	Wynn's Hill-Overlook-Oak Circle Historic District	Wynn's Hill-Overlook-Oak Circle Historic District	May 10, 2005 (#05000403)	Roughly bounded by Bradley Rd., Buena Vista Rd., Overlook Ave., Crest Dr., and Oakview Ave. 32°27′53″N 84°58′14″W	Columbus	
137	Wynnton Academy	Wynnton Academy	April 11, 1972 (#72000395)	2303 Wynnton Rd. 32°28′16″N 84°57′31″W	Columbus	
138	Wynnton Village Historic District	Wynnton Village Historic District	June 22, 2005 (#05000622)	Roughly bounded by Wildwood Ave., Forest Ave., 18th St., 13th St., 16th ave. Wynnton Rd. 32°28′22″N 84°57′49″W	Columbus	
139	Wynnwood	Wynnwood	January 20, 1972 (#72000396)	1846 Buena Vista Rd. 32°27′56″N 84°57′57″W	Columbus	Also known as "The Elms"
140	Y.M.C.A.	Y.M.C.A.	September 29, 1980 (#80001214)	124 11th St. 32°27′59″N 84°59′27″W	Columbus	

== Former listings ==
	Name on the Register	Image	Date listed	Date removed	Location	City or town	Description
1	Building at 1429 Second Avenue		September 29, 1980 (#80001133)	July 7, 2004	1429 Second Avenue	Columbus	Demolished in 1988
2	Building at 1520 Second Avenue		September 29, 1980 (#80001134)	July 7, 2004	1520 Second Avenue	Columbus	Demolished in 1988
3	Building at 1524 Second Avenue		September 29, 1980 (#80001135)	July 7, 2004	1524 Second Avenue	Columbus	Demolished in 1988
4	Building at 1606 Third Avenue		September 29, 1980 (#80001136)	July 7, 2004	1606 Third Avenue	Columbus	Demolished in 1988
5	Walter W. Curtis House		September 29, 1980 (#80001160)	July 7, 2004	1427 Second Ave	Columbus	Demolished in 1988
6	John T. Davis House		September 29, 1980 (#80001161)	July 7, 2004	1526 Third Ave	Columbus	Demolished in 1988
7	William P. Hunt House		September 29, 1980 (#80001177)	July 7, 2004	1527 Second Ave; 32°27′28″N 84°59′39″W	Columbus	Relocated to 612 Front Avenue in 1988.
8	John Lecroy House		September 29, 1980 (#80001182)	July 7, 2004	1640 Third Ave	Columbus	Demolished in 1988
9	Patrick J. McSorley House		September 29, 1980 (#80001185)	July 7, 2004	1500 Second Ave	Columbus	Demolished in 1988
10	Charles Mischke House		September 29, 1980 (#80001187)	July 7, 2004	1638 Third Ave	Columbus	Demolished in 1988
11	George A. Pearce House		September 29, 1980 (#80001189)	July 7, 2004	1519 Second Ave	Columbus	Demolished in 1988
12	Joseph F. Pou Jr. House		September 29, 1980 (#80001192)	July 7, 2004	1528 Second Ave; 32°27′31″N 84°59′27″W	Columbus	Relocated to 639 Second Avenue in 1993.
13	William Price House		September 29, 1980 (#80001192)	July 7, 2004	1620 Third Ave	Columbus	Demolished in 1988
14	John Stewart House		September 29, 1980 (#80001203)	July 7, 2004	1618 Third Ave.	Columbus	Demolished in 1988
15	James A. Walton House	James A. Walton House	September 29, 1980 (#80001209)	July 7, 2004	1523 Second Ave. 32°27′27″N 84°59′40″W	Columbus	Moved to 604 Front Avenue in 1988.

== See also ==
- National Register of Historic Places listings in Georgia
