= Timeline of Columbus, Georgia =

The following is a timeline of the history of the city of Columbus, Georgia, US.

== 19th century ==
- 1828
  - Columbus settled on site of formerly Creek village.
  - Mirabeau B. Lamar begins publication of the Columbus Enquirer newspaper.
  - Methodist Church established.
  - Old City Cemetery founded.
- 1829 - Baptist Church established.
- 1830 - Population: 1,152.
- 1834 - Columbus Factory (textiles) in business.
- 1836 - Columbus becomes "center of military operations" against the Creek during the Creek War of 1836, fought nearby.
- 1840 - Wynnton School built (approximate date).
- 1846 - Fire.
- 1847 - Columbus Board of Trade founded.
- 1850
  - Columbus Times newspaper begins publication.
  - Population: 5,042.
- 1853
  - Mobile & Girard Railroad begins operating.
  - Columbus Iron Works built.
  - Columbus Georgia Convention & Trade Center built.
- 1854 - Temple Israel founded.
- 1856 - Pemberton House built.
- 1860 - Population: 9,621.
- 1865 - April 16: Battle of Columbus; Union forces win.
- 1867 - Rankin House built.
- 1868 - Eagle & Phenix Mill in operation.
- 1869 - Muscogee Mills in business.
- 1870
  - Bethel Baptist Church built (approximate date).
  - Population: 7,401.
- 1871
  - Springer Opera House opens.
  - Lummus Cotton Gin manufactory relocates to Columbus.
- 1879 - Confederate Monument erected.
- 1880 - Population: 10,123.
- 1886
  - Columbus Evening Ledger newspaper begins publication.
  - Future singer Ma Rainey born in Columbus.
- 1887
  - Columbus Messenger newspaper begins publication.
  - Synagogue dedicated.
- 1890 - Population: 17,303.
- 1900 - Population: 17,614.

== 20th century ==
- 1902 - Columbian Lodge No.7 Free and Accepted Masons building built.
- 1905
  - "Academic trade school" established.
  - Cole-Hampton-Hatcher Grocery introduces flavored beverage Royal Crown Ginger Ale.
- 1910 - Population: 20,554.
- 1914 - Grand Theatre built.
- 1918
  - U.S. military Camp Benning established near Columbus.
  - Textile labor unrest.
  - National Association for the Advancement of Colored People Columbus branch organized (approximate date).
- 1920 - League of Women Voters of Columbus organized.
- 1921 - Centennial Cotton Gin Company relocates to Columbus.
- 1925 - Tom Huston Peanut and Candy Co. in business.
- 1926 - Lake Harding reservoir created on the Chattahoochee River near Columbus.
- 1928
  - WRBL radio begins broadcasting.
  - Muscogee County Courthouse built.
- 1929
  - Social Civic 25 Club organized.
  - Columbus Municipal Airport commences operations.
- 1930 - Spencer High School, the first African American high school in Columbus.
- 1936 - Junior League of Columbus established.
- 1940
  - Bradley Theatre opens.
  - Population: 53,280.
- 1944 - Muscogee County Airport (present-day Columbus Airport) commences operations.
- 1949 - Columbus Symphony Orchestra active.
- 1950
  - Columbus Drive-In cinema in business.
- 1953
  - WRBL-TV and WTVM (television) begin broadcasting.
  - Columbus Museum of Arts and Crafts opens.
- 1958 - Columbus College established.
- 1960 - Population: 116,779.
- 1962 - National Civil War Naval Museum opened.
- 1965 - B. Ed Johnson becomes mayor.
- 1966 - Historic Columbus Foundation formed.
- 1970 - Population: 154,168.
- 1971
  - Columbus joins with Muscogee County to form a consolidated city-county.
  - Racial unrest.
- 1972 - Metro Columbus Urban League established.
- 1975 - Historic District Preservation Society organized.
- 1976 - Chattahoochee Promenade built.
- 1979 - Columbus' only Interstate highway, auxiliary Interstate 185 fully opens, provide a freeway connection for Columbus to mainline Interstate 85 and Atlanta.
- 1980 - Population: 169,441.
- 1983 - Richard Ray becomes U.S. representative for Georgia's 3rd congressional district.
- 1988 - Columbus Ledger-Enquirer newspaper in publication.
- 1990 - Population: 178,681.
- 1993 - Sanford Bishop becomes U.S. representative for Georgia's 2nd congressional district.
- 1996
  - First ever Olympic Softball competition held at South Commons complex July 21–30.
  - Columbus Civic Center (arena) opens.
  - City website online (approximate date).

== 21st century ==
- 2009 - National Infantry Museum founded.
- 2010 - Population: 189,885.
- 2011 - Teresa Tomlinson becomes mayor.

== See also ==
- Columbus, Georgia history
- List of mayors of Columbus, Georgia
- National Register of Historic Places listings in Muscogee County, Georgia
- Timelines of other cities in Georgia: Athens, Atlanta, Augusta, Macon, Savannah

== Bibliography ==
- George White (1849), "Muscogee: Columbus", Statistics of the State of Georgia, Savannah: W. Thorne Williams, OCLC 1349061 – via Internet Archive
- John P. Campbell, ed. (1854). "Georgia: Muscogee County". Southern Business Directory. Charleston, SC: Press of Walker & James – via Google Books.
- Adiel Sherwood (1860), "Muscogee County: Columbus", Gazetteer of Georgia (4th ed.), Macon: S. Boykin
- "Columbus (2.)" . Encyclopædia Britannica. Vol. 6 (9th ed.). 1878. p. 171.
- Industries of Columbus, Georgia. T. Gilbert. 1887. hdl:2027/loc.ark:/13960/t9280mb7z.
- Columbus, Her Trade, Commerce and Industries. Columbus: J. E. Land Publishing Company. 1892.
- "Columbus (Georgia)" . Encyclopædia Britannica. Vol. 6 (11th ed.). 1910. p. 746.
- Frederick Converse Beach; George Edwin Rines, eds. (1912), "Columbus", The Americana, vol. 5, New York: Scientific American Compiling Department, hdl:2027/nyp.33433005016187 – via HathiTrust
- Nancy Telfair (1929). History of Columbus, Georgia: 1828-1928.
- Federal Writers' Project (1973) [1940], "Columbus", Georgia: a Guide to Its Towns and Countryside, American Guide Series, Athens: University of Georgia Press, pp. 214–223, ISBN 9781603540100 – via Google Books
- John S. Lupold (1979a). "Historic Columbus Foundation, 1966-1978". Georgia Historical Quarterly. 63 (1): 129–137. JSTOR 40580089.
- John S. Lupold (1979b). "Revitalizing Foundries, Hotels, and Grist Mills in Columbus". Georgia Historical Quarterly. 63 (1): 138–142. JSTOR 40580090.
- Frank J. Byrne (1997). "Wartime Agitation and Postwar Repression: Reverend John A. Callan and the Columbus Strikes of 1918-1919". Georgia Historical Quarterly. 81 (2): 345–369. JSTOR 40583648.
- Judith Grant (1999). Columbus, Georgia. Black America. Charleston, South Carolina: Arcadia.
- Lynn Willoughby (1999). Flowing Through Time: A History of the Lower Chattahoochee River. University of Alabama Press. ISBN 978-0-8173-5725-2.
- Kenneth H. Thomas Jr. (2001). Columbus, Georgia in Vintage Postcards. Arcadia. ISBN 978-1-4396-1094-7.
- Paul T. Hellmann (2005). "Georgia: Columbus". Historical Gazetteer of the United States. Taylor & Francis. pp. 224–225. ISBN 1-135-94859-3.
- David M. Owings (2015). Columbus. Images of America. Arcadia. ISBN 978-1-4396-5254-1.
