= Pemberton House =

Pemberton House may refer to:

in the United States (by state)

- Pemberton House (Beebe, Arkansas), formerly listed on the National Register of Historic Places in White County, Arkansas
- Pemberton House (Columbus, Georgia), listed on the National Register of Historic Places in Muscogee County, Georgia
- Pemberton Farm, Clark, Kentucky, listed on the National Register of Historic Places in Shelby County, Kentucky
- Pemberton's Headquarters, Vicksburg, Mississippi, listed on the NRHP in Warren County, Mississippi
- Phineas Pemberton House, Levittown, Pennsylvania, listed on the National Register of Historic Places in Bucks County, Pennsylvania
- Pemberton Mansion and Oak, Bristol, Tennessee, listed on the National Register of Historic Places in Sullivan County, Tennessee

== See also ==
- Pemberton Hall (disambiguation)
