= Billings House =

Billings House may refer to:

- Billings House (Florida), Liberty Billing's historic house in Florida
- Billings Estate Museum, a historic residence in Ottawa, Ontario
- Swift-Kyle House, a historic residence in Columbus, Georgia
- Frederick Billings House, a historic house in Cambridge, Massachusetts
