= High Uptown Historic District =

- U.S. National Register of Historic Places
- Location within Georgia
- Location: Roughly bounded by 2nd and 3rd Aves. between Railroad and 13th Sts., Columbus, Georgia
- Coordinates: 32°28′25″N 84°59′22″W
- Area: 20 acres (8.1 ha)
- Built: 1838
- Architect: Multiple
- Architectural style: Late Victorian, Late 19th And 20th Century Revivals
- MPS: Columbus MRA
- NRHP reference No.: 04000669
- Added to NRHP: July 7, 2004

The High Uptown Historic District, in Columbus, Georgia, is a 20 acres (8.1 ha) historic district which was listed on the National Register of Historic Places in 2004. The listing included 39 contributing buildings and 18 non-contributing ones.

The district is roughly bounded by 2nd and 3rd Avenues between Railroad and 13th Streets.

The district included 24 properties already listed on the National Register, including:

1. Peabody-Warner House, NRHP-listed in 1970
2. Lion House, NRHP-listed in 1972;
3. Rankin House (c.1860), NRHP-listed in 1972;
4. Illges House (c.1850), NRHP-listed in June 1973;
5. Bullard-Hart House, NRHP-listed in July 1977;
6. House at 1628 3rd Avenue, (reported to be NRHP-listed in April 1979 but no longer or not ever NRHP-listed, has listing code "DR")
7. Building at 1400 3rd Avenue, NRHP-listed in September 1980,
8. Building at 1617 3rd Avenue, NRHP-listed in September 1980,
9. Building at 1619 3rd Avenue, NRHP-listed in September 1980,
10. Building at 1625 3rd Avenue (c.1889), Greek Revival cottage, NRHP-listed in September 1980,
11. Walter Cargill House, NRHP-listed in September 1980,
12. Garrett-Bullock House, NRHP-listed in September 1980,
13. John Paul Illges House, NRHP-listed in September 1980,
14. Methodist Tabernacle, NRHP-listed in September 1980,
15. George Phillips House, NRHP-listed in September 1980,
16. Sixteenth Street School, NRHP-listed in September 1980,
17. Ernest Woodruff House, NRHP-listed in September 1980,
18. Henry Lindsay Woodruff Second House, NRHP-listed in September 1980,
19. Building at 1531 3rd Avenue, NRHP-listed in December 1980,
20. Building at 1519 3rd Avenue, NRHP-listed in December 1980,
21. William L. Cooke House, NRHP-listed in December 1980,
22. Elisha P. Dismukes House, NRHP-listed in December 1980,
23. Isaac Maund House, NRHP-listed in December 1980,
24. Henry Lindsay Woodruff House, NRHP-listed in December 1980.

The oldest buildings are the Illges House (c.1850) and the Rankin House (c.1860).
