= City Fire Department =

City Fire Department may refer to:

- City Fire Department (Columbus, Georgia), listed on the NRHP in Georgia

or any one of numerous other city fire departments, including, for example:

- Kansas City Fire Department
- New York City Fire Department

and there are many others.
