= Ironworks (disambiguation) =

Ironworks may refer to:

- Ironworks, a building or site where iron is smelted and where heavy iron and/or steel products are produced
  - The Columbus Ironworks building
- Ironwork, artifacts or architectural features made of iron
- Ironworks (record label)
- Iron Works (2008), an album by American hip hop artist Ka
- The Micromasters transformer
