= Columbus Historic District (Columbus, Georgia) =

Historic district in Georgia, United States

- U.S. National Register of Historic Places
- U.S. Historic district
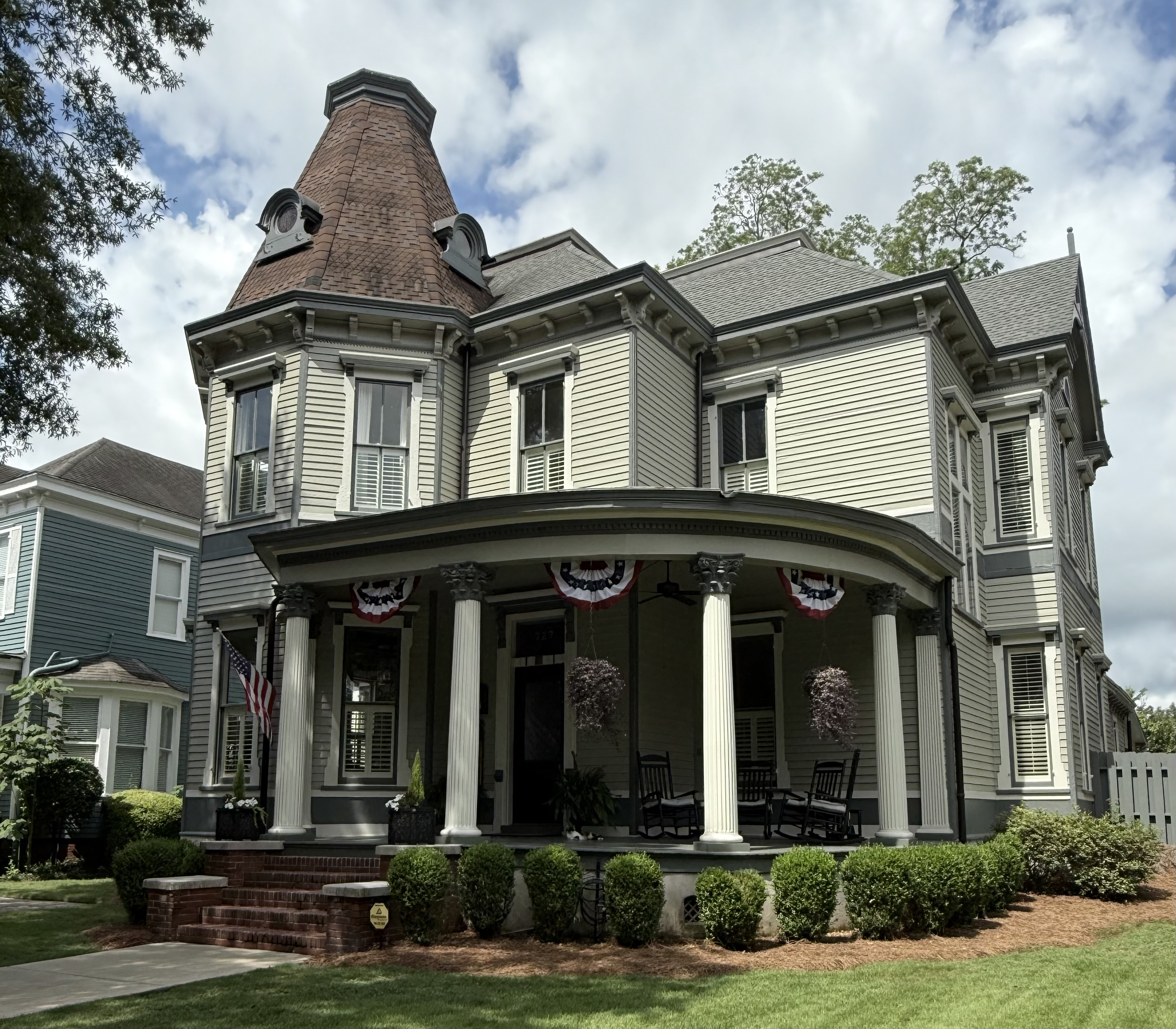
- 727 Broadway, a house in the district

- Location within Georgia Location within the United States
- Location: Roughly bounded by 9th and 4th sts., 4th Ave., and the Chattahoochee River (original), Bounded by Ninth and Fourth Sts., Chattahoochee River and Fourth Ave. (increase), Columbus, Georgia
- Coordinates: 32°27′29″N 84°59′32″W
- Architect: Thomas, Edward Lloyd (increase)
- Architectural style: Greek Revival, Georgian, Italian Villa (original); Mid 19th Century Revival, Late 19th And 20th Century Revivals, Late Victorian (increase)
- NRHP reference No.: 69000045 and (original); 88002048 (increase)

Significant dates
- Added to NRHP: July 29, 1969 (original)
- Boundary increase: October 21, 1988 (increase)

Columbus Historic District in Columbus, Georgia is a historic district that was listed on the National Register of Historic Places in 1969. Its area was increased in 1988. The original district included 20 city blocks and nine partial city blocks, and was bounded by the Chattahoochee River on the west, Ninth Street on the north, Fourth Avenue (U.S. Highway 27) on the east, and Fourth Street on the south.

The expanded district included 343 contributing buildings, one other structure, three sites, and one object (an 1879 Confederate war memorial).

Fifteen of the historic houses had been moved but were still deemed to contribute to the historic character of the district.

It includes the antebellum octagon house at 527 1st Avenue, a National Historic Landmark, named Octagon House or May's Folly.

== See also ==
- Garrett & Sons Wholesale
