= Lion House =

Lion House may refer to:

- Lion House (Columbus, Georgia), a historic house (also known as the Hoxey-Cargill House) in Columbus, Georgia, United States, listed on the National Register of Historic Places
- Lion House (Kaluga), a cultural heritage monument in Kaluga, Kaluga Oblast, Russia
- Lion House (Salt Lake City), a former residence of Brigham Young in Salt Lake City, Utah, United States
- Lion House, Chaguanas, Trinidad and Tobago, a.k.a. Anand Bhavan, the ancestral house of the Capildeo family and inspiration for the setting of V.S. Naipaul's acclaimed novel A House for Mr. Biswas
