= May's Folly =

May's Folly may refer to:

- Hadlow Tower, in Kent, England, known locally as May's Folly
- Octagon House (Columbus, Georgia), United States, known as May's Folly
