= First National Bank (Columbus, Georgia) =

- U.S. National Register of Historic Places
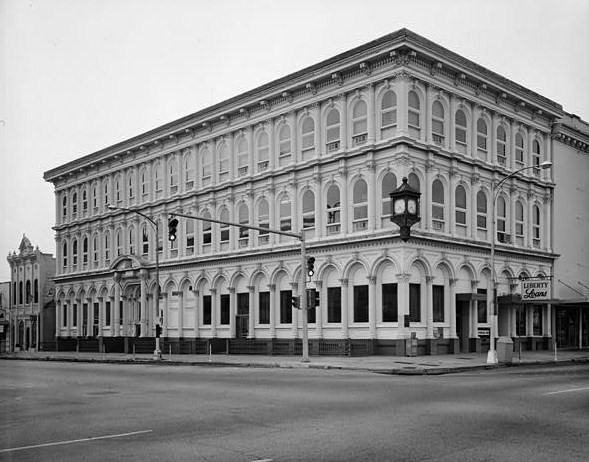
- Bank of Columbus (First National Bank of Columbus) photograph by the Historic American Buildings Survey

- Location within Georgia Location within the United States
- Location: 1048 Broadway, Columbus, Georgia
- Coordinates: 32°27′52″N 84°59′36″W
- Area: less than one acre
- Built: 1860
- Built by: William H. Young
- Architectural style: Italian Renaissance
- NRHP reference No.: 74000697
- Added to NRHP: November 1, 1974

First National Bank, also known as Bank of Columbus, is a historic building in Columbus, Georgia. It is a cast iron office building built for the Bank of Columbus at a cost of $50,000 and used by the bank during 1860–66. After the bank apparently went bankrupt, the building was bought at auction for $28,000 by the Georgia Home Insurance Company. It has been used by various banks since, including the First National Bank of Columbus in 1974. It was known to locals as the Iron Bank. It is located at 1048 Broadway.

The building was featured on a 50 cent paper note issued by the Bank of Columbus. It was added to the National Register of Historic Places in 1974.

The building's cast iron front and cast iron cage were shipped from New York and Pittsburgh.

== See also ==
- National Register of Historic Places listings in Muscogee County, Georgia
