= Pemberton Hall =

Pemberton Hall may refer to:

- Pemberton Hall (Eastern Illinois University), Charleston, Illinois
- Pemberton Hall (Salisbury, Maryland)

== See also ==
- Pemberton House (disambiguation)
