= NerdaCon =

Multi-genre fan convention in the United States

Coordinates: 32.5024°N 84.9402°W

- Status: Defunct
- Genre: Multi-genre
- Venue: Columbus Georgia Convention & Trade Center (2015 - 2016); Columbus State University Davidson Center and Schuster Center (2007 - 2014)
- Locations: Columbus, Georgia
- Country: United States
- Inaugurated: March 2007
- Most recent: November 2016
- Organizer: Campus Nerds of Columbus State University
- Filing status: Non-profit
- Website: http://www.nerdacon.org

NerdaCon was a multi-genre fan convention (first seen as a "gaming, popular arts, and crafts convention") held annually since 2007 at Columbus State University by the school's Campus Nerds group, a campus organization that describes itself as "an organization that embraces all special interests and gives its members a community of like minded individuals". Each year, the con was titled "NerdaCon vX", where "X" is the number of the con (The first was "v1", the second was "v2", etc.). As it was a multi-genre convention, it had no general focus other than that of the Nerds, in that the panels, guests, and dealers each added a focus toward anime, manga, science fiction, gaming, comic books, zombie apocalypse, or a combination of these or other generally nerdy or geeky things to add to the atmosphere. NerdaCon was a free event to the general public until NerdaCon v9, in which it switched to a paid admission system in order to support its move from Columbus State University to the Columbus Convention and Trade Center in 2015, where it had been for NerdaCon v10 and v11. NerdaCon helped support organizations such as Children's Miracle Network and the Hero Initiative through donations.

By tradition, the convention was held on a Friday and Saturday in November, from 6:00 PM to 11:00 PM on the Friday, and 10:00 AM to 11:00 PM on the Saturday. However, since NerdaCon v6 was held on November 11, 2011 (11/11/11), each day was extended by 11 minutes, making it end at 11:11 PM.

== Events ==
NerdaCon held many events throughout the span of the convention, including boffer, trading card, and video game tournaments (and casual play), a costume contest to judge the best Cosplay, and the Saturday night dance with music from guest DJs. NerdaCon also offered a vendor hall with many vendors and artists selling goods, multiple panel rooms hosting a variety of topics, an anime viewing room, and a variety of special guests.

=== Event History ===
Version	Dates	Location
v1	March 25, 2007	Columbus State University - Davidson Student Center; Columbus, Georgia
v2	November 9–10, 2007	Columbus State University - Davidson Student Center; Columbus, Georgia
v3	November 14–15, 2008	Columbus State University - Davidson Student Center; Columbus, Georgia
v4	November 13–14, 2009	Columbus State University - Davidson Student Center; Columbus, Georgia
v5	November 12–13, 2010	Columbus State University - Davidson Student Center and Schuster Student Success Center; Columbus, Georgia
v6	November 11–12, 2011 (1800 - 2311 and 1000 - 2311, respectively)	Columbus State University - Davidson Student Center, Schuster Student Success Center, Student Recreation Center (Costume Contest and Raffle only); Columbus, Georgia
v7	November 16–17, 2012 (6:00 PM – 11:00 PM and 10:00 AM – 11:00 PM, respectively)	Columbus State University - Davidson Student Center, Schuster Student Success Center, University Hall; Columbus, Georgia
v8	November 15–16, 2013 (6:00 PM – 11:00 PM and 10:00 AM – 11:00 PM, respectively)	Columbus State University - Davidson Student Center, Schuster Student Success Center; Columbus, Georgia
v9	November 14–15, 2014 (6:00 PM – 11:00 PM and 10:00 AM – 11:00 PM, respectively)	Columbus State University - Davidson Student Center, Schuster Student Success Center, University Hall, Student Recreation Center; Columbus, Georgia
v10	November 6–7, 2015 (2:00 PM to 11:00 PM and 10:00 AM to 11:00 PM, respectively)	Columbus Georgia Convention & Trade Center; Columbus, Georgia
v11	November 11-12th 2016 (5:00 PM to 11:00 PM and 10:00 AM to 11:00 PM, respectively)	Columbus Georgia Convention & Trade Center; Columbus, Georgia
