= Broad Street Methodist Episcopal Church South =

Historic church in Georgia, United States

- U.S. National Register of Historic Places
- Location within Georgia Location within the United States
- Location: 1323–1325 Broadway, Columbus, Georgia
- Coordinates: 32°28′17″N 84°59′37″W
- Area: less than one acre
- Built: 1873
- Architectural style: Greek Revival
- MPS: Columbus MRA
- NRHP reference No.: 80001125
- Added to NRHP: December 2, 1980

Broad Street Methodist Episcopal Church South ("Old" Broad Street Methodist Episcopal Church South) in Columbus, Georgia is a historic church built in 1873. It is one of the oldest buildings on Broadway (Columbus's main street) and is as the only Greek Revival church building surviving in Columbus. It has pilasters with corbelled brick capitals.

It was added to the National Register in 1980.

It was home of the Columbus Ledger newspaper from 1915 to 1931.

It was listed on the National Register along with other historic properties identified in a large survey.
