= Thomas U. Butts House =

- Thomas V. Butts House
- U.S. National Register of Historic Places
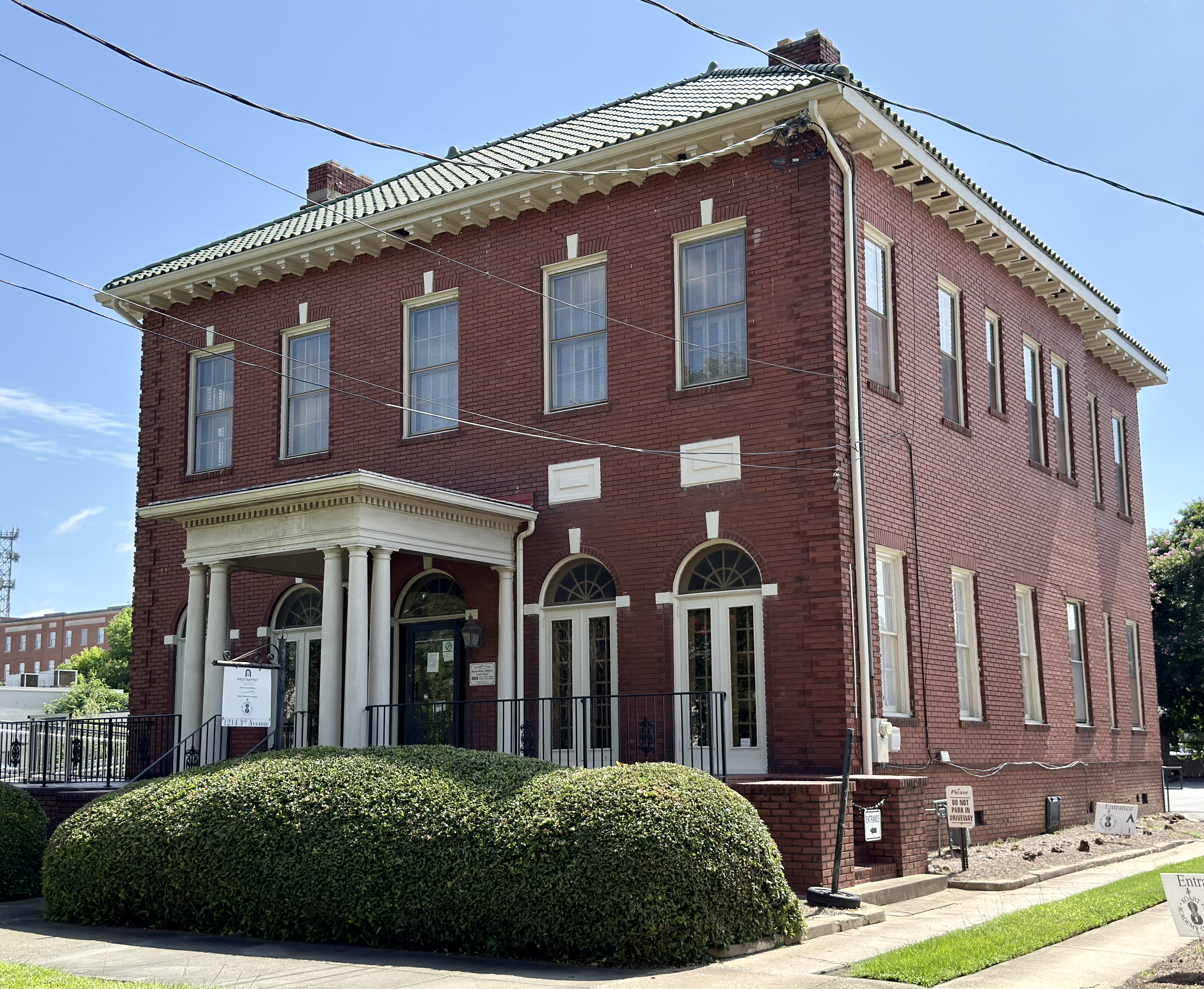
- The house in 2025

- Location within Georgia
- Location: 1214 3rd Ave. Columbus, Georgia
- Coordinates: 32°28′09″N 84°59′20″W
- Area: less than one acre
- Built: 1896
- Architectural style: Prairie School
- MPS: Columbus MRA
- NRHP reference No.: 80001146
- Added to NRHP: September 29, 1980

The Thomas U. Butts House, at 1214 3rd Ave. in Columbus, Georgia, was built in 1896 and was extensively renovated into Prairie School style in 1928. It was listed on the National Register of Historic Places in 1980.

It is a two-story balloon frame house with a clay tile hipped roof and two exterior chimneys. Originally showing a weatherboarded exterior, the house's 1928 renovation covered the weatherboarding with brick laid in stretcher bond. It has a central entrance with a Classical Revival-styled porch.

It was built for W. I. Struppa, a purser who lived there until 1904. It was sold in 1908 to Thomas Usher Butts, "a wizard of the lumber business", who raised his family there; descendants occupied the home until 1959.

Its National Register listing was within a batch of numerous Columbus properties determined to be eligible consistent with a 1980 study of historic resources in Columbus.
