= Temple Israel (Columbus, Georgia) =

Reform Jewish community in Georgia, USA

Coordinates: 32.4765°N 84.9587°W

Temple Israel is the second oldest Jewish congregation in Georgia, United States. Founded in 1854 as Temple B'nai Israel, a Charter Member of the Union of American Hebrew Congregations, now the Union for Reform Judaism, it remains a congregation affiliated with Reform Judaism. Today the Jewish population of Columbus is less than 750 individuals and Temple Israel community retains around 150 members.
