= Harrison-Gibson House =

- U.S. National Register of Historic Places
- Location within Georgia
- Location: 309 11th St., Columbus, Georgia
- Coordinates: 32°28′00″N 84°59′19″W
- Area: less than one acre
- Built: c. 1896
- Architectural style: Gothic
- MPS: Columbus MRA
- NRHP reference No.: 80001175
- Added to NRHP: September 29, 1980

The Harrison-Gibson House, at 309 11th St. in Columbus, Georgia, was built around 1896. It was listed on the National Register of Historic Places in 1980.

It is a two-story Victorian Gothic-style house with hipped and gable roof.

It was deemed significant partly for association with persons who lived there: it "was the home of Joseph Harrison, a salesman of shoes and boots, from 1896-1900. Also, this was the home of Carleton B. Gibson, who was superintendent of Columbus' public schools and who was largely responsible for the founding of Columbus' Industrial High School (in 1906) — the first of its kind in the United States. The purpose of the Industrial School was to provide the children whose parents worked in nearbv cottonmills with an academic trade school of high school ranking."

== See also ==
- Secondary Industrial School, also NRHP-listed
