= Garrett-Bullock House =

Historic house in Georgia, United States

- U.S. National Register of Historic Places
- U.S. Historic district – Contributing property
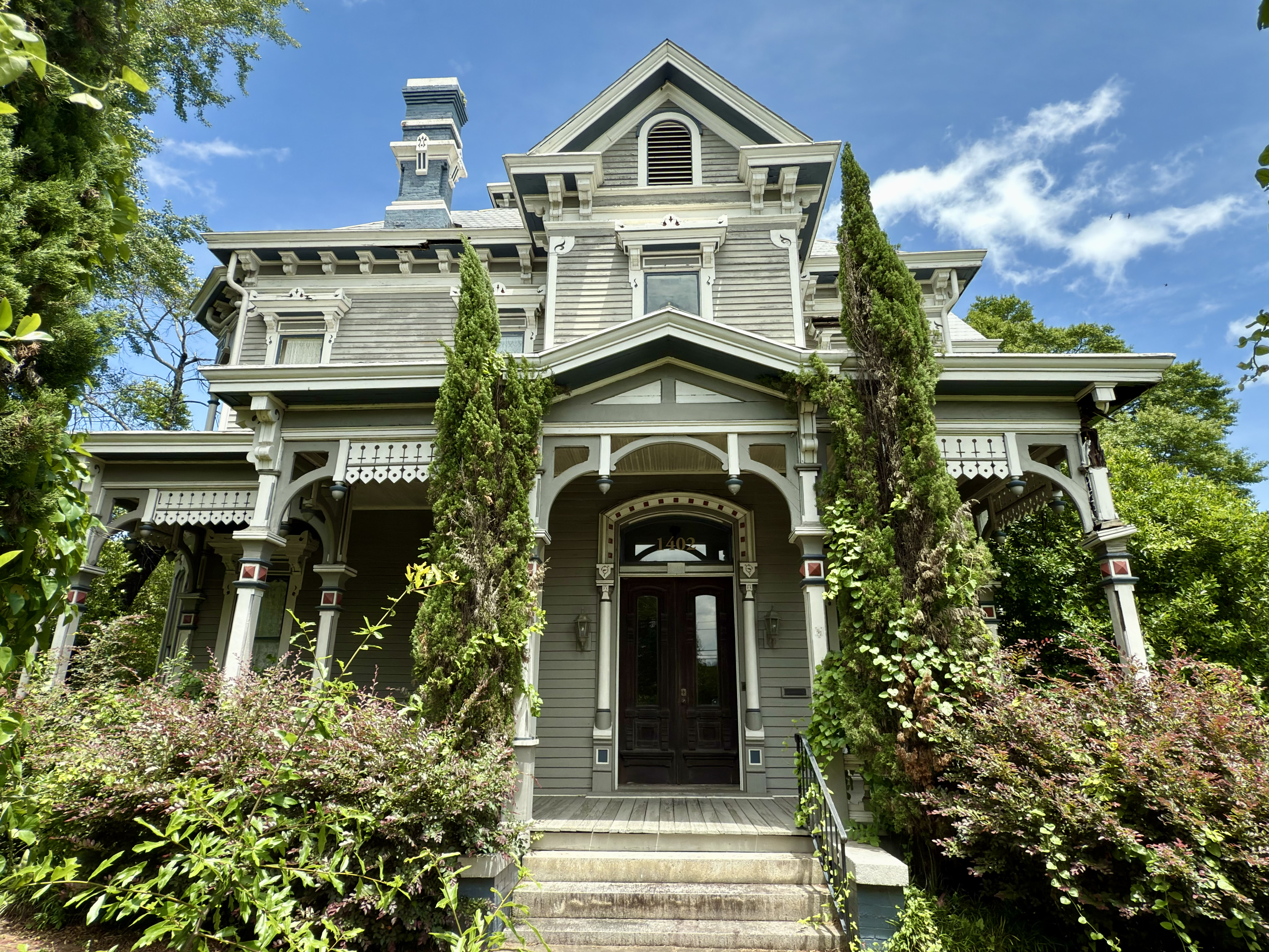
- Garrett-Bullock House in 2025

- Location within Georgia
- Location: 1402 2nd Ave. Columbus, Georgia
- Coordinates: 32°28′21″N 84°59′25″W
- Area: less than one acre
- Built: 1886
- Architectural style: Queen Anne
- Part of: High Uptown Historic District (ID04000669)
- MPS: Columbus MRA
- NRHP reference No.: 80001172

Significant dates
- Added to NRHP: September 29, 1980
- Designated CP: July 7, 2004

The Garrett-Bullock House is a historic Queen Anne-style house in Columbus, Georgia. It was listed on the National Register of Historic Places in 1980.

It was owned by Joseph Garrett, owner of a Broad Street wholesale liquor-and tobacco business known as "Garrett & Sons", and became a boarding house.

The Garrett-Bullock House may have been used as a special events center for weddings and parties.

It is separately listed in the National Register and also included in the High Uptown Historic District.
