= Frederick Billings House =

Historic house in Massachusetts, United States

- U.S. National Register of Historic Places
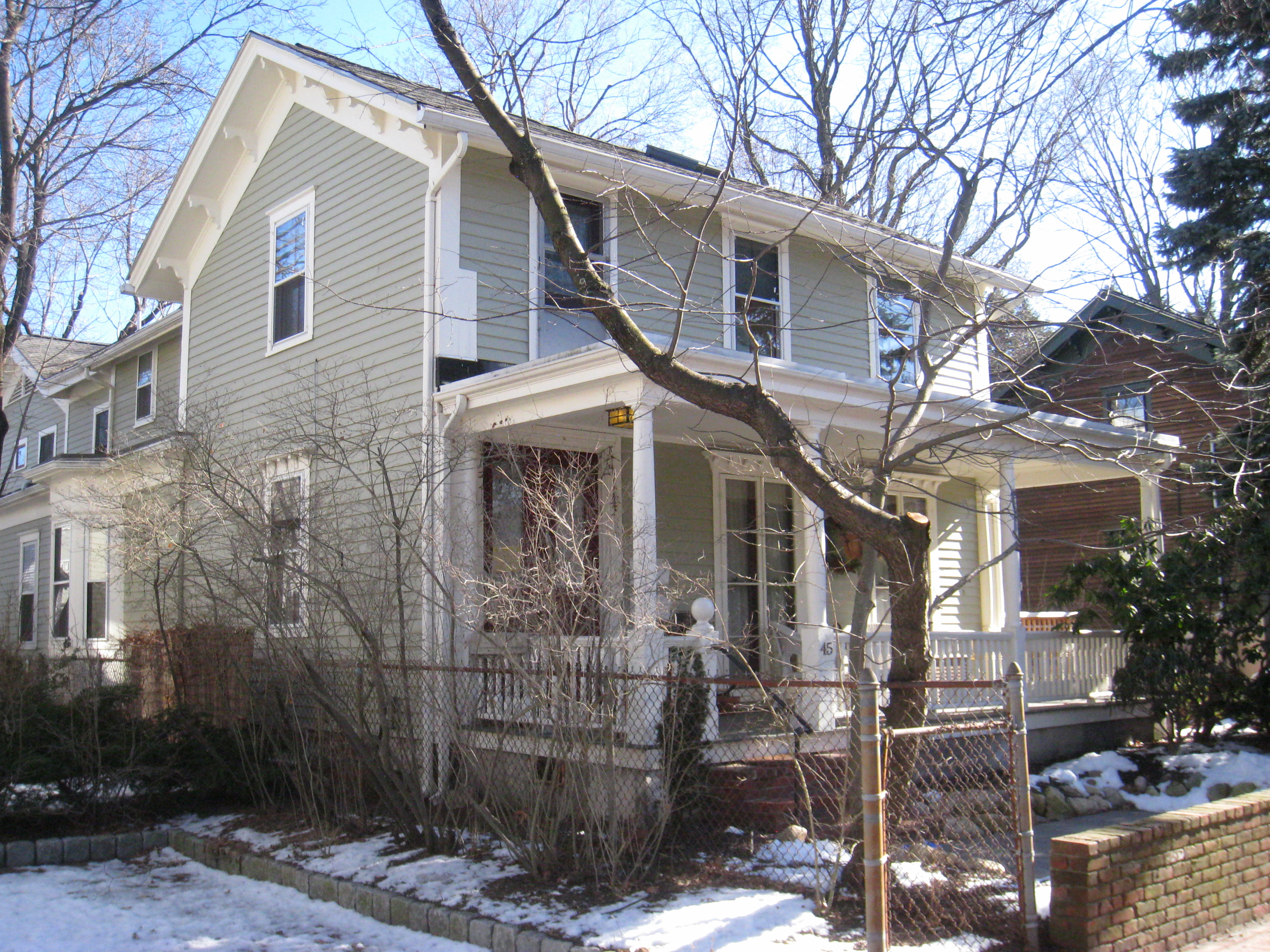

- Location within Massachusetts Location within the United States
- Location: 45 Orchard St., Cambridge, Massachusetts
- Coordinates: 42°23′30.1″N 71°07′13.8″W
- Area: less than one acre
- Built: 1846
- Architect: Joshua Fernald
- Architectural style: Italianate
- MPS: Cambridge MRA
- NRHP reference No.: 82001923
- Added to NRHP: April 13, 1982

The Frederick Billings House is an historic house in Cambridge, Massachusetts. Built in 1846, it is one of west Cambridge's first examples of residential housing with Italianate features. It was listed on the National Register of Historic Places in 1982.

== Description and history ==
The Frederick Billings House stands in a residential area northwest of Porter Square, on the northeast side of Orchard Street between Blake and Beech Streets. It is a 2 1/2-story wood-frame structure, with a side-gable roof and clapboarded exterior. A single-story porch extends across the front, supported by tapered round columns. The gable eaves have decorative brackets, and the ground floor windows on the front are topped by lintels adorned with small brackets. Two-story ells extend the original main block to the rear.

The house was built in 1846, not long after Orchard Street was platted for development. It was one of the first houses with Italianate styling to be built in the city (along with the adjacent John Aborn House), coming just one year after the style was introduced. The house was built by Joshua Fernald, a local master carpenter, and was located for convenient access to the Fitchburg Railroad depot (now the Porter MBTA station). The front porch is a later (1890s) addition.

== See also ==
- National Register of Historic Places listings in Cambridge, Massachusetts
