= Building at 1619 Third Avenue =

- U.S. National Register of Historic Places
- Location within Georgia
- Location: 1619 Third Ave. Columbus, Georgia
- Coordinates: 32°28′37″N 84°59′21″W
- Area: less than one acre
- Built: 1889
- Architectural style: Late Victorian
- MPS: Columbus MRA
- NRHP reference No.: 80001138
- Added to NRHP: September 29, 1980

The Building at 1619 Third Avenue in Columbus, Georgia, is a Victorian shotgun cottage. It was built around 1889 and was listed on the National Register of Historic Places in 1980.

It was home to lower to middle-income black workers in Columbus. By 1896, it was home to George W. Walls, a dyer for Eagle and Phenix Mills. By 1898, it was home for Mack Culver and his wife; Culver was a fireman for the Central of Georgia Railroad. By 1900, it was home to William Hines, another worker at Eagle and Phenix, and his wife, Clara.

Its front porch includes some gingerbreading attached to its chamfered columns as a nod by the builder to popular styles. Its National Register listing was within a batch of numerous Columbus properties determined to be eligible consistent with a 1980 study of historic resources in Columbus.

== See also ==
- Building at 1617 Third Avenue, adjacent and similar
