= Building at 1617 Third Avenue =

- U.S. National Register of Historic Places
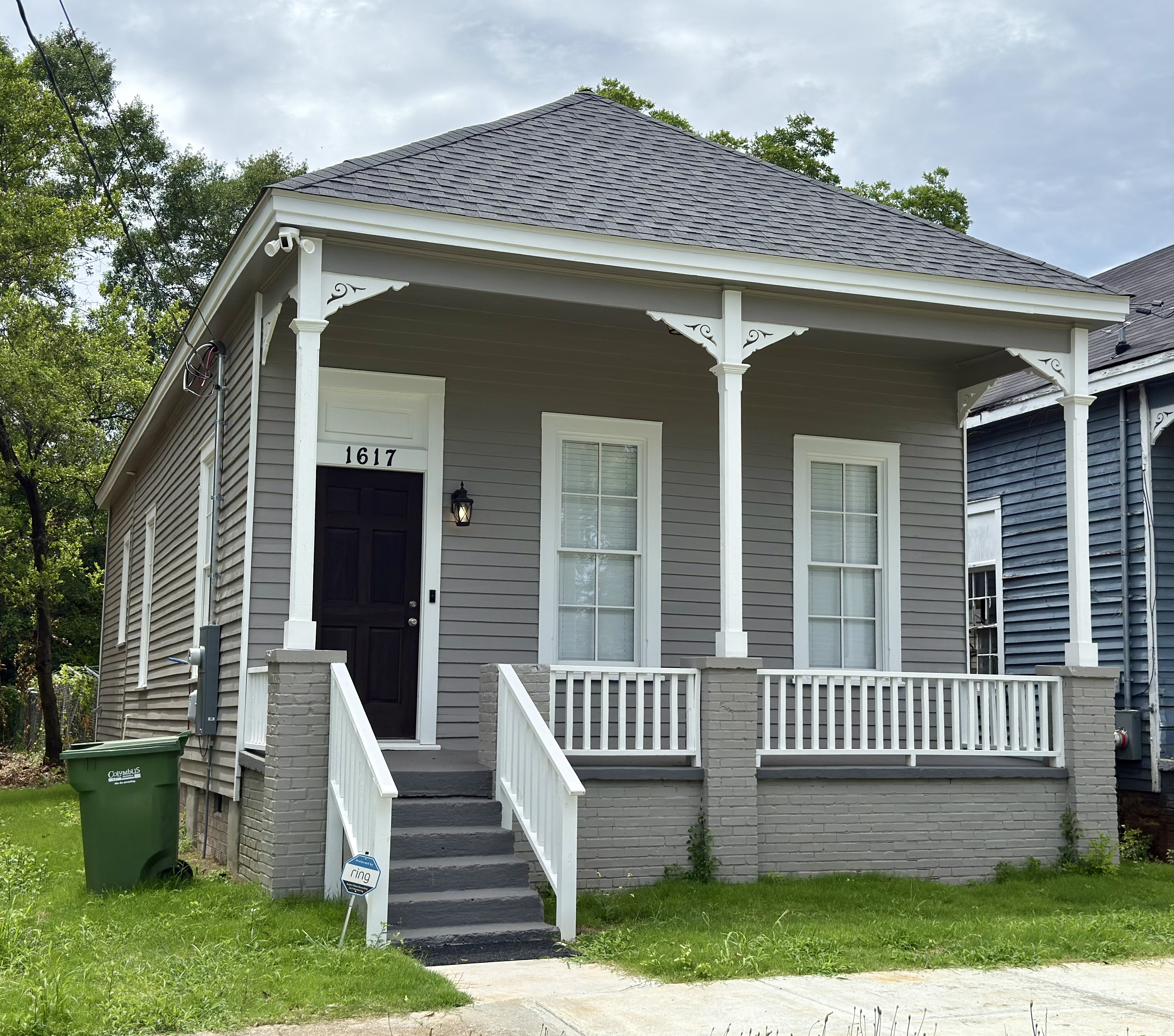
- The house in 2025

- Location within Georgia
- Location: 1617 Third Ave., Columbus, Georgia
- Coordinates: 32°28′37″N 84°59′21″W
- Area: less than one acre
- Built: c.1889; 137 years ago
- Architectural style: Late Victorian
- MPS: Columbus MRA
- NRHP reference No.: 80001137
- Added to NRHP: September 29, 1980

The Building at 1617 Third Avenue in Columbus, Georgia was listed on the National Register of Historic Places in 1980.

Built around 1889, it is a Victorian shotgun cottage house, hence it is a one-story weatherboarded rectangular plan house upon a brick pier foundation. It has a hipped roof and a central chimney. Its porch, across the three-bay front facade, has chamfered columns with gingerbread brackets.

Its National Register listing was within a batch of numerous Columbus properties determined to be eligible consistent with a 1980 study of historic resources in Columbus.

== See also ==
- Building at 1619 Third Avenue, adjacent and similar
