= Garrett & Sons Wholesale =

Garrett & Sons Wholesale is an historic building in Columbus, Georgia.

Joseph Simpson Garrett, a whiskey, tobacco, and groceries merchant, constructed this building in 1883 for his business, Garrett and Sons. This wholesale business was regarded as the first of its kind in Columbus.

Garrett served as the Columbus postmaster from 1897 to 1905. Many businesses occupied this building between 1900 and 1934. In that year, Simon Schwob, a tailor from Alsace-Lorraine, opened the Schwob Manufacturing Company. With its "factory to consumer" approach, Schwob became the largest manufacturer and retailer of menswear in the Southern United States. In 1978, Schwob Manufacturing became Joy Fashions. The company operated in this building until 1988.
