= Secondary Industrial School =

- U.S. National Register of Historic Places
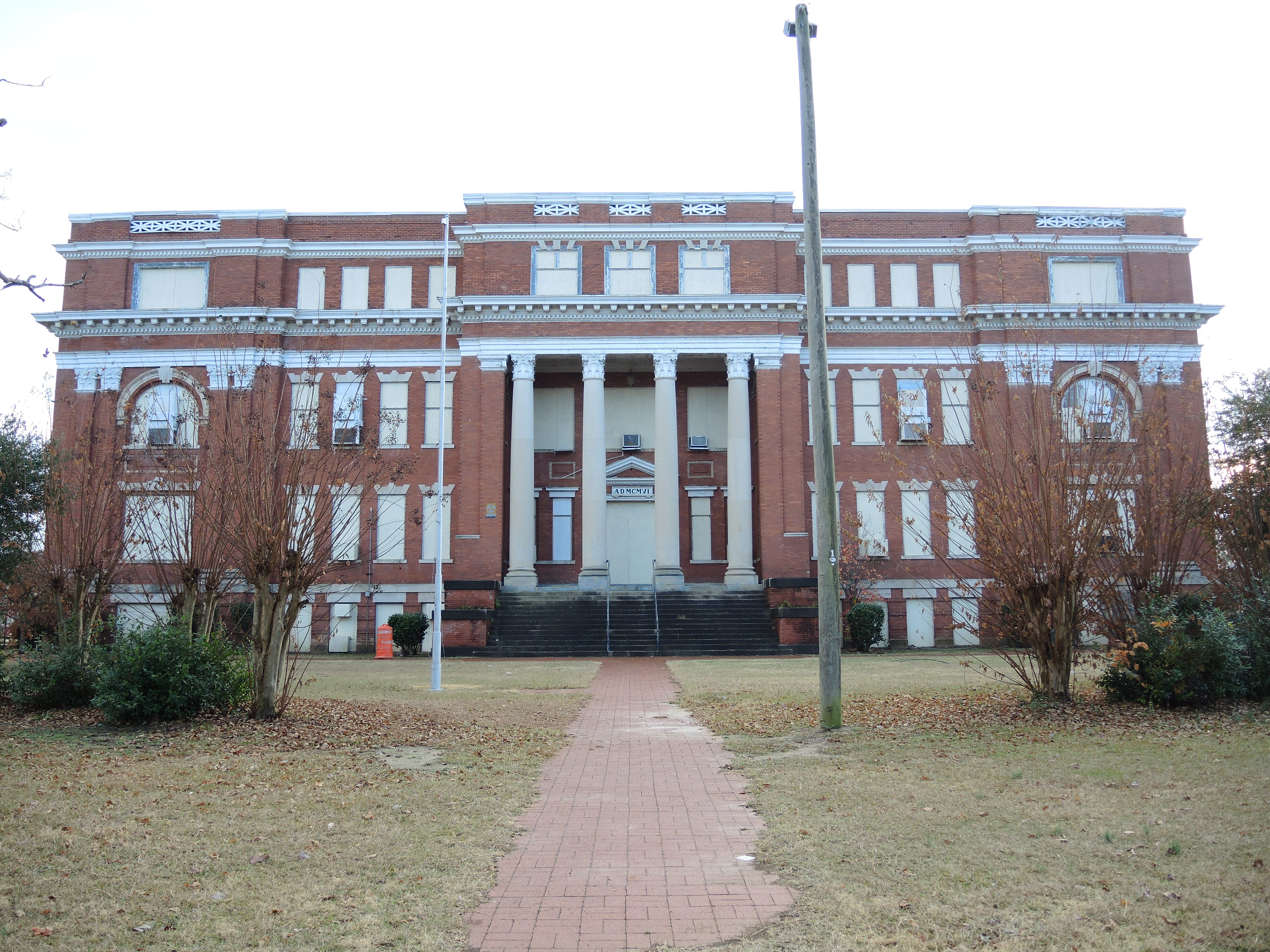

- Location within Georgia
- Location: 1112 29th St., Columbus, Georgia
- Coordinates: 32°29′21″N 84°58′41″W
- Area: 4.2 acres (1.7 ha)
- Built: 1906
- Architect: J.W. Golucke & Co.
- Architectural style: Beaux Arts
- NRHP reference No.: 80001199
- Added to NRHP: April 9, 1980

The Secondary Industrial School in Columbus, Georgia is a historic school built in 1906. It was the first secondary-level industrial/vocational school in the United States: it "has been called the nation's first public-supported, coeducational industrial high school." Located at 1112 29th St., the building was designed by J.W. Golucke & Co. in Beaux Arts style. It was listed on the National Register of Historic Places in 1980.

It has also been known as S.I.S., as Columbus Junior High, and as Jordan Vocational High.

It was a project of Carleton B. Gibson, who became Superintendent of schools in Columbus in 1896.

== See also ==
- Harrison-Gibson House, home of Gibson, also NRHP-listed
