= Springer Opera House =

Venue in Columbus, Georgia, US

- U.S. National Register of Historic Places
- U.S. National Historic Landmark
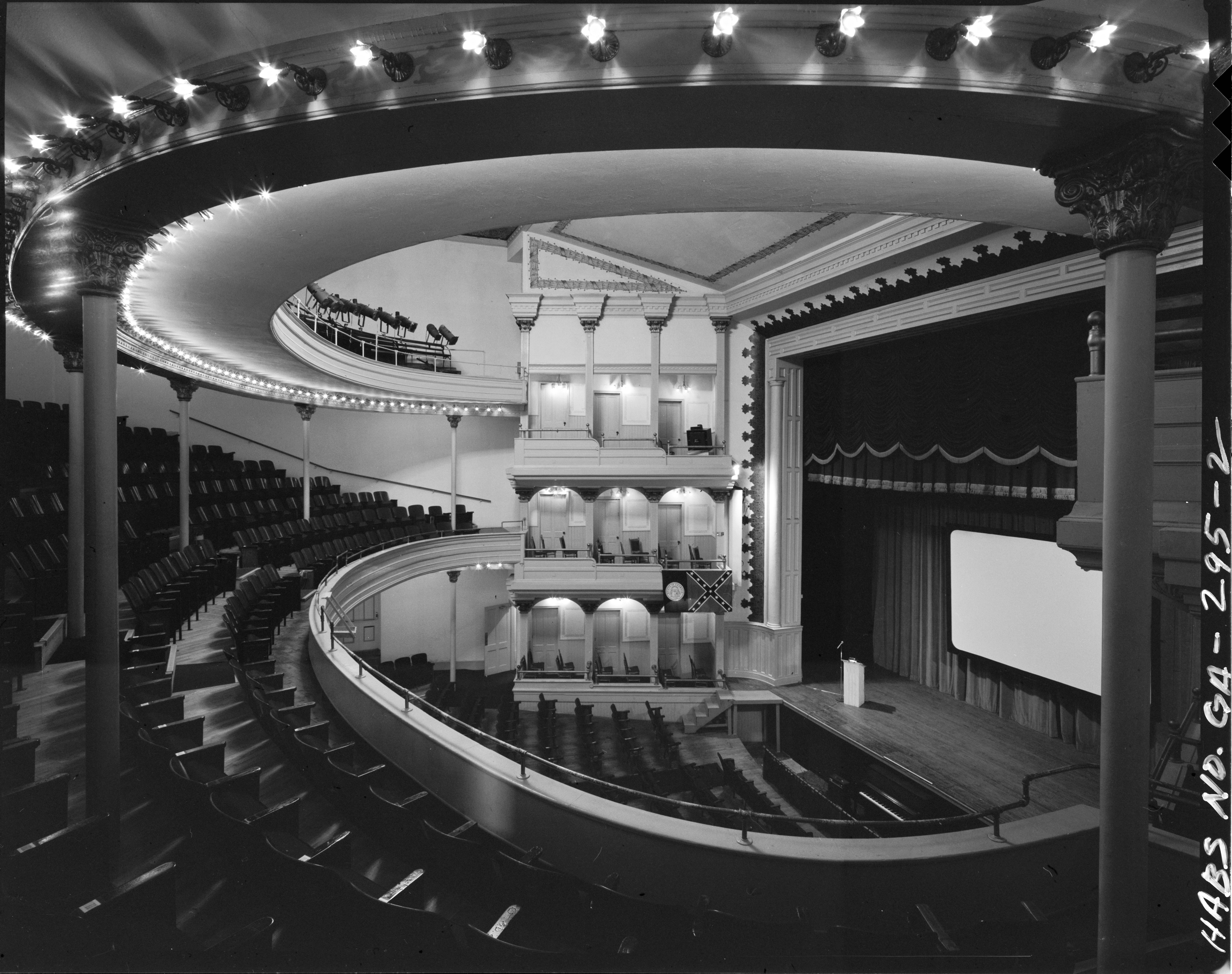
- Interior of the Springer Opera House in 1980

- Location within Georgia Location within the United States
- Location: 103 Tenth St., Columbus, Georgia
- Coordinates: 32.46513°N 84.99134°W
- Built: 1871
- Architect: Foley, Daniel Matthew
- Architectural style: Late Victorian
- NRHP reference No.: 70000214

Significant dates
- Added to NRHP: December 29, 1970
- Designated NHL: June 2, 1978

The Springer Opera House is a historic theater at 103 Tenth Street in Downtown Columbus, Georgia, United States. First opened February 21, 1871, the theater was named the State Theatre of Georgia by Governor Jimmy Carter for its 100th anniversary season, a designation made permanent in 1992 by the [Georgia General Assembly]. In its early days, the Springer hosted legendary performers such as Edwin Booth, Lily Langtry, Oscar Wilde, Will Rogers, Ethel Barrymore, Agnes de Mille and John Philip Sousa. The building was added to the National Register of Historic Places in 1970 and named a National Historic Landmark in 1978.

== History ==
=== Conception ===
Live theatre has had a presence in Columbus, Georgia since the very first year of the city's existence. The first recorded performance in an enclosed theatre building took place during July 1828 in a primitive log structure.. From 1828 to 1870, stages of various size and capability came and went, but all would be considered primitive in comparison to what would follow. On June 19, 1869, just four years after the conclusion of the American Civil War, a meeting was held in the Columbus banking office of John King to establish a Public Hall Association for the purpose of establishing a theatre that the city could be proud of. Under the leadership of King, W. L. Salisbury, W. C. Chipley, L. G. Bowers, Joseph Hanserd, and George P. Swift Sr., the new association quickly raised funds through the selling of stock. The association decided among other things, that the hall would be named for the person holding the largest block of stock. By July 15, less than a month after that initial meeting, more than half of the funds necessary for construction had been raised.

=== F. J. Springer ===
By May 1870, businessman Francis Joseph Springer, an immigrant from Marlenheim, Alsace, France who had become very prosperous in the grocery business, had committed to build the new theater on the site of his centrally located store at the corner of Crawford and Oglethorpe Streets, the present 10th Street and 1st Avenue in downtown Columbus. Springer had long held a love for theatre, music, and dance, and had dreamed of opening a European-style theatre in Columbus. Springer would become the largest shareholder of the Public Hall Association and would further his stake by repaying the remaining stockholders until he held full ownership of the new facility.

=== Construction ===
Construction of the new theater building began immediately and advanced quickly. By August 10, 1870, the Columbus Enquirer newspaper reported that the building was projected to be completed as early as November of the same year. The speedy construction was not without accident, however. Construction worker John Prince suffered a fatal head wound when a scaffold collapsed inside the hall. Construction was delayed for a brief time due to short supply of brick and lumber, but by January 1871 the exterior was substantially complete and work had begun on the interior fresco painting. On February 10, Springer announced the new opera house would open on February 21, its inaugural event a musical benefit concert for the nearby Trinity Episcopal Church.

=== 1900 renovation ===
In 1900, the Springer underwent a major renovation and expansion. Prominent theatre designer J. B. McElfatrick was contracted to completely redesign the Springer. McElfatrick looked to his own work at the Empire Theatre on Broadway in New York City for his design for the Springer. The building was expanded eastward during this renovation, providing a new taller space for the main stage. A second balcony was also added at this time as well as hotel rooms, restaurants and office space. The hotel and restaurants provided the Springer with a valuable new source of revenue.

=== Movie house ===
Not long after the Springer's expansion came the rise in popularity of the motion picture. The Springer, living up to its reputation as a leading theatre of the time, played host to several of Thomas Edison's new Vitascope films. The Springer's display of these short films would signal the start of a slow, steady decline of live theatre in the city. In 1915, the Springer began to show motion pictures on a regular schedule and as motion pictures gained in popularity, live theatre was pushed aside. This was a trend that prevailed throughout the nation during that time. By 1931, the Springer began to operate almost exclusively as a movie house under its new owner, Martin Theatres. The only live performances held at the Springer after 1931 were the occasional local concert. By 1958, decline of Columbus' historic commercial district had taken much of the population away from the downtown area and with attendance continuing a steady decline, Martin Theaters closed the Springer, leaving the aging theatre silent for the first time in its history.

=== 1964 renovation ===
By 1963, the Springer Opera House had been vacant for five years. Its future was now dim and talk of demolishing the structure was stirring. The Springer's location, directly across the street from the busy county courthouse, made it a prime location for a new parking lot or office building.

With the wrecking ball imminent, a group of local actors, already established as the Columbus Little Theater, formed a board of trustees composed of local leaders of varying expertise with a common interest in saving the Springer Opera House. Those trustees began a very aggressive campaign to educate the public about the Springer's significance as a historic structure worth saving. As the awareness campaign blanketed the city, one of the board's trustees, businessman Robert L. Lewis, provided a $5,000 binder for the purchase of the Springer building.

In the summer of 1964, with control of the building secured and sufficient donations in hand to begin renovation, the group began focusing on repairing the leaking roof, restoring the ground floor lobby, cleaning and redressing the main hall, and bringing the building up to code. The Springer Opera House reopened to great celebration on September 23, 1965, with a Columbus Little Theater production of St. Elmo, based on the novel of the same name by Columbus native Augusta Jane Evans. Although the renovations to the Springer that began in 1964 provided only the bare essentials to reopening the Springer, they proved to be a watershed event in its history. This work by the Columbus Little Theater and its board of trustees is also regarded as the spark that led to the highly successful historic preservation movement that the city of Columbus experienced during the second half of the 20th century.

=== 1998 renovation ===
In 1998, a comprehensive foundation-to-roof renovation completed the historic preservation process that began in 1964. This $12 million project included both renovation and restoration components. While the 1964 renovation stabilized, equipped and restored the main theatre, ground floor public spaces and a portion of the second floor, this 1998 project reclaimed the entire third floor and second floor, which had remained in ruins for decades. In addition, the first floor public areas were expanded and the stage house was completely re-equipped with modern rigging, lighting and sound. The general contractor was Phillips Construction Company and the project architect was Hecht Burdeshaw Architects, both of Columbus, Georgia. Historic interior design was directed by Reneau de Beauchamp (Atlanta) with decorative preservation painting provided by Conrad Schmitt Studios (Milwaukee). Theatre consultant was Cape Dixon Associates (Atlanta) and the project manager was Newton Aaron. Major features of this renovation were the application of lavish Bradbury and Bradbury historic wall papers and the restoration of the decorative painting scheme around the tall Springer proscenium arch and the recovery of previously unknown painting designs on the underside of both balconies. Other important aspects of the project were the creation of four classrooms and rehearsal studios and the construction of a large multipurpose community room on an adjacent property, now known as Foley Hall. These two features allowed the Springer to greatly expand its Theatre Academy program and its Studio Theatre and Children's Theatre programs.

=== Live theatre performance ===
Today, the Springer Opera House hosts performances year-round on two stages. Emily Woodruff Hall, the 700-seat main theatre, hosts the popular Mainstage Series which features popular plays and musicals and many of Broadway's most recent releases. The McClure Theatre, the Springer's more intimate space, hosts Studio Series productions of non-commercial titles and new works and Springer Children's Theatre shows which showcase top talent from the Springer Theatre Academy.

=== Springer Theatre Academy ===
The Springer Opera House offers an extensive year-round training program for young actors in what is the largest theatre training program in the southeast. The Dorothy W. McClure Springer Theatre Academy is led by professional actors, directors, theatre teachers, and technicians and has an enrollment of over 1000 students annually. The academy holds classes throughout the school year and offers an eight-week program during the summer. The Springer Education Department books special arts-in-education performances for surrounding school districts in Georgia and Alabama that brings over 15,000 public, private, and homeschool children into the Springer Opera House's doors; many for the first time.

== See also ==
- List of National Historic Landmarks in Georgia (U.S. state)
- National Register of Historic Places listings in Muscogee County, Georgia
