= Walter Hurt Cargill House =

- U.S. National Register of Historic Places
- U.S. Historic district – Contributing property
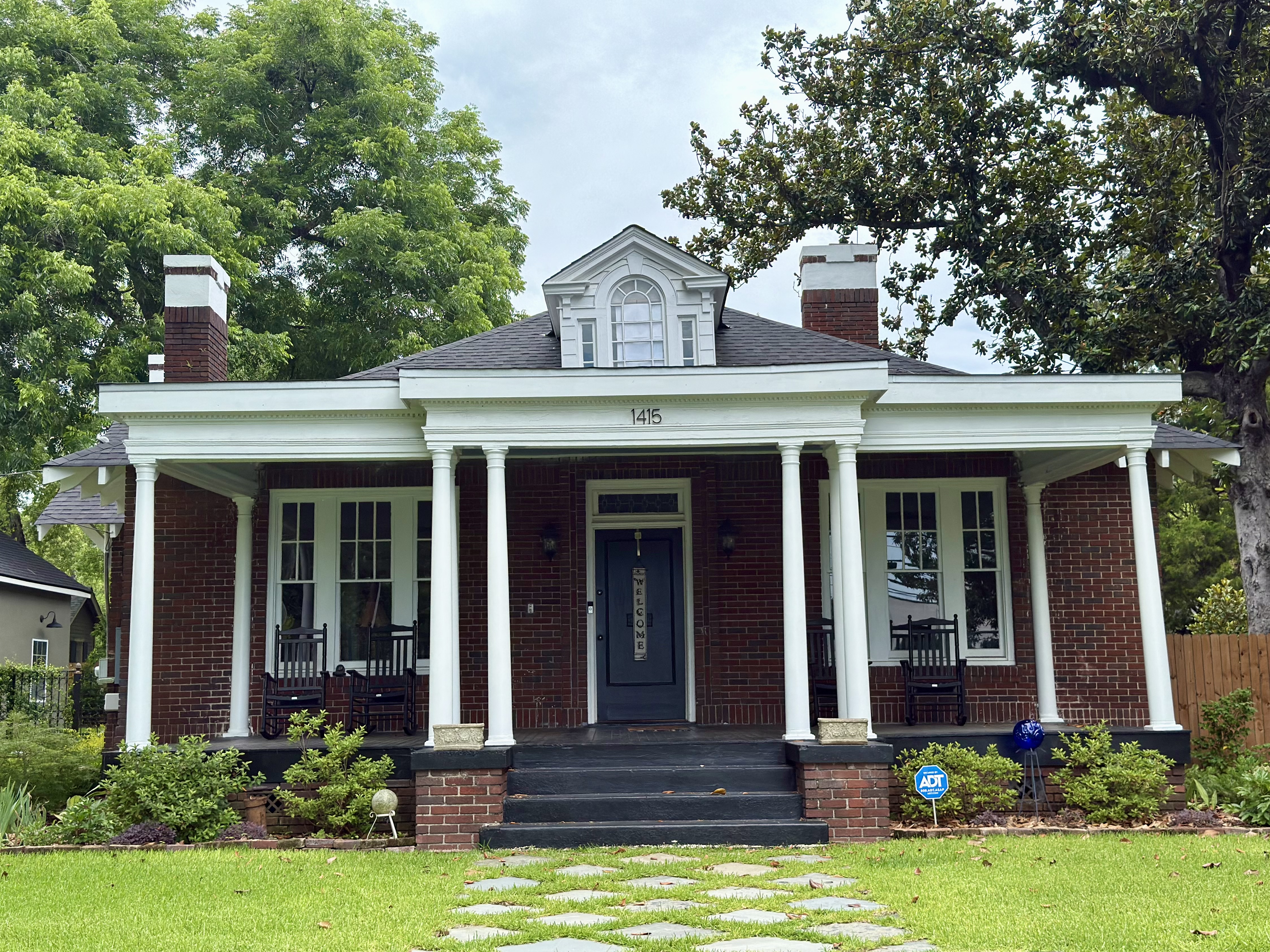
- Walter Hurt Cargill House in 2025

- Location within Georgia
- Location: 1415 3rd Ave. Columbus, Georgia
- Coordinates: 32°28′22″N 84°59′22″W
- Area: less than one acre
- Built: c.1918
- Architectural style: Georgian Revival
- Part of: High Uptown Historic District
- MPS: Columbus MRA
- NRHP reference No.: 80001147
- Added to NRHP: September 29, 1980

The Walter Hurt Cargill House, in Columbus, Georgia, is a Georgian Revival-style house built in about 1918. It was listed on the National Register of Historic Places in 1980.

It is brick, and is a raised one-story cottage. It has a center portico supported by two columns at each end.

It was home of Walter H. and Mamie Cargill. Walter was associated with Hardaway-Cargill Co., a local syrup manufacturing firm.

It is also a contributing building in the High Uptown Historic District.
