= Lion House (Columbus, Georgia) =

Historic house in Georgia, United States

- U.S. National Register of Historic Places
- U.S. Historic district – Contributing property
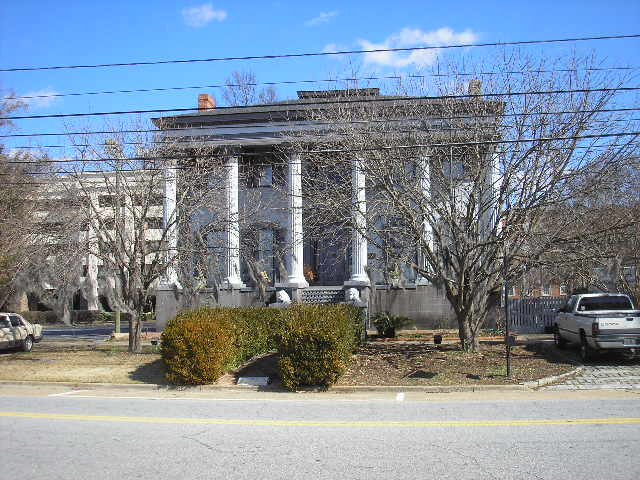
- Lion House (2015)

- Location within Georgia Location within the United States
- Location: 1316 Third Avenue; Columbus, Georgia
- Coordinates: 32°28′16.248″N 84°59′18.8304″W
- Built: c. 1840
- Architect: Stephen D. Button
- Architectural style: Egyptian-Greek Revival
- Part of: High Uptown Historic District (ID04000669)
- NRHP reference No.: 72000391
- Added to NRHP: January 20, 1972

The Lion House, also known as the Hoxey–Cargill House, is a historic building in Columbus, Georgia. The building, located in the High Uptown Historic District, was built in the 1840s and was added to the National Register of Historic Places in 1972.

== History ==
The building was constructed sometime in the 1840s for Dr. Thomas Hoxey, a local physician, with Stephen D. Button of Philadelphia serving as the building's architect. The name "Lion House" comes from the two statues of Nubian lions near the building's front entrance. The architectural style of the building is considered Greek Revival with Egyptian influences. The basement of the building housed the entrance to a now closed-in secret tunnel, which is believed to have led to either the Chattahoochee River or an old hotel in the area. During the American Civil War, it is speculated that mules were hidden in the tunnel. In March 1934, the building was documented as part of the Historic American Buildings Survey.

During World War II, many historic houses in the area were either demolished or converted to commercial properties, and around this time the Lion House was converted to an office building. After this, the building was divided into nine apartments, and by the early 1980s the building was a location for prostitution, serving as a "trick house." A 1980 article in the Ledger-Enquirer described how the building had decayed, stating, "The grandeur of [the Lion House’s] entrance is mocked… by abandoned appliances, occasional "rent due" notices and a chandelier with only a few light bulbs." In October 1986, a fire destroyed the building's roof and severely damaged the top floor. In total, the fire caused approximately $90,000 in damages. Shortly after this, the building was donated to the Historic Columbus Foundation, which began repairing the property the following year. In February 1995, the building was sold to a private owner who restored the building to its current condition. Today, tours are given of the building.

On January 20, 1972, the building was added to the National Register of Historic Places. It is also a contributing property to the NRHP-listed High Uptown Historic District.

== See also ==
- National Register of Historic Places listings in Muscogee County, Georgia
