= Swift-Kyle House =

Historic house in Georgia, United States

- U.S. National Register of Historic Places
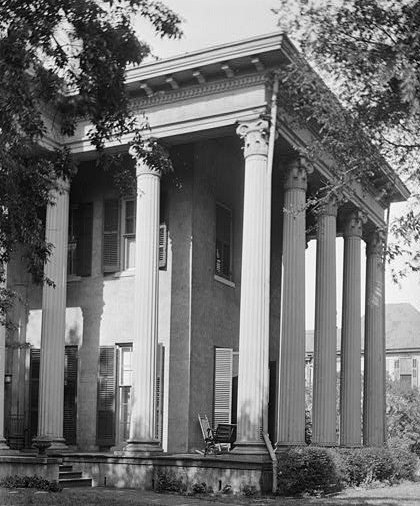
- Swift-Kyle House from the Historic American Buildings Survey

- Location within Georgia Location within the United States
- Location: 303 12th St., Columbus, Georgia
- Coordinates: 32°28′9″N 84°59′20″W
- Area: 0.1 acres (0.040 ha)
- Built: 1857
- Architectural style: Greek Revival
- NRHP reference No.: 73000635
- Added to NRHP: April 11, 1973

Swift-Kyle House, also known as the Swift Mansion and Billings House, is a historic residence in Columbus, Georgia. It was added to the National Register of Historic Places on April 11, 1973. It is located at 303 12th Street and 3rd Avenue. George Parker Swift and his daughter and son-in-law owned the mansion which dates from the antebellum period. It dates to 1857 and was remodeled after a roof fire in 1898 Adelaide and Hames P. Kyle also owned the home. It was a residence until 1956 and has also been used by the Columbus Travel Bureau.

== See also ==
- National Register of Historic Places listings in Muscogee County, Georgia
