= Flowers Building =

- U.S. National Register of Historic Places
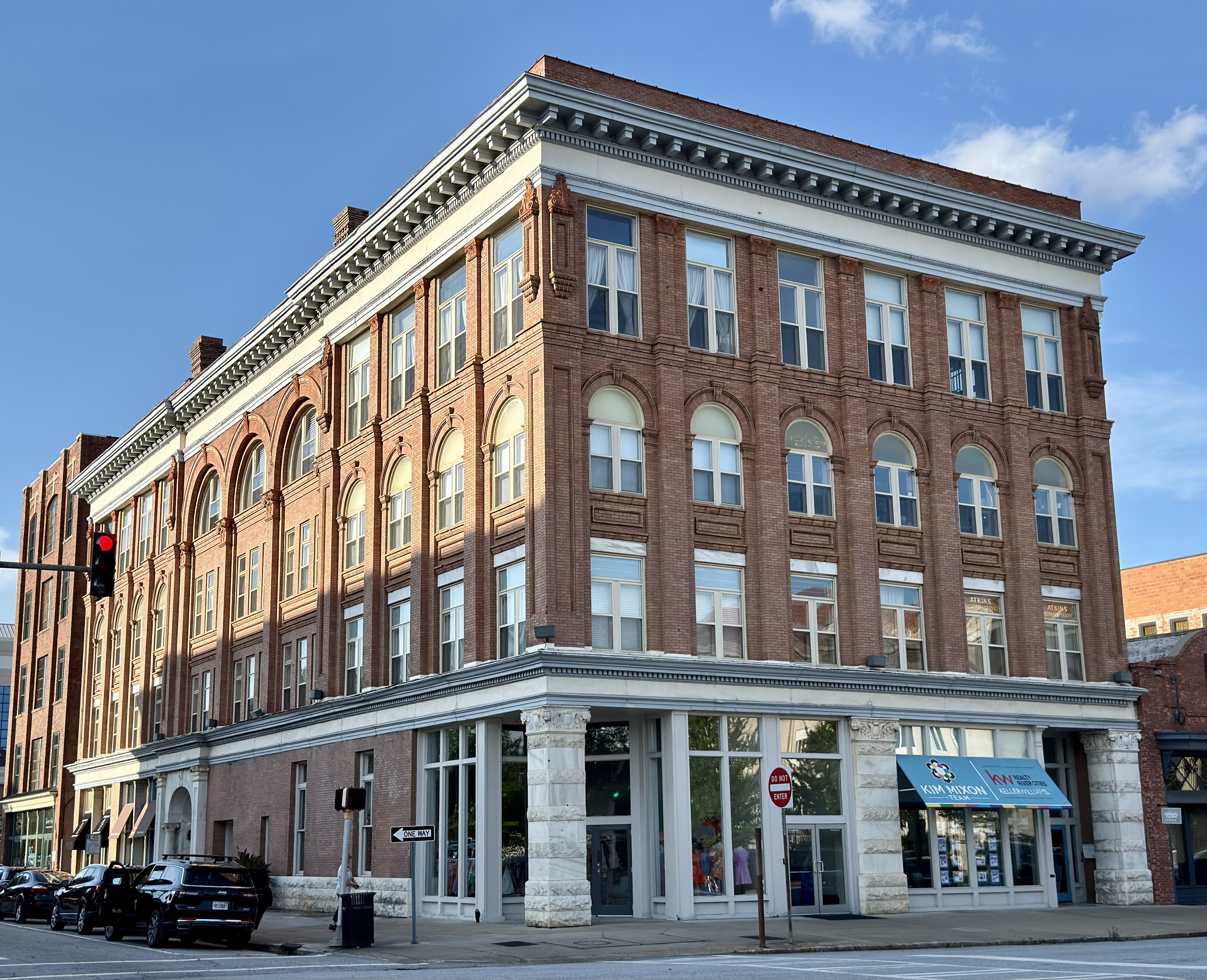
- The building in 2025

- Location within Georgia Location within the United States
- Location: 101 12th St. Columbus, Georgia
- Coordinates: 32°28′07″N 84°59′30″W
- Area: less than one acre
- Built: 1902
- Architect: T. Firth Lockwood
- Architectural style: Chicago
- MPS: Columbus MRA
- NRHP reference No.: 80001156
- Added to NRHP: September 29, 1980

The Flowers Building is a historic building constructed in 1902 in Columbus, Georgia. Its Chicago style design is by architect T. Firth Lockwood. It was listed on the National Register of Historic Places in 1980.

It is a four-story Chicago school-style commercial building.

The building was deemed significant "as a turn-of-the-century Masonic Temple, which later became a major commercial center in downtown Columbus, housing offices of leading professionals and businessmen", and as "the only example of the Chicago Commercial building in town. It is Sullivanesque in the use of the tall vertical pilasters and over all upward thrust of the facades. It also shows some influence of John Wellborn Root in its Romanesque detailing, such as the granite piers on the first floor, the rounded arches on the 3rd floor, and the heavy cornice on the parapet."

The building was constructed in 1902 as meeting hall for local Masonic lodges (with commercial retail and office space rented on the floors not occupied by the Masons). The Masons sold the building to a Mr. Flowers in 1940 and moved to the Columbus Masonic Center, 1127 2nd Ave, Columbus, GA . Under his ownership it was used as an office building. Miller & Gallman Developers later converted it into an apartment complex.

Columbian Lodge (as an organization) was chartered in 1828.
