= Octagon House (Columbus, Georgia) =

House listed as US National Landmark in Columbus, Georgia, US

- U.S. National Register of Historic Places
- U.S. National Historic Landmark
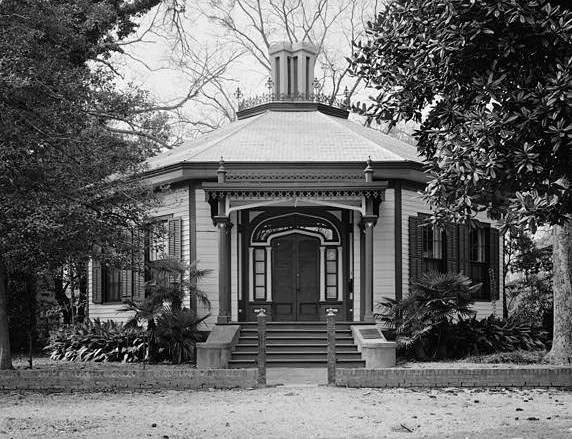
- May's Folly

- Location within Georgia Location within the United States
- Location: 527 1st Ave., Columbus, Georgia
- Coordinates: 32.4563°N 84.99217°W
- Built: 1829
- Architectural style: Octagon Mode
- NRHP reference No.: 69000049

Significant dates
- Added to NRHP: July 29, 1969
- Designated NHL: November 7, 1973

The Octagon House, also known as May's Folly, is a historic octagon house at 527 1st Avenue in Columbus, Georgia. Built about 1830 and enlarged in 1863, it is claimed by the local historical society to be the nation's only known example of a double-octagon house. It was declared a National Historic Landmark in 1973.

== Description and history ==
May's Folly is located in central Columbus, on the west side of 1st Avenue between 5th and 6th Streets. It is a single-story wood-frame structure, consisting of a front octagonal section and a rear rectangular one. The front section is topped by an octagonal roof with a cupola at the center, and the walls are sheathed in clapboards. The front entrance is sheltered by an elaborate Gothic Revival portico. The interior of this section has the basic form of a Greek cross built around a central chimney, with the angled sections filled with triangular closets and vestibules. The rear of the house, which is its older section, is rectangular, but architectural investigation of the structure has uncovered evidence that it was also at one time octagonal in shape, and was probably made rectangular at the time the front section was built.

The older rear portion of the house was built about 1830, and was until 1852 home to Alfred Iverson, Sr., a United States senator. In 1863 the house was purchased by Leander May, a cabinetmaker who is credited with construction of the main octagonal structure. May sold the house in 1865, and it passed through a succession of hands before becoming in 1967 the first real estate acquisition of Historic Columbus, a local historic preservation organization. It is now in private hands.

== See also ==
- List of octagon houses
- List of National Historic Landmarks in Georgia (U.S. state)
- National Register of Historic Places listings in Muscogee County, Georgia
