= Pemberton House (Columbus, Georgia) =

Historic house in Georgia, United States

- U.S. National Register of Historic Places
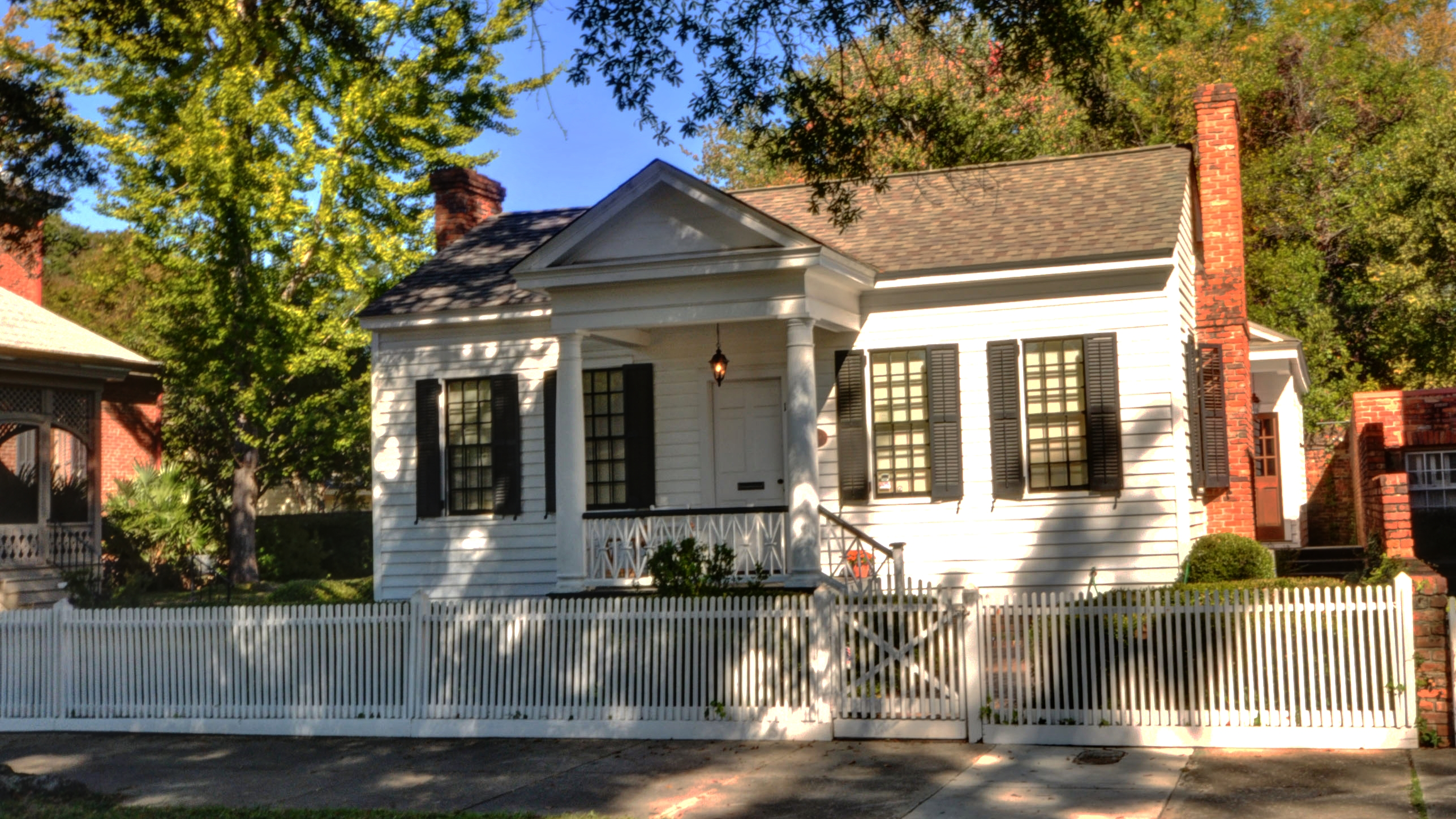

- Location within Georgia Location within the United States
- Location: 11 7th St., Columbus, Georgia
- Coordinates: 32°27′33″N 84°59′34″W
- Area: 0.1 acres (0.040 ha)
- Built: 1855
- Architectural style: Victorian architecture
- NRHP reference No.: 71000283
- Added to NRHP: September 28, 1971

The Pemberton House is a historic house in Columbus, Georgia.

== Location ==
It is located at 11 7th Street in Columbus, Georgia.

== Overview ==
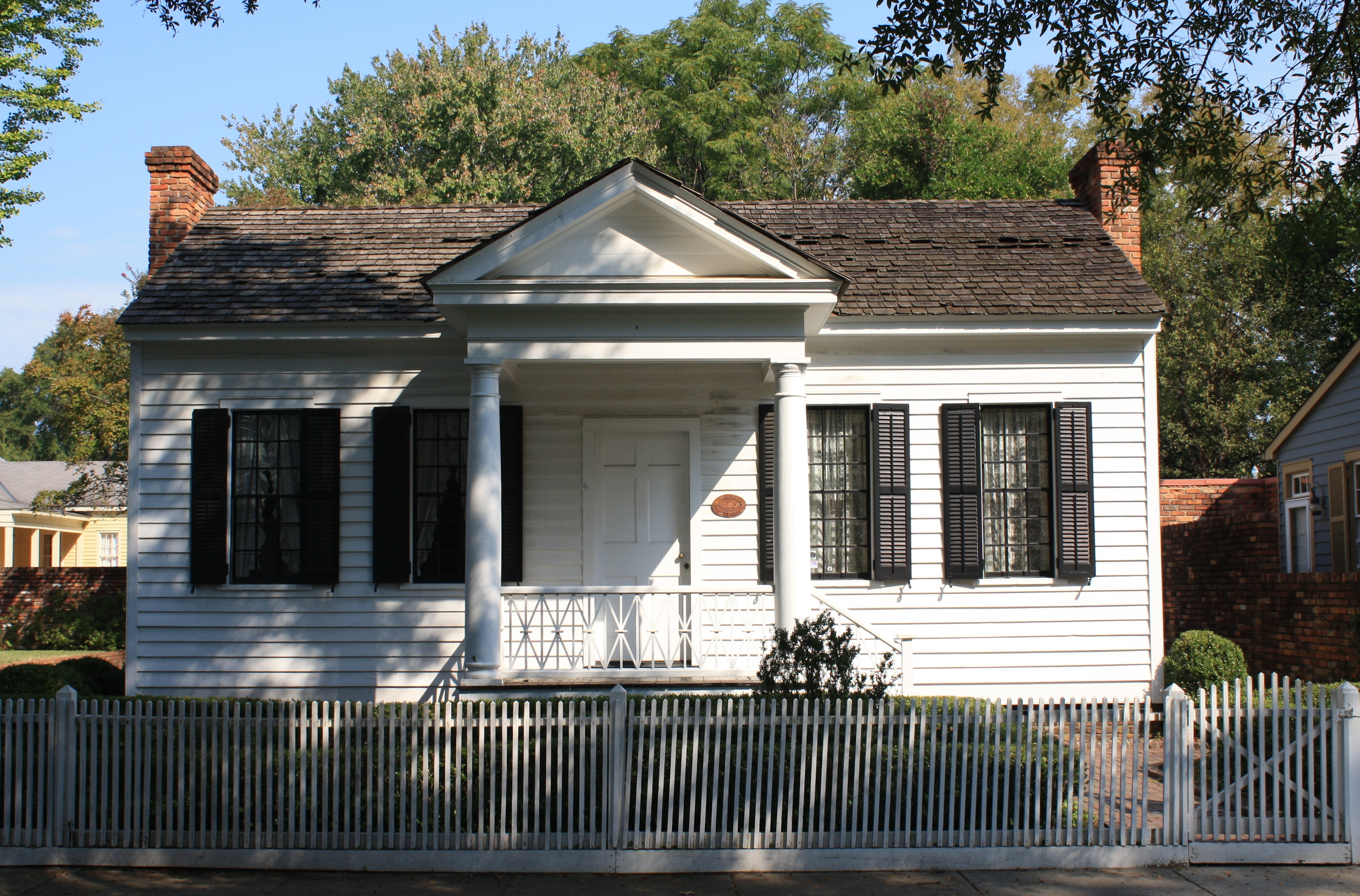
Front view of the house.

It was the private residence of John Pemberton (1831–1888), the inventor of Coca-Cola. It is a Victorian cottage, and it has been moved to this new location and restored.

It is now a private residence and cannot be toured. The house has been listed on the National Register of Historic Places since September 28, 1971.
