= Rankin House (Columbus, Georgia) =

Historic house in Georgia, United States

- U.S. National Register of Historic Places
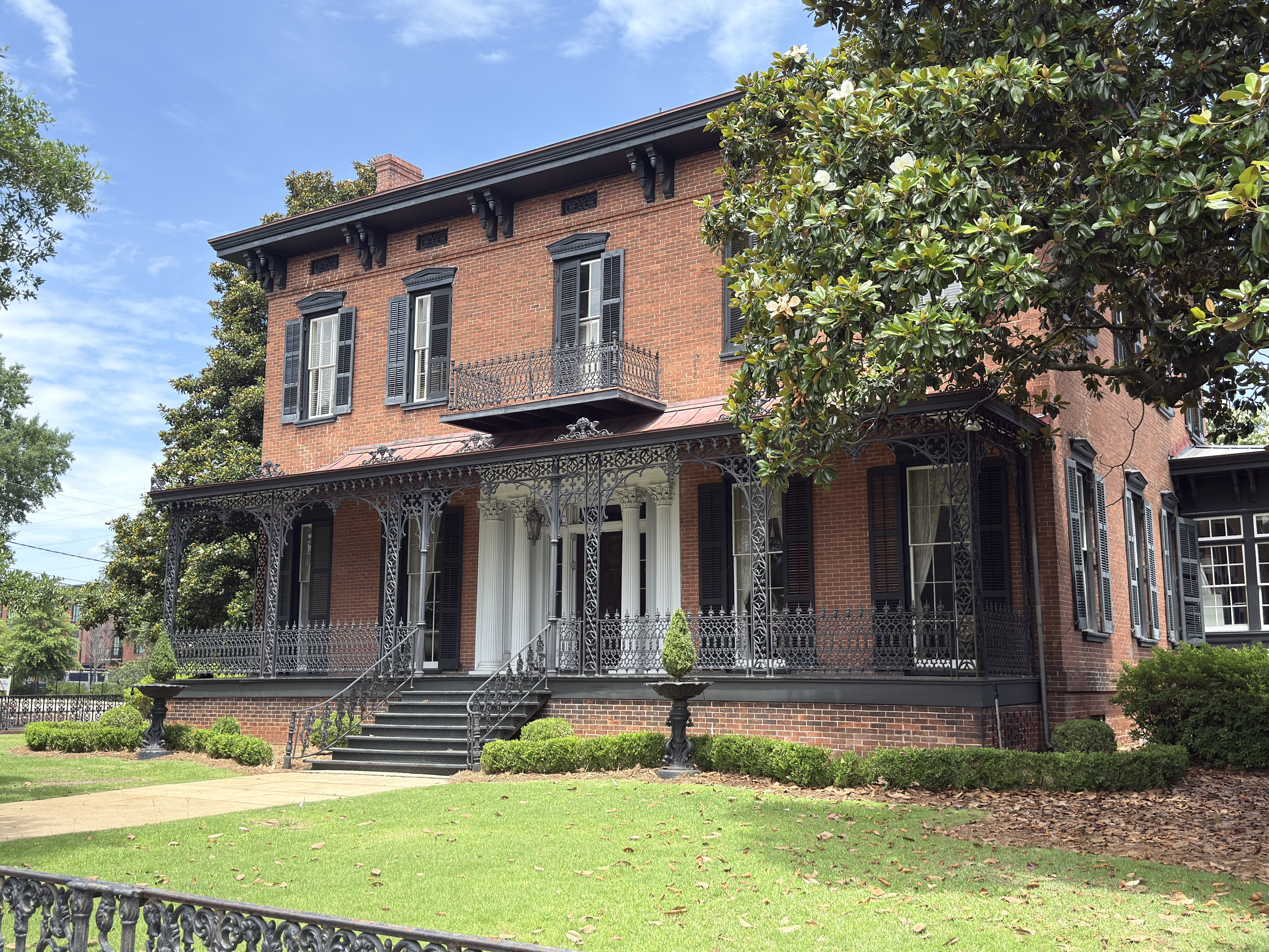
- The house in 2025

- Location within Georgia Location within the United States
- Interactive map showing the location of Rankin House
- Location: 1440 Second Avenue; Columbus, Georgia
- Coordinates: 32°28′26″N 84°59′24″W
- Built: 1867
- NRHP reference No.: 72000393
- Added to NRHP: March 16, 1972

Rankin House is a historic residence in Columbus, Georgia. It was added to the National Register of Historic Places on March 16, 1972. It is located at 1440 2nd Avenue. It is now home to a museum on the first floor and the Historic Columbus Foundation on the upper floor. The home was built for James Rankin, a planter and owner of The Rankin Hotel who came to Columbus from Ayrshire, Scotland. Construction of the home was interrupted by the American Civil War.

The home includes iron grillwork, pine floors, marble mantels and a walnut double stairway. Period gaslight chandeliers are a highlight of the museum rooms. The music room boasts a rosewood piano of concert quality; a picture of Mr. Rankin, the home's original owner; and a Rankin family petticoat table and ornate gilt mirror. A piano forte is displayed in the south parlor.

The home includes a utility staircase used by servants. It was an expensive home. The property's fencing is from the Broadway townhouse of General Henry Lewis Benning, the Confederate war hero for whom Fort Benning is named.

== See also ==
- National Register of Historic Places listings in Muscogee County, Georgia
