= Building at 1519 3rd Avenue =

- U.S. National Register of Historic Places
- Location within Georgia
- Location: 1519 3rd Ave., Columbus, Georgia
- Coordinates: 32°28′30″N 84°59′21″W
- Area: less than one acre
- Built: c.1908-10
- MPS: Columbus MRA
- NRHP reference No.: 80001126
- Added to NRHP: December 2, 1980

The Building at 1519 3rd Avenue in Columbus, Georgia was built c.1908-10. It was listed on the National Register of Historic Places in 1980.

It is a two-story "large sprawling house with no distinguishable architectural style", with a two-story bay and a hipped roof with a dormer centered over its front entrance.

It is located in what was once Columbus's elite "High Uptown" neighborhood, and was deemed "significant as it was the home of John Bleecker who was general manager of Columbus Railroad Company shortly after the turn of the century". It was later home of Robert E. Dismukes, president of the Home Building and Savings Association.

Its National Register listing was within a batch of numerous Columbus properties determined to be eligible consistent with a 1980 study of historic resources in Columbus.
