= City Fire Department (Columbus, Georgia) =

- U.S. National Register of Historic Places
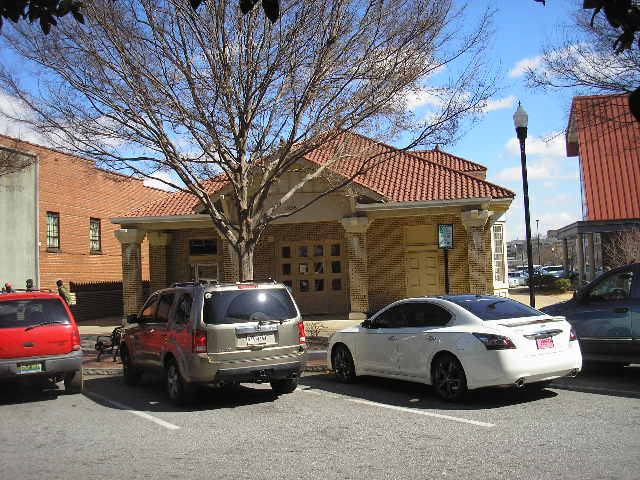

- Location within Georgia
- Location: 1338 and 1340 Broadway, Columbus, Georgia
- Coordinates: 32°28′19″N 84°59′35″W
- Area: 0.1 acres (0.040 ha)
- Built: 1920
- Architectural style: Bungalow/craftsman
- MPS: Columbus MRA
- NRHP reference No.: 80001153
- Added to NRHP: September 29, 1980

The City Fire Department in Columbus, Georgia, at 1338 and 1340 Broadway, is a former fire station which was built in 1920. It was listed on the National Register of Historic Places in 1980.

It is Bungalow in style.
