= Columbus Ironworks =

- U.S. National Register of Historic Places
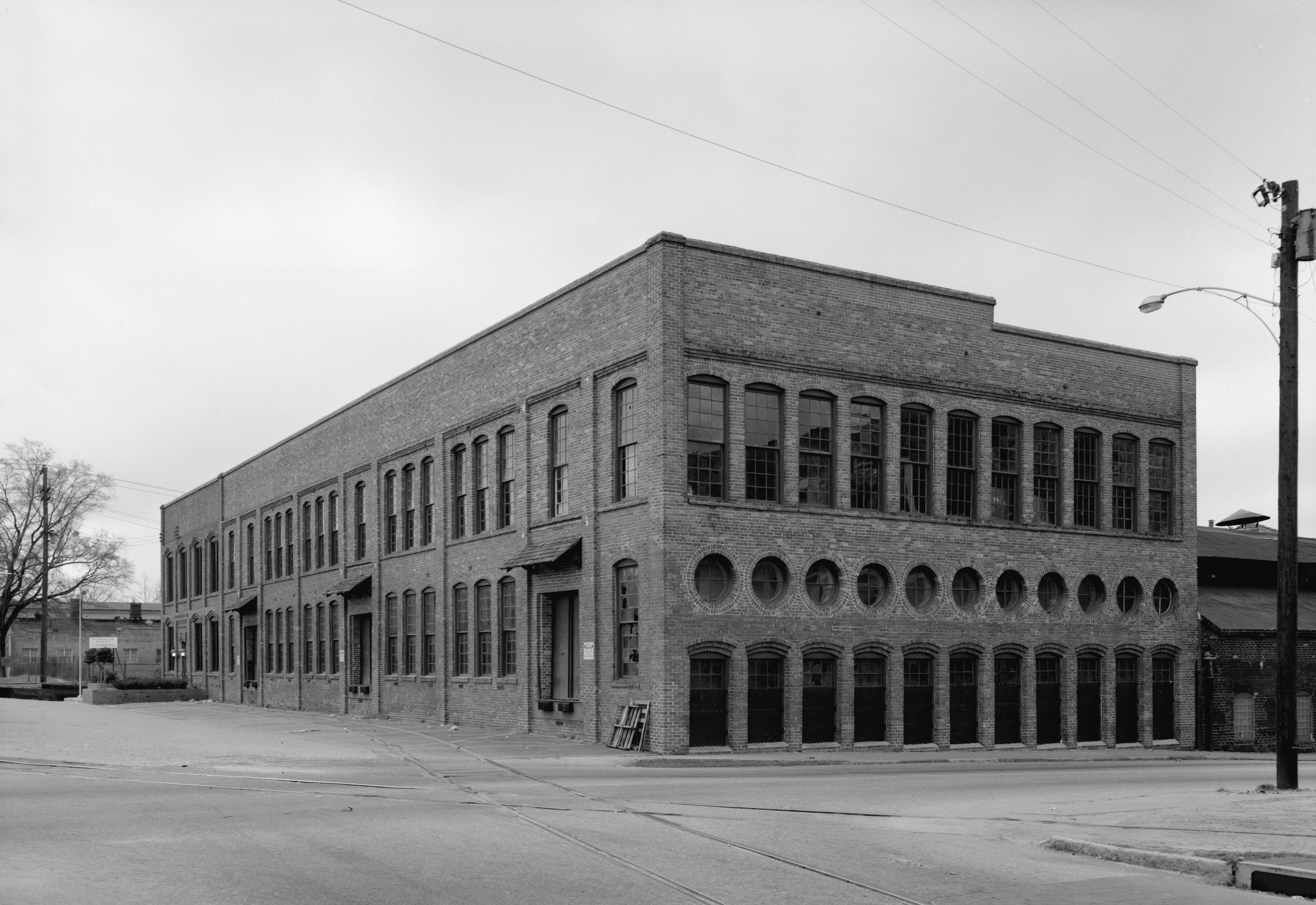
- Columbus Ironworks

- Location within Georgia Location within the United States
- Location: 901 Front Avenue, Columbus, Georgia
- Coordinates: 32°27′47″N 84°59′43″W
- Built: 1853
- Website: http://www.conventiontradecenter.com/
- NRHP reference No.: 69000046
- Added to NRHP: July 29, 1969

The Columbus Ironworks (also known as the Columbus Georgia Convention & Trade Center) was built in 1853. It was listed on the U.S. National Register of Historic Places in 1969. During the Civil War, the industrial plant produced weapons for the Confederate army. These weapons included cannons, pistols, rifles, and swords.

Today, it is used as an event center. Recurring events include local high school dances or dinners, Christmas in the South (a three-day Christmas sale), NerdaCon and concerts. In addition to hosting events, the center displays artifacts and factoids from its days as a factory.

Columbus Ironworks today
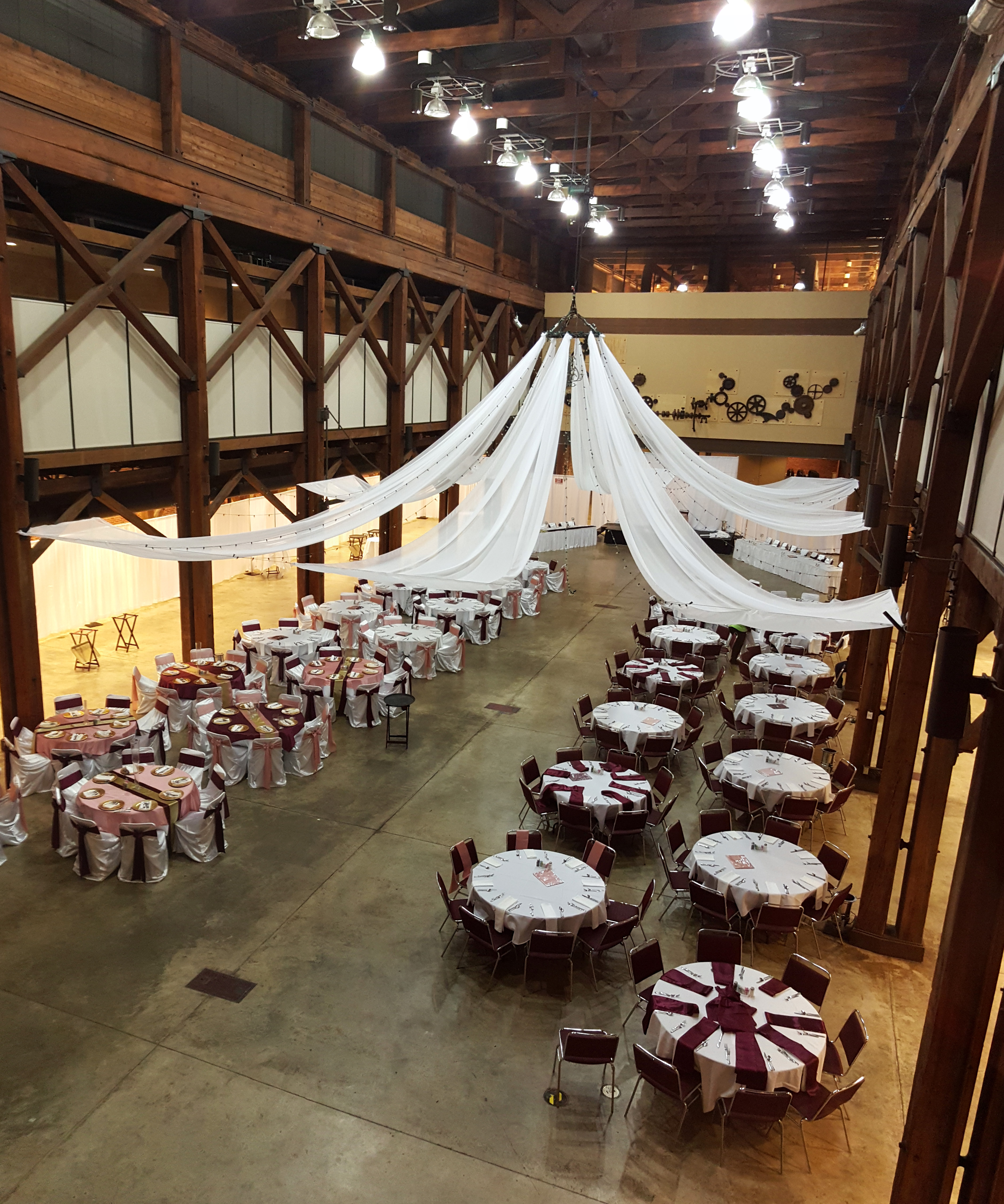
The North Hall of the Ironworks in 2015, decorated for a wedding

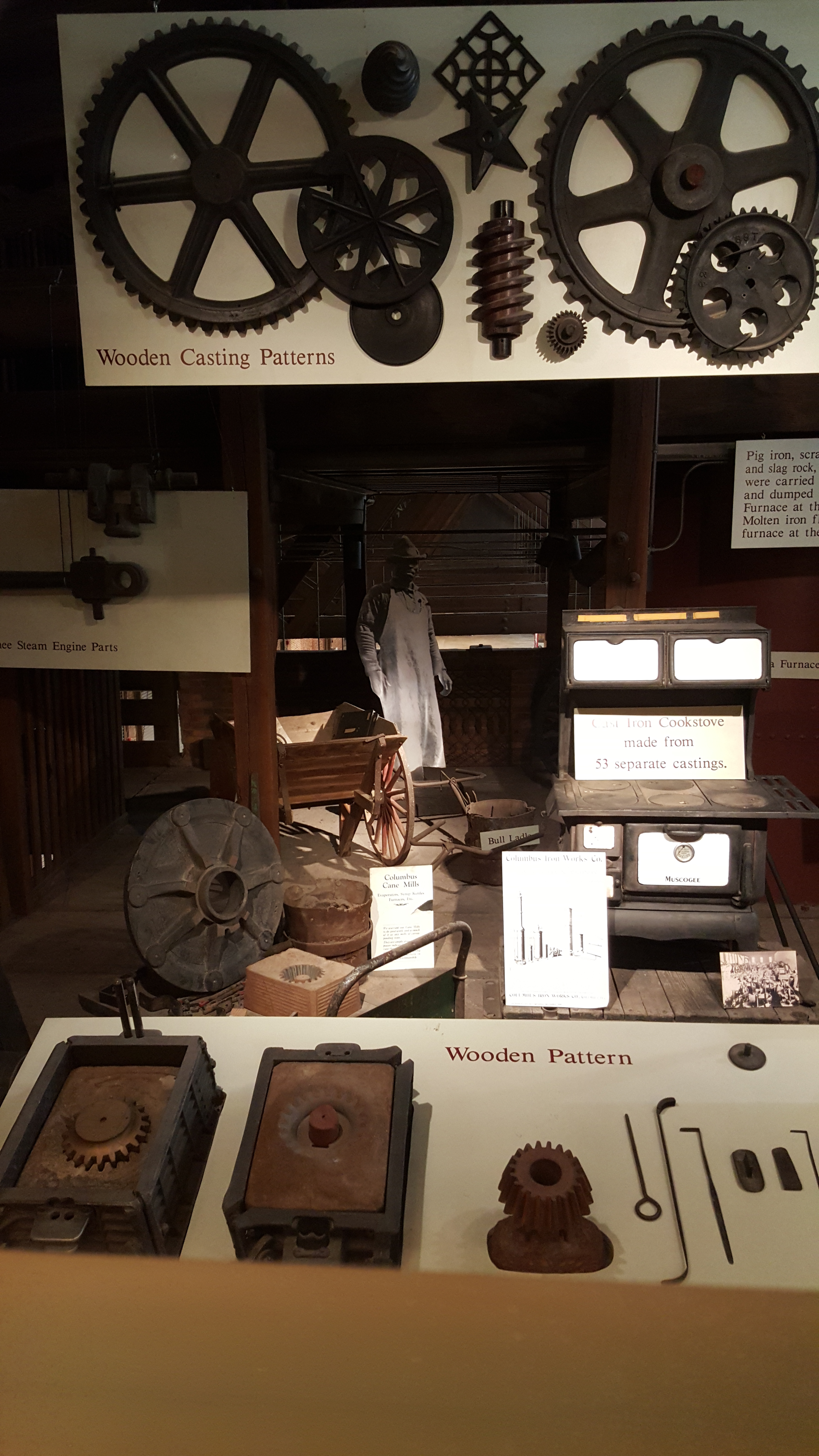
Miscellaneous artifacts from the Ironworks' heyday

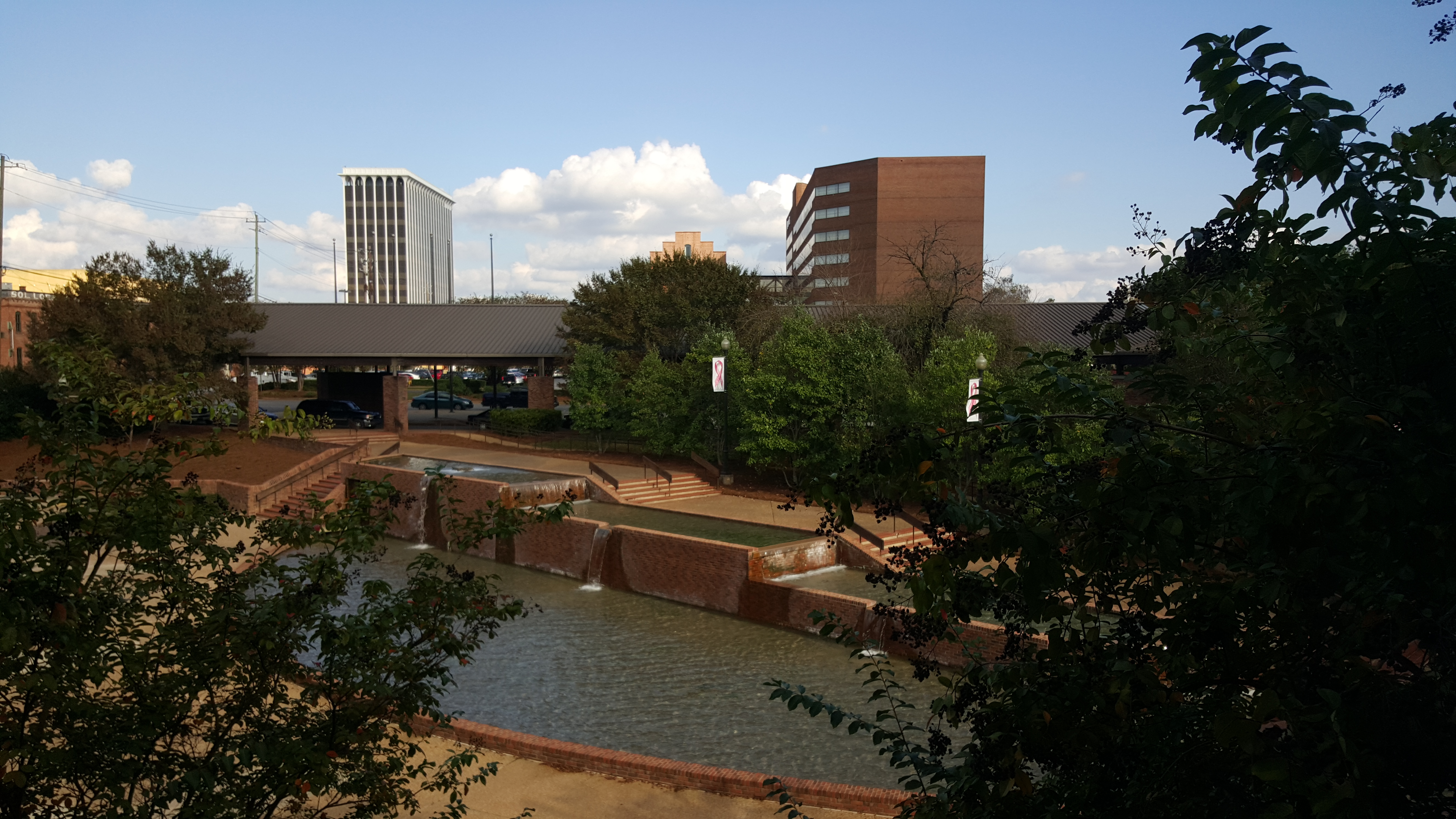
The courtyard of the Ironworks

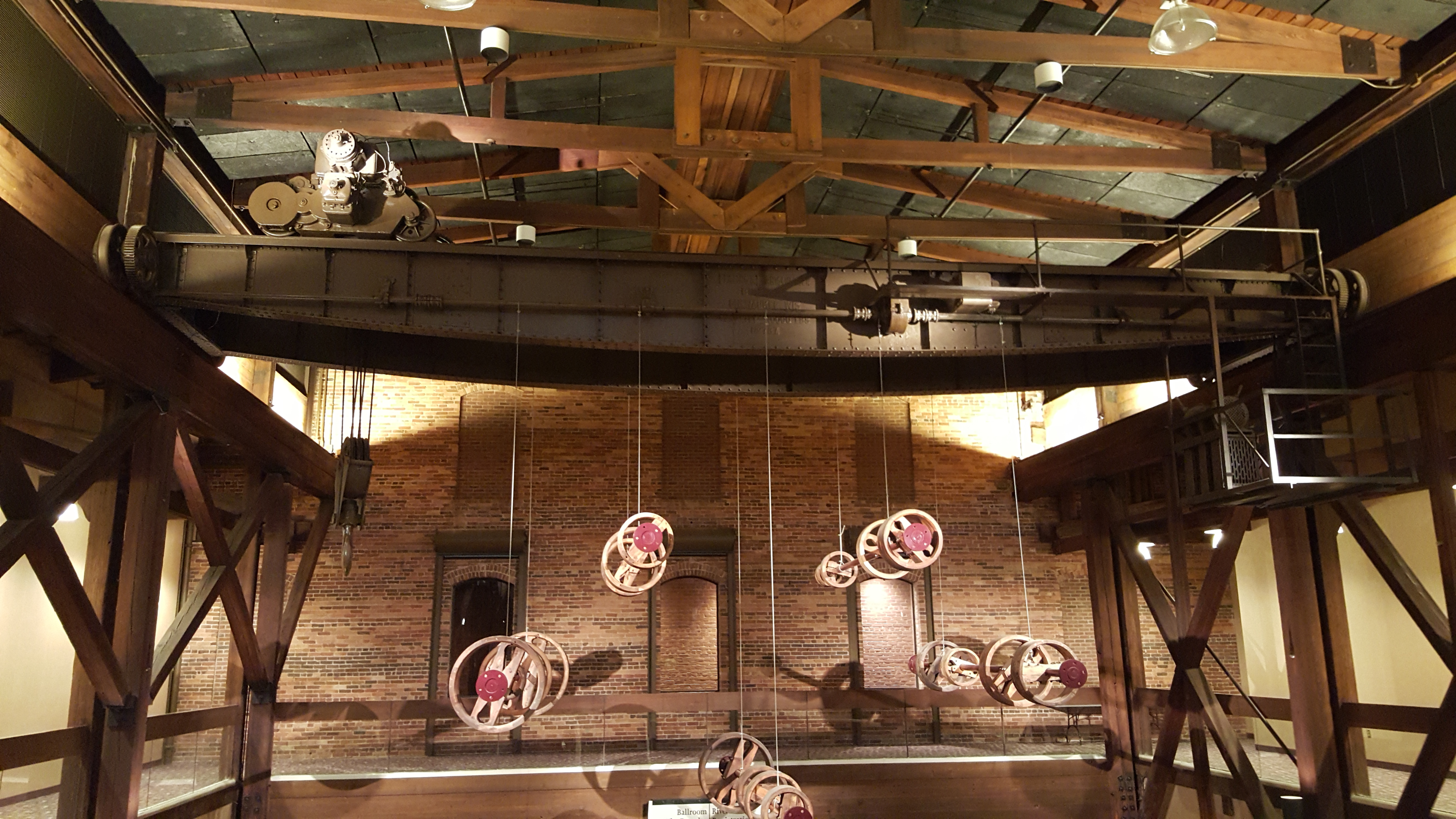
A crane kept from when the Ironworks was a factory
