= Huntsville-class ironclad =

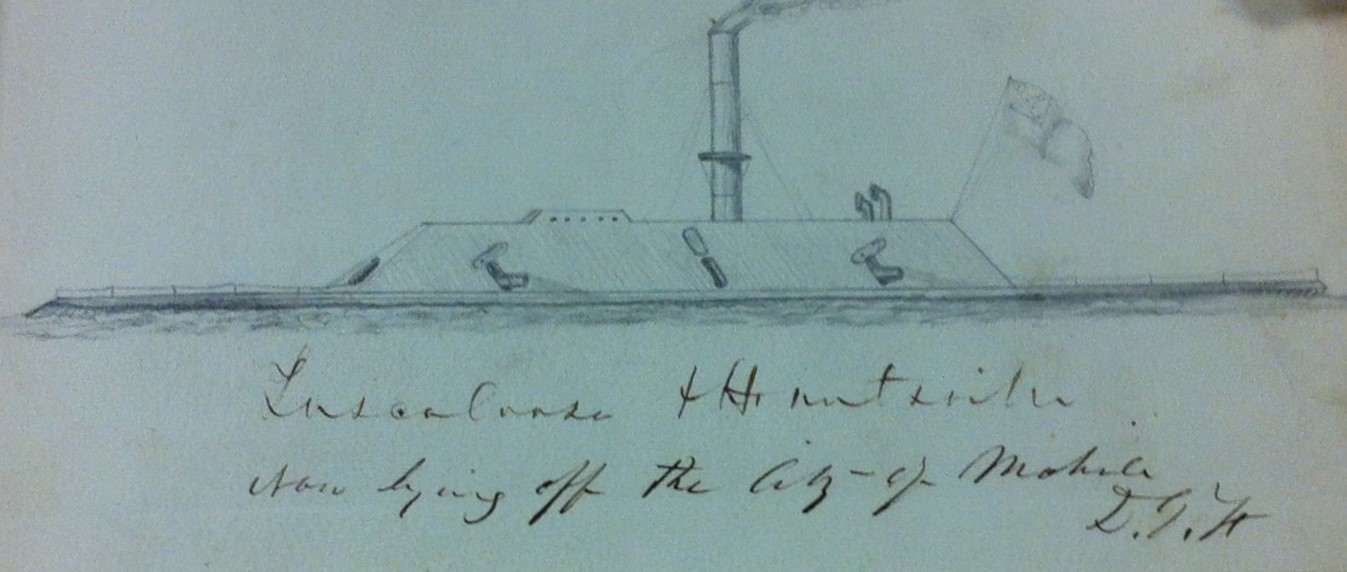
- Sketch of Huntsville, Mobile, Alabama, 1864

Class overview
- Name: Huntsville-class ironclad
- Builders: Henry D. Basset, Selma, Alabama
- Operators: (Confederate States of America) Confederate States Navy
- Built: 1862–1863
- In service: 1863–1865
- Completed: 2
- Lost: 2

General characteristics
- Type: Casemate ironclad
- Tonnage: 500
- Length: 152 ft (46 m) (o/a)
- Beam: 34 or 43.5 ft (10.4 or 13.3 m)
- Draft: 7 to 9 ft (2.1 to 2.7 m)
- Installed power: 1 or 2 × propellers
- Propulsion: 2 × Steam engines
- Speed: 2.5 knots (4.6 km/h; 2.9 mph)
- Complement: 40 or 120 officers and enlisted men
- Armament: 1 × 6.4 in (163 mm) Brooke rifle; 3 × 32-pdr smoothbore guns
- Armor: 4 in (102 mm)

The Huntsville-class ironclads consisted of two casemate ironclads ordered by the Confederate States Navy in 1862 to defend Mobile, Alabama, during the American Civil War. Completed the following year, they used propulsion machinery taken from steamboats, and were intended to be armored with 4 inches (102 mm) of wrought iron and armed with four cannons. Both CSS (Note: Confederate States Ship) Tuscaloosa and her sister ship CSS Huntsville were found to be too slow for practical use, and were relegated to service as floating batteries. Union forces captured Mobile in April 1865, and the sisters were scuttled on April 12, as they were unable to escape due to an inability to steam against the current on the Spanish River.

CSS Tuscaloosa was an ironclad warship that served in the Confederate States Navy during the American Civil War. Construction began in May 1862, under a contract with Henry D. Bassett. Her engines were taken from the steamboat Chewala, and she was armored with 4 inches (10 cm) of iron and armed with four cannons. In January 1863, she was launched, and traveled down to Mobile, Alabama for service on Mobile Bay. Both Tuscaloosa and her sister ship CSS Huntsville were found to be too slow for practical use, and were relegated to service as floating batteries. Union forces captured Mobile in April 1865, and Tuscaloosa was scuttled on April 12, as she was unable to escape due to an inability to steam against the current on the Spanish River. Her wreck was discovered in the 1980s.

== Background and description ==
During the American Civil War, the Confederate States Navy determined that it was unable to keep up with the Union Navy's ability to produce traditional warships, and eventually decided to emphasize construction of ironclad warships. Before the war, Mobile, Alabama, had been the second-most important trading port on the Gulf of Mexico, and gained greater importance to the Confederacy after the fall of New Orleans in early 1862. The city lay on the northern edge of Mobile Bay, which opened into the Gulf of Mexico. In December 1861, the state government of Alabama had purchased a cotton lighter and converted her into the ironclad CSS Baltic, transferring her to the Confederate government in May 1862. However, Baltic was a decrepit and ineffective vessel.

For further defense of the Mobile area, the Confederate States Department of the Navy contracted for two additional ironclads earmarked for Mobile to be built at Selma, Alabama. (Note: A total of four ironclads were laid down at Selma.) The contract for the construction of Tuscaloosa was given to Henry D. Bassett, and work on the ironclad began in May 1862. The contract, in the amount of $100,000, called for the vessel to be completed by July 1, 1862, and iron armor, cannon, and boilers were intended to be supplied by a developing foundry at Selma. This time frame was not met. Tuscaloosa and her sister ship CSS Huntsville are considered to be Huntsville-class ironclads, which was an improved version of the design used for the ironclad CSS Albemarle. Confederate naval constructor John L. Porter created an alternate design of ironclad known as the "diamond hull". In order to simply construction, the diamond hull ironclads had minimal curvature in their hulls, creating a hull shape whose cross-section resembled a hexagon. Porter is usually given credit for planning Huntsville and Tuscaloosa, but naval historian Saxon Bisbee suggests that someone else designed the two vessels, as they were substantially different from Porter's other diamond hull designs, and incorporate elements of riverboat design that Porter's other designs do not.

No ship plans for Tuscaloosa are known to exist, but the Port Columbus Civil War Naval Center preserves a draft plan for a vessel believed to be a sister ship of Tuscaloosa that was never completed. The Port Columbus draft shows a vessel that would have had dimensions of about 160 feet (49 m) long between perpendiculars, a beam of 43.5 feet (13.3 m), a depth of hold of 10.5 feet (3.2 m), and a draft of about 9 feet (2.7 m); Bisbee states that these figures are approximately what contemporary sources suggest Tuscaloosa's size was. Naval historian Paul H. Silverstone states that she was 152 feet (46 m) long overall, with a beam of 34 feet (10 m), and a draft of 7 feet (2.1 m). The Dictionary of American Naval Fighting Ships (DANFS) agrees with Silverstone's figures for length and beam, and with Bisbee's 10.5-foot depth of hold, but gives draft as 8 feet (2.4 m).

It was originally expected that the Columbus Naval Iron Works would produce custom-built machinery for Tuscaloosa, but this was not possible due to lack of time and shortage of machinery. Instead, engines were taken from the steamboat Chewala for use in Tuscaloosa. Modifications to allow Chewala's engines to work for Tuscaloosa was done by William Penny & Company, a branch of the Columbus Naval Iron Works in Prattville, Alabama. Her boilers were fitted and repaired by the Columbus Naval Iron Works. Tuscaloosa was equipped with two engines, but it is not known how many boilers she had. Chewala had been a sternwheel steamer, but Tuscaloosa was a screw steamer, requiring a system of gears to transfer the power to the screws. The machinery was installed by January 1863. Bisbee states that she had two screws, while Silverstone says she had only one.

Tuscaloosa's armor was 4 inches (10 cm) thick. The new foundry in Selma had come to naught, and pig iron was scarce, making armored plate hard to come by. Tuscaloosa received her iron plate in December 1862 and January 1863, it was produced by the firm of Scofield & Markham in Atlanta, Georgia. She was armed with three 32-pounder guns and a 6.4-inch rifled cannon; the rifled piece was a Brooke rifle. The DANFS states that she had a crew of 120, while naval historian W. Craig Gaines places her crew at 40. The ship's crew found conditions aboard so bad that they slept on shore in a cotton warehouse for part of the year.

== History ==
Tuscaloosa was launched at Selma on February 7, 1863. She steamed to Mobile under her own power, where she was fitted out. Admiral Franklin Buchanan supervised her trial runs. The trials began in April, and found that she was too slow and that her boilers leaked. Another attempt at using coal, which was in limited supply, instead of wood and installing forced draft fans to improve ventilation and speed did not lead to substantially better results. Tuscaloosa could only go about 2.5 knots (4.6 km/h; 2.9 mph), which was barely faster than the current in Mobile Bay. Buchanan reported that the ship's machinery worked well, and Bisbee attributes most of the speed problems to the nonstandard hull.

Bisbee notes that Tuscaloosa was "a failure as a self-propelled vessel". Huntsville also had a limited ability to move under its own power, so the two vessels were relegated to use as floating batteries. The two vessels were unfit for naval combat in open water. Tuscaloosa was captained by Commander C. H. McBlair. By early 1864, the Confederates were expecting a Union attack on Mobile Bay. In mid-February, the ironclad CSS Tennessee was launched, but when trying to get past the bar, became stuck due to insufficient water levels until May. While Tennessee was stuck at the bar, Tuscaloosa was sent to the lower part of the bay to aid in the defenses there. Union Navy forces attacked in August, bringing on the Battle of Mobile Bay, which was a Union victory.

After the defeat in the bay, the Confederates only had four warships left to defend Mobile: Tuscaloosa, Huntsville, the ironclad CSS Nashville, and the gunboat CSS Morgan. Union forces did not attempt to take Mobile itself until January 1865, when a land force led by E. R. S. Canby began advancing against it. The city was defended on land by Spanish Fort and Fort Blakeley. Sieges of the forts began in late March, and Spanish Fort surrendered on April 8 and Fort Blakeley on April 9. The city of Mobile surrendered on April 12. Tuscaloosa and Huntsville were unable to steam against the current in the Spanish River, and Tuscaloosa was scuttled at the confluence of the Spanish River and the Mobile River on that same day. Huntsville was sunk as well, and the wrecks served as blockships. Tuscaloosa's crew and supplies were transferred to Nashville. The wreck was discovered in the 1980s, and Bisbee notes that the wreck is "apparently almost completely intact".

Huntsville was ordered on May 1, 1862, by the Confederate States Navy. She was launched at the Confederate Naval Works at Selma on February 7, 1863, and finished in Mobile. She was finally delivered on August 1, 1863. She was only partially armored, with the armor plate delivered by the Shelby Iron Company of Shelby, Alabama and the Atlanta Rolling Mill. She had defective engines that were obtained from a river steamer and an incomplete armament, so was assigned to guard the waters around Mobile.

Huntsville escaped up the Spanish River following the Battle of Mobile Bay on August 5, 1864. The city of Mobile held out another eight months, with the upper portion of Mobile Bay remaining in Confederate hands. She, along with the CSS Tuscaloosa, was scuttled to prevent capture on April 12, 1865, following the surrender of the city. The wreck lies where the Spanish River splits off from the Mobile River on the north side of Blakeley Island, just north of Mobile, until being located in 1985.

== Ships ==
Construction data
Ship name	Namesake	Builder	Laid down	Launched	Fate
CSS Huntsville	Huntsville, Alabama	Henry D. Bassett, Selma, Alabama	May 1862	7 February 1863	Scuttled to prevent capture, 12 April 1865
CSS Tuscaloosa	Tuscaloosa, Alabama	Henry D. Bassett, Selma, Alabama	May 1862	7 February 1863	Scuttled to prevent capture, 12 April 1865

== Bibliography ==
- Bisbee, Saxon T. (2018). Engines of Rebellion: Confederate Ironclads and Steam Engineering in the American Civil War. Tuscaloosa, Alabama: University of Alabama Press. ISBN 978-0-81731-986-1.
- Canney, Donald L. (2015). The Confederate Steam Navy 1861-1865. Atglen, Pennsylvania: Schiffer Publishing. ISBN 978-0-7643-4824-2.
- Gaines, W. Craig (2008). Encyclopedia of Civil War Shipwrecks. Baton Rouge, Louisiana: Louisiana State University Press. ISBN 978-0-8071-3274-6.
- "Huntsville". Dictionary of American Naval Fighting Ships. Naval History and Heritage Command, United States Navy.
- Luraghi, Raimondo (1996). A History of the Confederate Navy. Annapolis, Maryland: Naval Institute Press. ISBN 1-55750-527-6.
- Silverstone, Paul H. (1984). Directory of the World's Capital Ships. New York: Hippocrene Books. ISBN 0-88254-979-0.
- Silverstone, Paul H. (1989). Warships of the Civil War Navies. Annapolis, Maryland: Naval Institute Press. ISBN 0-87021-783-6.
- Still, William N. Jr. (1988) [1971]. Iron Afloat: The Story of the Confederate Armorclads. Columbia, South Carolina: University of South Carolina Press. ISBN 0-87249-454-3.
- Turner, Maxine (1999) [1988]. Navy Gray: Engineering the Confederate Navy on the Chattahoochee and Apalachicola Rivers. Macon, Georgia: Mercer University Press. ISBN 0-86554-642-8.
- "Tuscaloosa". Dictionary of American Naval Fighting Ships. Naval History and Heritage Command, United States Navy.
