= List of shipwrecks in April 1865 =

The list of shipwrecks in April 1865 includes ships sunk, foundered, grounded, or otherwise lost during April 1865.

== 1 April ==
List of shipwrecks: 1 April 1865
Ship	State	Description
Bertrand	United States	Carrying a cargo of agricultural goods, clothes, food, machinery, mercury, mining supplies, whiskey, and Union Army howitzer ammunition to mining districts in Montana Territory, the 251-ton sidewheel paddle steamer sank in 8 feet (2.4 meters) of water five to ten minutes after striking a snag in the Desoto Bend of the Missouri River at 41°31′24″N 96°1′44″W, near what is now Blair, Nebraska.
Capella	Netherlands	The ship was run down and sunk by Southern Empire (United Kingdom). Her crew were rescued by Southern Empire. Capella was on a voyage from Batavia, Netherlands East Indies to Amsterdam, North Holland.
USS Rodolph	United States Navy	Illustration of USS Rodolph striking the mine. American Civil War, Battle of Spanish Fort, Battle of Fort Blakeley: While operating as a minesweeper, the tinclad sternwheel paddle steamer struck a Confederate mine in the Blakeley River in Alabama and sank with the loss of four crewmen killed and 11 injured.

== 2 April ==
List of shipwrecks: 2 April 1865
Ship	State	Description
Anna Erdmann	Grand Duchy of Oldenburg	The barque was wrecked near Rangoon, Burma.

== 3 April ==
List of shipwrecks: 3 April 1865
Ship	State	Description
Arbutus	United Kingdom	The steamship sank between Ballantrae, Ayrshire and the Giant's Causeway, County Antrim. She was on a voyage from Londonderry to Morecambe, Lancashire. She was refloated in late April and taken in to Londonderry.
CSS Beaufort	Confederate States Navy	American Civil War: The armed tug was scuttled in the James River near Drewry's Bluff, Virginia, to prevent her capture by Union forces.
Bill Point	United Kingdom	The ship ran aground at Heligoland. She was on a voyage from Liverpool, Lancashire to Hamburg.
Cambridge	United Kingdom	The ship was driven ashore at Flamborough Head, Yorkshire. She was on a voyage from Sunderland, County Durham to London.
Conrad	Hamburg	The brig was driven ashore on Scharhörn. She was on a voyage from Middlesbrough, Yorkshire to Hamburg. She was refloated.
Edward Cary	United States	American Civil War: The whaler, a full-rigged ship, was burned at Lea Harbor, Ponape, in the Pacific Ocean by the merchant raider CSS Shenandoah (Confederate States Navy). Shenandoah had captured her at Lea Harbor on 1 April.
CSS Fredericksburg	Confederate States Navy	American Civil War: The ironclad warship was burned and scuttled in the James River near Drewry's Bluff, to prevent her capture by Union forces.
CSS Hampton	Confederate States Navy	American Civil War: The screw gunboat was burned in the James River at Richmond, Virginia, to prevent her capture by Union forces.
Harriet	United Kingdom	The schooner ran aground off Hornsea, Yorkshire. She was on a voyage from Middlesbrough, Yorkshire to Caen, Calvados, France. She was refloated and put in to Scarborough, Yorkshire in a leaky condition.
Harvest	United States	American Civil War: The whaler, a barque, was captured, run aground, and burned at Lea Harbor by the merchant raider CSS Shenandoah (Confederate States Navy).
Hector	United States	American Civil War: The whaler, a full-rigged ship, was captured, run onto a reef, and burned at Lea Harbor by the merchant raider CSS Shenandoah (Confederate States Navy).
CSS Nansemond	Confederate States Navy	American Civil War: The gunboat was burned and scuttled in the James River at Drewry's Bluff, to prevent her capture by Union forces.
CSS Patrick Henry	Confederate States Navy	American Civil War: The sidewheel paddle steamer, schoolship of the Confederate States Naval Academy was burned at Rocketts Navy Yard in Richmond, Virginia, to prevent her capture by Union forces.
Pearl	United States	American Civil War: The whaler, a bark, was captured, run aground, stripped, and burned at Lea Harbor by the merchant raider CSS Shenandoah (Confederate States Navy).
CSS Richmond	Confederate States Navy	American Civil War: The ironclad ram was burned and scuttled in the James River near Drewry's Bluff, to prevent her capture by Union forces.
CSS Roanoke	Confederate States Navy	American Civil War: The gunboat was burned in the James River at Richmond, to prevent her capture by Union forces.
CSS Shrapnel	Confederate States Navy	American Civil War: The torpedo boat was burned in the James River at Richmond, to prevent her capture by Union forces.
HMS Swallow	Royal Navy	The Swallow-class sloop was driven ashore in the Mediterranean Sea. She was refloated, repaired and returned to service.
Tom Cringle	United Kingdom	The brig ran aground at Winterton-on-Sea, Norfolk. She was on a voyage from Hartlepool, County Durham to London. She was refloated, but had to be beached. She was later refloated and taken in to Great Yarmouth, Norfolk in a severely leaky condition.
CSS Torpedo	Confederate States Navy	American Civil War: The torpedo boat tender, a screw steamer, was partially burned and sunk in the James River at Richmond, to prevent her capture by Union forces. She was refloated by Union forces in May.
Tyneside	United Kingdom	The ship ran aground at Heligoland. She was on a voyage from Liverpool to Hamburg.
CSS Virginia II	Confederate States Navy	American Civil War: The ironclad warship was burned and scuttled on the James River near Drewry's Bluff, to prevent her capture by Union forces. The fire caused her ammunition magazine to explode.
Wigtownshire	United Kingdom	The barque was abandoned in the Atlantic Ocean. Her crew were rescued by the steamship Aleppo (United Kingdom). Wigtownshire was on a voyage from South Shields, County Durham to Genoa, Italy. She was towed in to Plymouth, Devon in a derelict condition on 7 April by the steamship Corea (United Kingdom).

== 4 April ==
List of shipwrecks: 4 April 1865
Ship	State	Description
Buchan	United Kingdom	The barque was wrecked on the Haisborough Sands, in the North Sea off the coast of Norfolk. Her crew were rescued. She was on a voyage from Le Tréport, Seine-Inférieure, France to Sunderland, County Durham.
Seaboard	Confederate States of America	American Civil War: Captured by Union Army troops and the armed tug USS Lilac (United States Navy) at Upper Tree Hill Bridge on the James River below Richmond, Virginia, the tug struck a snag on the James at Drewry's Bluff and was run aground. She later was refloated.
Three Friends	(United Kingdom of Great Britain and Ireland) Queensland	The schooner was driven ashore on Gloucester Island. She was refloated.

== 5 April ==
List of shipwrecks: 5 April 1865
Ship	State	Description
Blond	United Kingdom	The ship was driven ashore at Wells-next-the-Sea, Norfolk. She was on a voyage from South Shields, County Durham to London. She was refloated with assistance and resumed her voyage.
Danube	United Kingdom	The ship ran aground near Helsingborg, Sweden. She was on a voyage from North Shields, Northumberland to Copenhagen, Denmark.
Jemima	United Kingdom	The ship ran aground near Helsingborg. She was on a voyage from North Shields to Copenhagen.
Meech	(United Kingdom of Great Britain and Ireland) Jersey	The brigantine was driven ashore at Wells-next-the-Sea. She was on a voyage from South Shields to Jersey. She was refloated and resumed her voyage.
Mystic	United States	American Civil War: The 154-ton sidewheel paddle steamer was captured and burned on the Neuse River in North Carolina by troops of the 67th North Carolina Regiment.
Samarang	United Kingdom	The barque ran aground on the Goodwin Sands, Kent. She was on a voyage from Almería, Spain to Newcastle upon Tyne, Northumberland. She was refloated on 7 April.
Sarah Atlee	United States	The ship was driven ashore at Baltimore, Maryland. She was on a voyage from Sagua La Grande, Cuba to Baltimore.
Vesper	United Kingdom	The ship ran aground near Helsingborg. She was on a voyage from North Shields to Copenhagen.
Unidentified transport	United States	American Civil War: The transport, carrying a cargo of commissary stores, was captured and burned on the Neuse River in North Carolina near Cowpen Landing by troops of the 67th North Carolina Regiment.

== 6 April ==
List of shipwrecks: 6 April 1865
Ship	State	Description
Atlantic	United States	The brig ran ground on Looe Key and was wrecked, a total loss.
Gertina	United Kingdom	The schooner ran aground on the Goodwin Sands, Kent. She was on a voyage from Newcastle upon Tyne, Northumberland to Cádiz, Spain.

== 7 April ==
List of shipwrecks: 7 April 1865
Ship	State	Description
Caroline Henrietta	Sweden	The ship was driven ashore by ice at Landskrona. She was refloated on 10 April and taken in to Landskrona.
Marie	United Kingdom	The steamship was damaged by fire at Copenhagen, Denmark. She was on a voyage from Lübeck to Copenhagen.
Minquas (or Minquass)	United States	American Civil War: The 160-ton sidehweel paddle steamer and two barges carrying quartermaster and commissary supplies she was towing were captured and burned on the Neuse River in North Carolina by troops of the 67th North Carolina Regiment.
Rocket	United Kingdom	The ship was driven ashore at the South Foreland, Kent.
Unidentified ironclad	Confederate States of America	American Civil War: The incomplete ironclad warship was destroyed by Confederate forces while still on the building ways at Edwards Ferry, North Carolina.

== 8 April ==
List of shipwrecks: 8 April 1865
Ship	State	Description
Anne	United Kingdom	The ship foundered in the English Channel off Sudmore Point, Isle of Wight. She was on a voyage from Caen, Calvados, France to Llanelly, Glamorgan.
Coquette	United Kingdom	The ship ran aground on the Lillegrunden, in the Baltic Sea. She was later refloated and put in to Copenhagen, Denmark.
Derwent	United Kingdom	The barque foundered off Cape de Gatt, Spain. Her crew were rescued by the brig Cambyses (United Kingdom). Derwent was on a voyage from Constantinople, Ottoman Empire to Cork.
Drie Gezusters	Denmark	The ship sank off Kastrup.
Eclipse	United Kingdom	The ship was driven ashore near Bideford, Devon. She was on a voyage from London to Swansea, Glamorgan.
James and Eleanor	United Kingdom	The ship was driven ashore on Anholt, Denmark. She was refloated and resumed her voyage.
Justinian	United Kingdom	The ship was driven ashore on Anholt. She was on a voyage from Newcastle upon Tyne, Northumberland to Swinemünde, Prussia. She was refloated and resumed her voyage.
Lady Stanley	United Kingdom	The ship was driven ashore on Anholt. She was refloated and resumed her voyage.
Reina	United Kingdom	The ship was wrecked on the Isle of Wight. She was on a voyage form Portland, Dorset to London.
Unidentified floating battery	Confederate States Navy	American Civil War: The floating battery was sunk in shallow water by a drifting Confederate mine while anchored in the Roanoke River 8 nautical miles (15 km) upstream of Plymouth, North Carolina, then was burned by a launch from the gunboat USS Iosco (United States Navy) and a cutter from the gunboat USS Mattabesett (United States Navy).

== 10 April ==
List of shipwrecks: 10 April 1865
Ship	State	Description
Fingal	United Kingdom	The steamship ran aground on the Middelgrunden, in the Baltic Sea. She was refloated but collided with the brig Odessa Packet (United Kingdom) and was then driven ashore at Dragør, Denmark. She was on a voyage from London to Danzig.
Ino	United Kingdom	The schooner sprang a leak and foundered 10 nautical miles (19 km) off the Glénan Islands, Finistère, France. Her crew were rescued by a fishing vessel. She was on a voyage from Brighton, Sussex to Nantes, Loire-Inférieure, France.
Middleton	(United Kingdom of Great Britain and Ireland) Jersey	The brig was driven ashore at Flamborough Head, Yorkshire. She was on a voyage from London to Sunderland, County Durham. She was refloated and towed in to Scarborough, Yorkshire.
Odessa Packet	United Kingdom	The brig was run into by the steamship Fingal and was driven ashore at Dragør.

== 11 April ==
List of shipwrecks: 11 April 1865
Ship	State	Description
Annie	Confederate States of America	American Civil War, Union blockade: The sloop, carrying a cargo of cotton, was captured in the Gulf of Mexico off the Crystal River in Florida by the schooner USS Sea Bird (United States Navy) and subsequently destroyed.
Florida	Confederate States of America	American Civil War, Union blockade: The sloop, carrying a cargo of cotton, was captured and scuttled in the Gulf of Mexico] off the Crystal River in Florida by the schooner USS Sea Bird (United States Navy) and subsequently destroyed.
George	United Kingdom	The smack was driven ashore at Broadford, Skye, Outer Hebrides. She was on a voyage from Londonderry to Broadford. She was refloated and taken in to Broadford in a severely leaky condition.

== 12 April ==
List of shipwrecks: 12 April 1865
Ship	State	Description
USS Althea	United States Navy	American Civil War: The screw steamer tugboat, being used as a minesweeper, sank in Blakeley River, off Mobile Bay Alabama after striking a Confederate mine off Battery Huger. Two crewmen killed. Raised in November and returned to service.
CSS Huntsville	Confederate States Navy	American Civil War:The ironclad warship was scuttled at 30.76924°N 88.02053°W in the Spanish River in Alabama to avoid capture by Union forces.
CSS Tuscaloosa	Confederate States Navy	American Civil War: The ironclad ram was scuttled at 30.76924°N 88.02053°W in the Spanish River 12 nautical miles (22 km) north of Mobile, Alabama, to avoid capture by Union forces.

== 13 April ==
List of shipwrecks: 13 April 1865
Ship	State	Description
Balclutha	(United Kingdom of Great Britain and Ireland) New South Wales	The steamship ran aground in the Fitzroy River. She was on a voyage from Rockhampton, Queensland to Sydney.
USS Ida	United States Navy	American Civil War: The screw steamer tugboat, being used as a minesweeper, sank in Mobile Bay off the coast of Alabama after striking a Confederate mine. Five crew killed. Guns and engine salvaged. Raised 11 September and sold.
Jura	French Navy	The Jura-class transport ship ran aground west of Cape Corbelin, Algeria. She was on a voyage from Algiers to Bougie.
Locuste	France	The steamship was wrecked at Sidi Ferruch, Algeria. Her crew were rescued. She was on a voyage from Gibraltar to Port Said, Egypt.

== 14 April ==
List of shipwrecks: 14 April 1865
Ship	State	Description
Augusta	Confederate States of America	American Civil War, Wilson's Raid: Carrying a cargo of cotton and bacon, the steamer was captured on the Coosa River by the 4th Regiment Kentucky Volunteer Cavalry. She was taken to Montgomery, Alabama and burned.
Henry J. King	Confederate States of America	American Civil War, Wilson's Raid: Carrying a cargo of cotton and bacon, the 409 ton side-wheel steamer was captured on the Coosa River by the 4th Regiment Kentucky Volunteer Cavalry. She was taken to Montgomery and burned.
Milliner	Confederate States of America	American Civil War, Wilson's Raid: Carrying a cargo of cotton, corn, and bacon, the steamer was captured on the Coosa River by the 4th Regiment Kentucky Volunteer Cavalry. She was taken to Montgomery and burned.
USS Sciota	United States Navy	American Civil War: The gunboat sank in Mobile Bay off Mobile, Alabama, after striking a Confederate mine. Her wreck was raised and sold later in 1865.
Stork	United Kingdom	The steamship ran aground off "Bansburstel". She was on a voyage from London to Hamburg.
Two unidentified steamboats	Confederate States of America	American Civil War, Wilson's Raid: The steamboats, carrying cargoes of cotton, corn, and commissary stores, were captured on the Coosa River by the 4th Regiment Kentucky Volunteer Cavalry. They were taken to Montgomery and burned.

== 15 April ==
List of shipwrecks: 15 April 1865
Ship	State	Description
Edward Barnetete	United Kingdom	The ship ran aground on the Baggy Heap, in the Bristol Channel and was damaged. She was refloated and put in to Ilfracombe, Devon in a severely leaky condition.
Georges	France	The ship was wrecked on Guernsey, Channel Islands. Her crew were rescued. She was on a voyage from an English port to Morlaix, Finistère.
Johore	India	The steamship was destroyed by a boiler explosion at Singapore, Straits Settlements with the loss of 26 lives.
Mathilde	United Kingdom	The ship ran aground on Estholm. She was on a voyage from Memel, Prussia to an English port. She had been refloated by 22 April and had resumed her voyage.
Susannah	(United Kingdom of Great Britain and Ireland) British North America	The ship was wrecked on Georges Island, off Monhegan, Maine, United States.

== 16 April ==
List of shipwrecks: 16 April 1865
Ship	State	Description
Annie Baldwin	United Kingdom	The ship drifted aground on Conch Reef, Florida, Confederate States of America and was wrecked.
Ellwood	United States	The 171-ton sidewheel paddle steamer burned on the Hatchie River in Tennessee.
Hebe of the Exe	United Kingdom	The ship was driven ashore and wrecked at the Cabo de Santa Maria, Portugal. She was on a voyage from Liverpool, Lancashire to Pernambuco, Brazil.
HMS Leopard	Royal Navy	The Centaur-class frigate was driven ashore on the coast of China. She was subsequently refloated, repaired and returned to service.

== 17 April ==
List of shipwrecks: 17 April 1865
Ship	State	Description
Anne Baldwin	United Kingdom	The ship was wrecked on the Little Conch Reef, off the coast of Florida, Confederate States of America. She was on a voyage from Puerto Rico to London. Salvage efforts were fruitless and she was abandoned on 19 April. Her crew were rescued and taken to Key West, Florida.
CSS Chattahoochee	Confederate States Navy	Stern section of the wreck of CSS Chattahoochee after salvage, ca. 1965. American Civil War, Battle of Columbus: The screw gunboat was scuttled in the Chattahoochee River at Columbus, Georgia, to prevent her capture by Union forces.
John McIntyre	United Kingdom	The steamship was driven ashore near The Lizard, Cornwall. She was on a voyage from the River Thames to Cardiff, Glamorgan She was refloated on 26 April and towed in to Penzance, Cornwall.
Lark	(United Kingdom of Great Britain and Ireland) British North America	The ship was wrecked near Rockport, Maine, United States. Her crew were rescued.
CSS Jackson	Confederate States Navy	American Civil War, Battle of Columbus: The ironclad ram, captured by Union Army cavalry forces the previous day, was burned and sunk in the Chattahoochee River between Columbus, Georgia, and Girard, Alabama, to prevent Confederate forces from recapturing her.
Sirocco	United Kingdom	The ship was driven ashore 12 nautical miles (22 km) east of the Rangoon Lightship ( (United Kingdom of Great Britain and Ireland) Burma. She was on a voyage from Colombo, Ceylon to Rangoon, Burma.

== 18 April ==
List of shipwrecks: 18 April 1865
Ship	State	Description
Annie Comrie	United Kingdom	The ship put in to Plymouth, Devon on fire and sank. She was on a voyage from Cochin, India to London.
Ceres	United Kingdom	The ship was driven ashore at North Coates, Lincolnshire. She was on a voyage from Lowestoft, Suffolk to Seaham, County Durham. She was refloated and taken in to Grimsby, Lincolnshire in a severely leaky condition.
Daphne	United Kingdom	The ship foundered in the Indian Ocean. Her crew were rescued by City of Madras (United Kingdom). Daphne was on a voyage from Bombay, India to Liverpool, Lancashire.
Mary Betsey	United Kingdom	The ship struck the Platt.
Sam Dunning	United Kingdom	The full-rigged ship was wrecked at sea with the loss of 25 of her 31 crew. Survivors were rescued on 24 April by the full-rigged ship Chariot of Fame (United Kingdom). Sam Dunning was on a voyage from Rangoon, Burma to London.

== 19 April ==
List of shipwrecks: 19 April 1865
Ship	State	Description
Daira	France	The steamship was lost in the Bienfacia Strait. She was on a voyage from Marseille, Bouches-du-Rhône to Thessaloniki, Greece and Constantinople, Ottoman Empire.
Denbigh	Confederate States of America	American Civil War, Union blockade: The blockade runner ran aground on the bar at Galveston, Texas, while trying to put to sea. She was refloated and continued her voyage after her crew threw 200 bales of cotton overboard.
Lady Jane	United States	The 40-ton steamer struck a bridge on the Mississippi River at Rock Island, Illinois, and sank with the loss of one life.
Ocean Queen	United Kingdom	The steamship ran aground on the Whitby Rock, Whitby, Yorkshire, broke in two and was wrecked. All fifteen people on board were rescued by the Whitby Lifeboat.

== 20 April ==
List of shipwrecks: 20 April 1865
Ship	State	Description
Elizabeth	Hamburg	The ship ran aground on the Goodwin Sands, Kent, United Kingdom. She was on a voyage from Hamburg to Ciudad Bolívar, Venezuela. She was refloated and taken in to Ramsgate, Kent.
Locuste	France	The steamship was wrecked at Sidi-Ferruch, Algeria. Her crew were rescued.
Petrel	United Kingdom	The ship ran aground on Scroby Sands, Norfolk. She was on a voyage from South Shields, County Durham to Ramsgate. She was refloated and taken in to Great Yarmouth, Norfolk.

== 21 April ==
List of shipwrecks: 21 April 1865
Ship	State	Description
Angela	Kingdom of Hanover	The schooner was wrecked on the Sunk Sand, in the North Sea off the coast of Essex, United Kingdom. Her crew were rescued by HMRC Desmond ( Board of Customs). Angela was on a voyage from London, United Kingdom to Riga, Russia.
Brackenholm	United Kingdom	The schooner collided with HMS Supply (Royal Navy) and sank in the English Channel 10 nautical miles (19 km) south of St. Catherine's Point, Isle of Wight. Her crew were rescued by HMS Supply. Brackenholm was on a voyage from Birkenhead, Cheshire to London.
Charles Stuart	United Kingdom	The collier ran aground on the Haisborough Sands, in the North Sea off the coast of Norfolk. She was refloated but was consequently beached at Sea Palling. Her crew were rescued. She was later refloated and taken in to Great Yarmouth.
Fiery Star	United Kingdom	The clipper caught fire at sea. All 97 people on board were rescued by the barque Dauntless (United Kingdom). Fiery Star was on a voyage from Moreton Bay to London.
Peep o'Day	United Kingdom	The lugger was wrecked on the Dogger Bank, in the Irish Sea off the coast of County Wexford. Her six crew were rescued by the Rosslare Lifeboat Resolute ( Royal National Lifeboat Institution).

== 22 April ==
List of shipwrecks: 22 April 1865
Ship	State	Description
Anton	Grand Duchy of Oldenburg	The barque was driven ashore at Assu, Brazil and was abandoned by her crew.
USS Black Hawk	United States Navy	USS Black Hawk burns. American Civil War: The armed sidewheel paddle steamer was destroyed by an accidental fire and ammunition magazine explosion and sank on the Ohio River three miles (4.8 km) above Cairo, Illinois, with the loss of four lives. The gunboat USS Tempest (United States Navy) rescued most or all of her survivors. Black Hawk was refloated in 1867 and sold for scrap.
Shamrock	United Kingdom	The steamship was holed by a rock at Broomielaw, Renfrewshire.

== 24 April ==
List of shipwrecks: 24 April 1865
Ship	State	Description
Black Diamond	(United Kingdom of Great Britain and Ireland) New Zealand	The 100-ton brigantine was wrecked at New Plymouth, where she had travelled with a load of timber from Havelock. She drifted ashore and holed, sinking with most of her cargo. All hands were saved.
USS O. M. Pettit	United States Navy	American Civil War: The sidewheel tug sank in the Savannah River near Hammond, Georgia. She was refloated, repaired, and returned to service.
CSS Webb	Confederate States Navy	Illustration of CSS Webb burning. American Civil War, Union blockade: The ram was run aground and burned by her crew on the Mississippi River 25 nautical miles (46 km) downstream of New Orleans, Louisiana, to prevent her capture by Union forces.

== 25 April ==
List of shipwrecks: 25 April 1865
Ship	State	Description
Amateur	United Kingdom	The barque put in to Cockburn Sound in a sinking condition. She was on a voyage from Champion Bay to Sydney, New South Wales.

== 26 April ==
List of shipwrecks: 26 April 1865
Ship	State	Description
Olivia	United Kingdom	The ship was driven ashore at Corton, Suffolk. She was refloated and resumed her voyage.

== 27 April ==
List of shipwrecks: 27 April 1865
Ship	State	Description
Mary	United Kingdom	The schooner ran aground on the Whiting Sand, in the North Sea off the coast of Norfolk. She was on a voyage from King's Lynn, Norfolk to Newcastle upon Tyne, Northumberland. She was refloated and put back to King's Lynn for repairs.
Sultana	United States	Illustration of Sultana burning from Harper's Weekly, 20 May 1865. The sidewheel paddle steamer was destroyed on the Mississippi River 4 nautical miles (7.4 km) south of Memphis, Tennessee, by a boiler explosion and fire. Estimates of the number of dead range from 1,100 to 1,547, with the most recent evidence indicating that 1,196 passengers and crew lost their lives. One estimate places the number of survivors as low as 931, although the most recent estimate is that 959 survived.
Thomas Campbell	United Kingdom	The ship was driven ashore at Carnsore Point, County Wexford. She was on a voyage from Rotterdam, South Holland, Netherlands to Liverpool, Lancashire. She was refloated the next day and resumed her voyage.

== 28 April ==
List of shipwrecks: 28 April 1865
Ship	State	Description
Evening Star	United Kingdom	The ship foundered in the Pacific Ocean 500 nautical miles (930 km) west south west of Callao, Peru. Her crew took to the boats; they were rescued on 4 Mar by HMS Shearwater (Royal Navy). Evening Star was on a voyage from Callao to Cowes, Isle of Wight.
Independence	(United Kingdom of Great Britain and Ireland) British North America	The brig was driven ashore near Cape Hogan, Nova Scotia. She was on a voyage from Buctouche, New Brunswick to London. She was refloated on 30 April.

== 29 April ==
List of shipwrecks: 29 April 1865
Ship	State	Description
Loyal	(United Kingdom of Great Britain and Ireland) British North America	The schooner was wrecked on Big Tusket Island, Nova Scotia. She was on a voyage from Halifax to Yarmouth.

== 30 April ==
List of shipwrecks: 30 April 1865
Ship	State	Description
Eintracht	Kingdom of Hanover	The galiot was wrecked in St. Austell Bay. Her crew were rescued by the Fowey Lifeboat.

== Unknown date ==
List of shipwrecks: Unknown date in April 1865
Ship	State	Description
Alpha	(United Kingdom of Great Britain and Ireland) New Zealand	The cutter went ashore at Pātea and became wrecked.
Antonia	United Kingdom	The ship was wrecked in the Paracel Islands before 14 April.
A 1	United States	The barque foundered in the Indian Ocean. She was on a voyage from Akyab, Burma to Cork or Falmouth, Cornwall, United Kingdom.
Carl Emilie	Flag unknown	The ship was wrecked near Nassau, Bahamas. She was on a voyage from Nassau to Matamoros, Mexico.
Catharina	Belgium	The ship foundered off Cape Finisterre, Spain. She was on a voyage from Antwerp to Galaţi, Ottoman Empire.
Carrig	United Kingdom	The ship was driven ashore at Gallipoli, Ottoman Empire. She was on a voyage from Sulina, Ottoman Empire to Wexford. She was refloated on 19 April and resumed her voyage.
Chin Chin	China	The ship was wrecked in Howetow Bay. She was on a voyage from Swatow to Amoy.
Christianton	Denmark	The ship was wrecked on Anholt. She was on a voyage from Sunderland, County Durham, United Kingdom to Sonderborg.
Clara Poe	United States	American Civil War: The 208-ton sternwheel paddle steamer was burned by Confederate forces on the Cumberland River at Eddyville, Kentucky, on 15 or 17 April.
Claudia	United Kingdom	The schooner was wrecked near Gallipoli.
C. M. von Behr	Prussia	The ship ran aground near Skodsberg, Denmark. She was on a voyage from Hartlepool, County Durham to Pillau.
Dragon	United Kingdom	The ship ran aground near Skodsberg.
Emma	United Kingdom	The ship was wrecked in the Bahamas.
Forsoget	Norway	The ship was driven ashore at Wick, Caithness, United Kingdom.
General Whiting	United States	American Civil War: The 816-gross register ton steamer′s hull was recovered near Wilmington, North Carolina, and was discovered to have had its midships section burned and its machinery stripped.
Harriet DeFord	United States	American Civil War: Captured by Confederate guerrillas in the Chesapeake Bay off Fairhaven, Maryland, on 4 April during a voyage from Patuxent to Baltimore, Maryland, the 149-ton screw steamer was burned to the waterline in Dimer's Creek, Virginia to prevent recapture late on the 6th or early on the 7 as she was still burning when found early in the day.
Hedley Vicars	United Kingdom	The brig was in collision with the steamship Berwick (United Kingdom and sank near South Shields, County Durham.
Helene	Kingdom of Hanover	The koff foundered off Mallorca, Spain. She was on a voyage from Ardrossan, Ayrshire, United Kingdom to Marseille, Bouches-du-Rhône, France.
J. L. Gerrity	United States	The schooner was wrecked on Stirrup Key. Crew saved.
Jupiter	United Kingdom	The barque was wrecked in Ruma Bay, Kingdom of Greece before 6 April. Her eighteen crew survived.
Kate Kearney	United Kingdom	The brig sank at Saltholmen, Norway. She was on a voyage from Grimsby, Lincolnshire to a Baltic port. She was refloated on 19 April and taken in to Copenhagen, Denmark.
Leda	United Kingdom	The ship ran aground at Dragør, Denmark. She was on a voyage from Rostock to Liverpool, Lancashire.
Melita	France	The ship capsized off Saint-Vaast-la-Hougue, Manche. She was on a voyage from Rouen, Seine-Inférieure to Liverpool. She was towed in to Quillebeuf-sur-Seine, eure.
Mimer	United Kingdom	The ship ran aground near Gallipoli.
USS Rose	United States Navy	American Civil War: The 96-ton armed tug, a screw steamer, was sunk by a Confederate mine in Mobile Bay, Alabama, Confederate States of America with the loss of two killed and three wounded. She was refloated, repaired, and returned to service.
St. Paul	United States	American Civil War: The steamer was burned on the Hatchie River in Tennessee by Confederate guerrillas who had captured her on 16 April, killing one of her deckhands in the process.
Scillonian	(United Kingdom of Great Britain and Ireland) New Zealand	The schooner went ashore and was wrecked at Waitotara while en route from Wellington to Pātea.
Sons	United Kingdom	The ship sank off Souter Point, Northumberland. She was on a voyage from Middlesbrough, Yorkshire to Newcastle upon Tyne, Northumberland.
