= Shelby Iron Company Railroad =

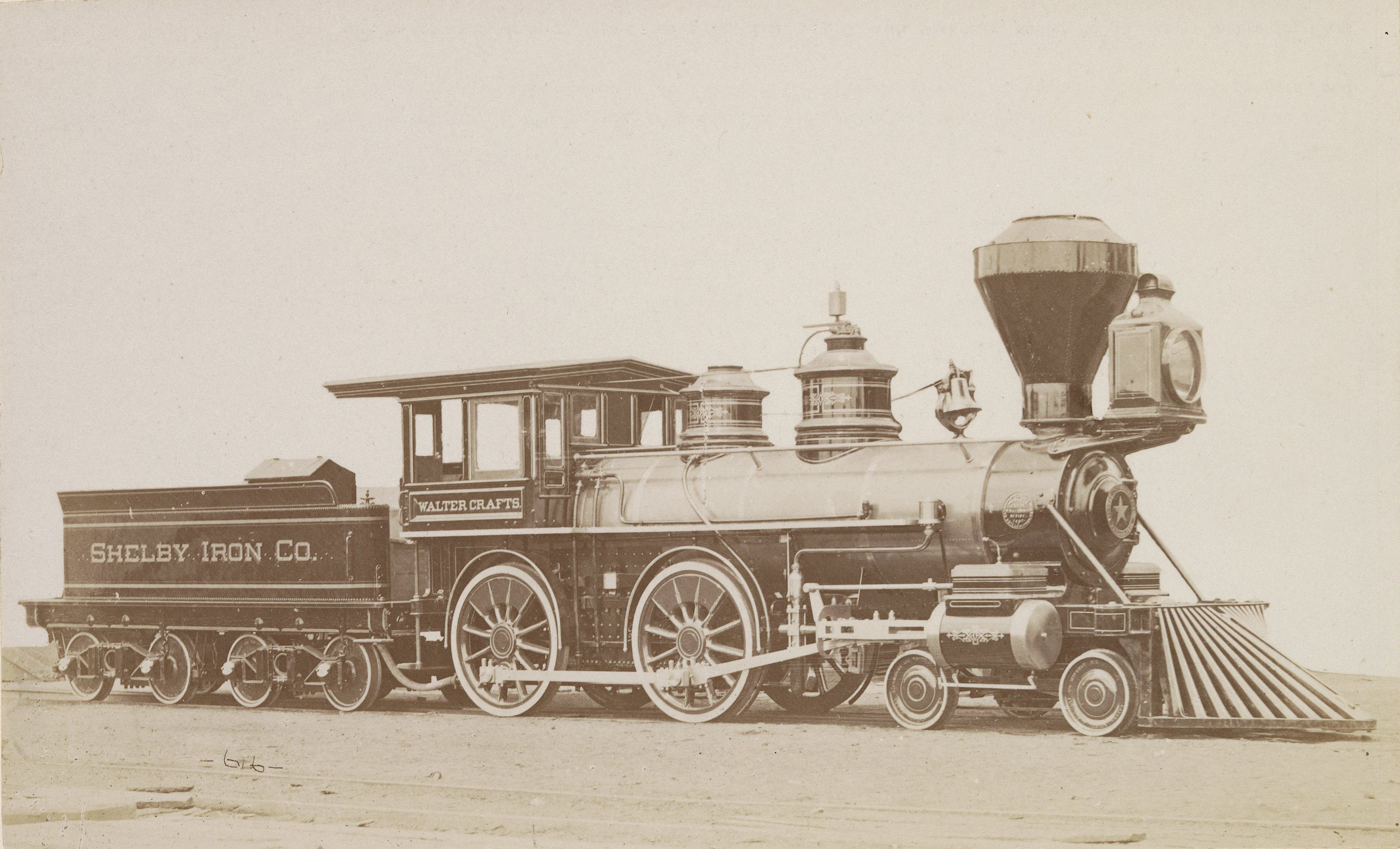
4-4-0 steam locomotive Walter Crafts

The Shelby Iron Company Railroad was an Alabama railroad company that started during the American Civil War. The Shelby Iron Company Railroad was built to connect the Shelby Iron Company in Shelby, Alabama, to the Alabama and Tennessee River Railroad at Columbiana, Alabama, a distance of about five miles (8 km). It was a 5 ft (1,524 mm) gauge railroad line which was converted to 4 ft 9 in (1,448 mm) in 1886

== History ==
The Shelby Iron Company was a major supplier of Confederate iron during the Civil War, with almost all the iron produced being delivered to the Confederate Naval Works in Selma. Iron plating for the CSS Tennessee, CSS Huntsville, and CSS Tuscaloosa was all manufactured by the Shelby Iron Company.

By 1863, officials with the iron company were attempting to increase output, but were hampered by the lack of a railroad line. Confederate Ordinance officials prevented the construction for more than two years by threatening to have senior company employees conscripted if they built the line. Despite the threat, construction began in 1863 and was completed in January 1865.

== Rolling stock ==
The railroad's only locomotive, called The Decatur, was purchased in 1864 from the Alabama and Mississippi Rivers Railroad, and the company used railroad cars borrowed from other carriers.

== Destruction and rebuilding ==
The Iron Works was destroyed during Wilson's Raid on March 31, 1865. Around 1867, the Shelby Iron Company reconstructed its rail spur from Shelby to Columbiana and the furnace was rebuilt by February 1869. The Shelby Iron Company Railroad was operated by the ironworks until it was purchased by the Louisville and Nashville Railroad in 1890 and made part of the Alabama Mineral Railroad. Both operators provided sporadic passenger service until 1927.
