= Charles H. McBlair =

Charles Henry McBlair
- Born: December 24, 1809; Baltimore, Maryland, U.S.
- Died: November 15, 1890 (aged 80); Washington, D.C., U.S.
- Burial place: Green Mount Cemetery; Baltimore, Maryland, U.S.
- Military career
- Allegiance: United States of America; Confederate States of America; Maryland
- Branch: United States Navy; Confederate States Navy; Confederate States Army
- Service years: 1823–1861 (USA); 1861–1865 (CSA); 1869–1874 (MD)

Charles Henry McBlair (1809–1890) was the eleventh adjutant general of Maryland. He was an officer in the United States Navy, and during the American Civil War commanded a number of Confederate warships.

== Biography ==
=== Early career, US Navy ===
McBlair was born in Baltimore, Maryland, 24 December 1809. He entered the U.S. Navy as a midshipman, 4 March 1823; passed midshipman, 23 November 1829; commissioned a lieutenant from 12 July 1831, and ordered for duty as sailing master on the U.S.S. Ontario in the Mediterranean; returning to the United States, was ordered, successively, to the U.S.S. Warren, to the Mediterranean Station, to the U.S.S. Mississippi, and in October 1842, to command the U.S.S. Poinsett.

He served in the Mexican War (1846–1847), and commanded the bomb-barge Stromboli; detached from command of the Stromboli, 2 September 1848.

He was a commanding lieutenant in the Coast Survey during 1849, 1850–1852; transferred to command of the steamer Walker, 15 July 1852; ordered to duty as light house inspector, 14 December 1852; promoted to commander, 18 April 1855, and ordered to command the steamer Michigan, on the lakes, in September of that year. The Michigan was at St. James on Beaver Island during the rebellion of James Strang, and McBlair reported on the matter.

In January 1861, he was a member of the naval examining board at Annapolis.

=== Civil War career ===
At the outbreak of the American Civil War, McBlair resigned from the U.S. Navy, to take effect from 22 April 1861. He was appointed from Maryland as commander, Confederate States Navy, 19 October 1861; was transferred temporarily to Army service, as captain and chief of artillery, and officer in charge of batteries at Fernandina, Florida, in December. 1861; appointed to temporary rank of colonel, to report to General Trapier, 13 January 1862; was on duty as colonel and chief of artillery. Department of Middle and East Florida, from December 1861, to March 1862. In April 1862 he was given command of the C.S.S. Arkansas, which was then under construction in a Memphis shipyard, when Union troops were approaching; the ship was towed into the Yazoo river, to Greenwood, Mississippi.

He served on the C.S.S. Capitol, in the Mississippi River, May 1862, and commanded the C.S.S. Morgan, until September 1862 when he was relieved by Franklin Buchanan and sent to the Confederate shipyard in Selma, Alabama, to oversee construction of three warships, the C.S.S. Tennessee, C.S.S. Tuscaloosa, and the C.S.S. Huntsville. Buchanan, however, gave preference to work on the Tennessee, his flagship, and McBlair's projects "faltered" because his projects were given a lower priority.

He was appointed again commander, 23 October 1862, to rank from 26 March 1861; was in command at Mobile Bay, 1862–1863; commanding C.S.S. Gaines, December 1863; commanding C.S.S. Tuscaloosa, 1863–1864 and C.S.S. Huntsville, Mobile Bay, April 1864; surrendered with General Joseph E. Johnson, at Greensboro, North Carolina; was paroled, 28 April 1865, and returned to his home, "Bonnie Brae", Baltimore County, Maryland.

=== Post-Civil War career ===
Commissioned colonel and aide-de-camp, on staff of Governor Oden Bowie, 20 April 1869; was appointed colonel and assistant adjutant general by Governor Bowie.
