= Mary Ware (writer) =

American poet

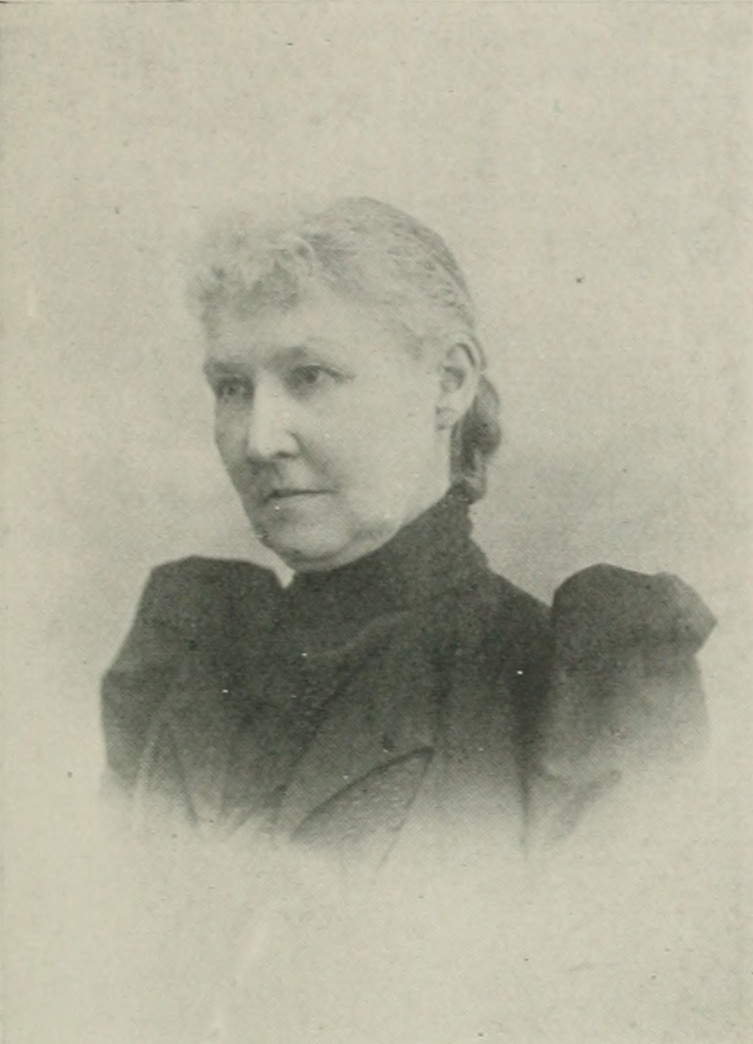
- Photo in A Woman of the Century
- Born: Mary Harris; April 11, 1828; Monroe County, Tennessee, U.S.
- Died: May 25, 1915 (aged 87); Birmingham, Alabama, U.S.
- Occupation: Writer
- Spouse: Horace Ware (m. 1863; died 1890)
- Writing career
- Pen name: Gertrude Glenn
- Genres: poetry; prose

Mary Ware (née, Harris; pen name, Gertrude Glenn; April 11, 1828 – May 25, 1915) was an American "southland" poet and prose writer. She contributed poems to various periodicals for more than fifty years. She also published a limited edition of her poems for private distribution.

== Early life ==
Mary Harris was born in Monroe County, Tennessee, April 11, 1828. Her maiden name, Harris, was prominent in southern literature. Her parents were George and Matilda Roper Harris. He was a successful lawyer living in Madisonville, Tennessee. There were two siblings, brothers, Edmund and Bruce.

== Career ==
In 1844, the father, retiring from the practice of law, removed the family from eastern Tennessee to Shelby County, Alabama, where the literary life of Edmund and Mary began. Eventually, Mary's first poem was entitled "When Nature Wreathed Her Rosy Bowers". Her first verses appeared in the Mobile Advertiser, in 1852. In 1857, Edmund established the Shelby Chronicle, in Columbiana, Alabama, which he conducted with success until he sold it to join the editorial staff of the Mobile Tribune. He died suddenly in Mobile, Alabama.

After a season of mourning her brother, Mary started writing again. She used a pen name, "Gertrude Glenn". Her verses were published by all the leading magazines and periodicals of the South, many of which belonged to the Antebellum era. The South, published in New York City, contained her contributions for twenty years. Besides poetry, she wrote some intonating Native American legends, and a few romances. She was a favorite writer for children in Burke's Weekly (Macon, Georgia).

== Personal life ==
In 1863, she married Horace Ware (died July 1890), who was born in Lynn, Massachusetts, but reared in the South. He was widely known as a pioneer in the development of the iron industries of Alabama and operated the Shelby Iron Company in Shelby, Alabama. In 1871, she was living again in Columbiana, but in 1883, Mary and her husband removed to Birmingham, Alabama where, surrounded by wealth and art, she spent her time in study and work.

After the husband's death in July, 1890, Mary's home circle in Birmingham included four nieces, children of her brother, Bruce. She died in Birmingham, May 25, 1915, at the home of a niece.
