= CSS Phoenix =

Coordinates: 30.60231°N 88.03860°W

History

Confederate States
- Name: Phoenix
- Namesake: Phoenix
- Builder: Confederate Naval Works at Selma
- Laid down: 1863
- Launched: March 1864
- Fate: Scuttled August 7, 1864

General characteristics
- Length: 250 or 152 ft (76.2 or 46.3 m)
- Armament: 6 guns

CSS Phoenix was a Confederate ironclad floating battery built at Selma, Alabama, from 1863 to 1864.

== Huntsville ==
Phoenix was built at the Confederate Naval Works at Selma in 1863 and launched in March 1864. She was severely damaged during the launching and subsequently could not be used as a warship. She was brought to Mobile and scuttled by Confederate forces at the Dog River Bar in Mobile Bay on August 7, 1864. She was blown up a few nights later by Union sailors from the USS Metacomet. The Confederates then burned her to the waterline. The wreck was located in 1985 and was determined to be well preserved.

== Bibliography ==
- Bisbee, Saxon T. (2018). Engines of Rebellion: Confederate Ironclads and Steam Engineering in the American Civil War. Tuscaloosa, Alabama: University of Alabama Press. ISBN 978-0-81731-986-1.
- Canney, Donald L. (2015). The Confederate Steam Navy 1861-1865. Atglen, Pennsylvania: Schiffer Publishing. ISBN 978-0-7643-4824-2.
