= USS Stromboli (1846) =

History

United States
- Name: USS Stromboli
- Acquired: by purchase, 1846
- Commissioned: 18 March 1847
- Decommissioned: 6 September 1848
- Fate: Sold, 1848

General characteristics
- Type: Brig
- Displacement: 180 long tons (183 t)
- Length: 80 ft (24 m)
- Beam: 22 ft 8 in (6.91 m)
- Draft: 8 ft (2.4 m)
- Propulsion: Sails
- Armament: 1 × 10 in (250 mm) columbiad

USS Stromboli was a bomb brig of the United States Navy used in the Mexican–American War.

In 1846, the United States Navy purchased the brig Howard at Boston, Massachusetts to strengthen its forces for the Mexican–American War. Commissioned on 18 March 1847 Stromboli, named for the island of Stromboli in the Tyrrhenian Sea, the ship sailed for the Gulf of Mexico under the command of Commander William S. Walker.

Stromboli performed blockade duty in the Bay of Campeche, especially off the mouth of the Coatzacoalcos River. In mid-June, she sailed to the mouth of the Tabasco River. On 14 June, she and Bonito were towed across the bar into the river as Commodore Matthew Calbraith Perry's squadron occupied Frontera. The force then moved upstream and took Tabasco the following day.

Stromboli later returned to blockade duty off the mouth of the Coatzacoalcos. That summer, the ship's crew was stricken by yellow fever, but she continued to help guard the U.S. Army water communications through the winter and spring.

In July 1848, Stromboli sailed home, and she was decommissioned on 6 September 1848. She was sold later that year.
