= Spanish River (Alabama) =

Location
- Country: United States
- State: Alabama

Physical characteristics
- Source
  - coordinates: 30.772°N 88.022°W
- Mouth
  - coordinates: 30.665°N 88.021°W
- Length: 8 mi (13 km)

The Spanish River is a brackish distributary river that forms part of the border between Baldwin and Mobile counties in Alabama. It is approximately 8 miles (13 km) long and is influenced by tides. It begins at the northernmost tip of Blakeley Island, where it diverges from the Mobile River, at 30.772°N 88.0222°W. From there it flows along the eastern edge of Blakeley and Pinto islands, and discharges into Mobile Bay south of Pinto Island, at 30.665°N 88.021°W.

It contains two significant shipwrecks that date to the American Civil War period. The Confederate ironclads, CSS Tuscaloosa and CSS Huntsville, were both scuttled in the river on April 12, 1865, to prevent their capture following the surrender of the city of Mobile.

== See also ==
- List of Alabama rivers
