= Shelby, Alabama =

- Census-designated place
- Location of Shelby in Shelby County, Alabama.
- Coordinates: 33°06′57″N 86°35′15″W
- Country: United States
- State: Alabama
- County: Shelby

Area
  - Total: 19.01 sq mi (49.24 km^{2})
  - Land: 18.76 sq mi (48.59 km^{2})
  - Water: 0.25 sq mi (0.66 km^{2})
- Elevation: 489 ft (149 m)

Population (2020)
  - Total: 940
  - Density: 50.1/sq mi (19.35/km^{2})
- Time zone: UTC-6 (Central (CST))
  - Summer (DST): UTC-5 (CDT)
- Postal code: 35143
- Area codes: 205, 659
- GNIS feature ID: 2582698

Shelby is a census-designated place and unincorporated community in Shelby County, Alabama, United States. As of the 2020 census, Shelby had a population of 940. The area is near Lay Lake and Waxahatchee Creek. Shelby Iron Park is located at the heart of the area. Two sites in Shelby, The Brick House and the Old Shelby Hotel, are listed on the Alabama Register of Landmarks and Heritage.

== History ==
Shelby was home to the Shelby Iron Company. During the American Civil War, iron plating from the iron works was used on the CSS Tennessee, CSS Huntsville, and CSS Tuscaloosa. At this time, Shelby was connected to Columbiana by the Shelby Iron Company Railroad, which allowed the iron works to be connected to the Alabama and Tennessee River Railroad. A detachment of General Emory Upton's division of Wilson's Raiders destroyed the ironworks on March 31, 1865.

== Demographics ==
Historical population
Census	Pop.	Note	%±
1880	567		—
1890	753		32.8%
2010	1,044		—
2020	940		−10.0%
U.S. Decennial Census

Shelby Iron Works was listed on the 1880 U.S. Census and was shortened to Shelby in 1890 as an incorporated town. It did not appear again as a separately returned community until 120 years later in 2010 when it was listed as a census designated place in the 2010 U.S. census.

Shelby CDP, Alabama – Racial and ethnic composition Note: the US Census treats Hispanic/Latino as an ethnic category. This table excludes Latinos from the racial categories and assigns them to a separate category. Hispanics/Latinos may be of any race.
Race / Ethnicity (NH = Non-Hispanic)	Pop 2010	Pop 2020	% 2010	% 2020
White alone (NH)	934	800	89.46%	85.11%
Black or African American alone (NH)	70	63	6.70%	6.70%
Native American or Alaska Native alone (NH)	1	0	0.10%	0.00%
Asian alone (NH)	2	3	0.19%	0.32%
Native Hawaiian or Pacific Islander alone (NH)	0	0	0.00%	0.00%
Other race alone (NH)	0	1	0.00%	0.11%
Mixed race or Multiracial (NH)	13	33	1.25%	3.51%
Hispanic or Latino (any race)	24	40	2.30%	4.26%
Total	1,044	940	100.00%	100.00%
