= Selma, Alabama, in the American Civil War =

Selma, Alabama, during the American Civil War was one of the South's main military manufacturing centers, producing tons of supplies and munitions, and turning out Confederate warships. The Selma Ordnance and Naval Foundry complex included a naval foundry, shipyard, army arsenal, and gunpowder works. Following the Battle of Selma, Union Maj. Gen. James H. Wilson's troops destroyed Selma's army arsenal and factories, as well as much of the city.

== Importance of Selma to the Confederacy ==
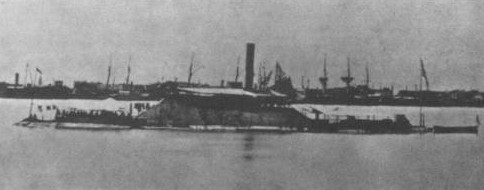
The CSS Tennessee in 1864

Because of its central location, production facilities, and rail connections, the advantages of Selma as a site for production of cartridges, saltpeter, powder, shot and shell, rifles, cannon and steam rams soon became apparent to the Confederacy. By 1863, most materiel was manufactured in Selma, employing at least ten thousand people. Selma, along with the Tredegar Iron Works in Richmond, was one of two sites producing the Brooke rifle, a rifled naval and coast defense cannon designed by John Mercer Brooke. The hulls for several Confederate ironclads, including the CSS Huntsville, CSS Phoenix, CSS Tennessee, and CSS Tuscaloosa were laid at the Confederate Navy Yard there. CSS Nashville was also partially outfitted in Selma.

== Early Federal attempts to seize Selma ==
The capacities and importance of Selma, in its relation to the Confederate war effort, had been evident to Northern strategists and too great to be overlooked by the Federal authorities as early as 1862. But reaching it with a Federal force was not attempted early in the war, as its distance from the front lines made it an extremely difficult target. As Selma grew in importance to the Confederate forces, the greater became the necessity to capture it. Brigadier General Benjamin Grierson, with a cavalry force from Memphis, was intercepted and returned in 1863. Major General William Tecumseh Sherman made an effort to reach it in February 1864, but after advancing as far as Meridian, within 107 miles (172 km) of Selma, he retreated to the Mississippi River. General Lovell Rousseau made a dash in the direction of Selma in 1864, but was misled by his guides and instead struck 90 miles (140 km) east of the city.

== Battle of Selma ==
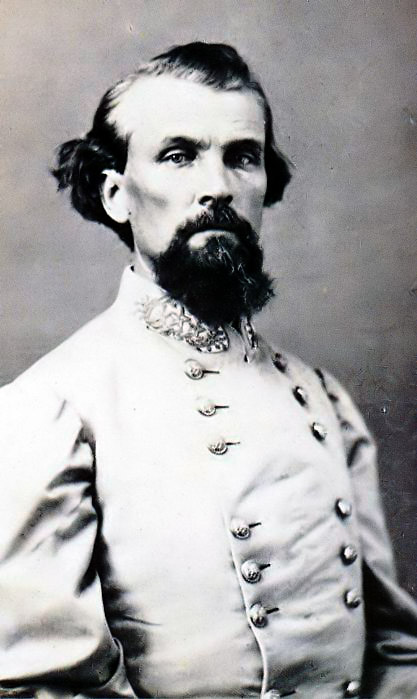
Gen. Nathan Bedford Forrest

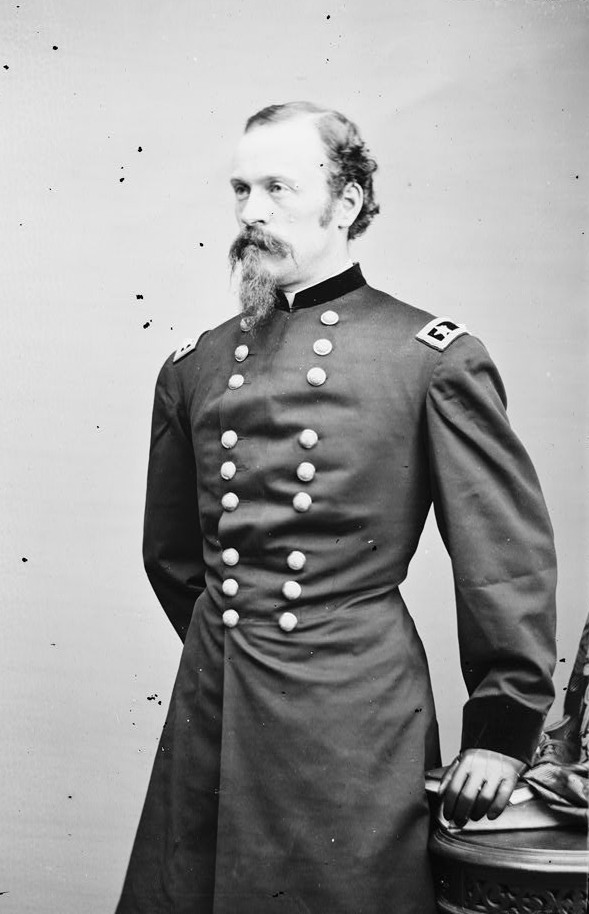
Gen. James H. Wilson

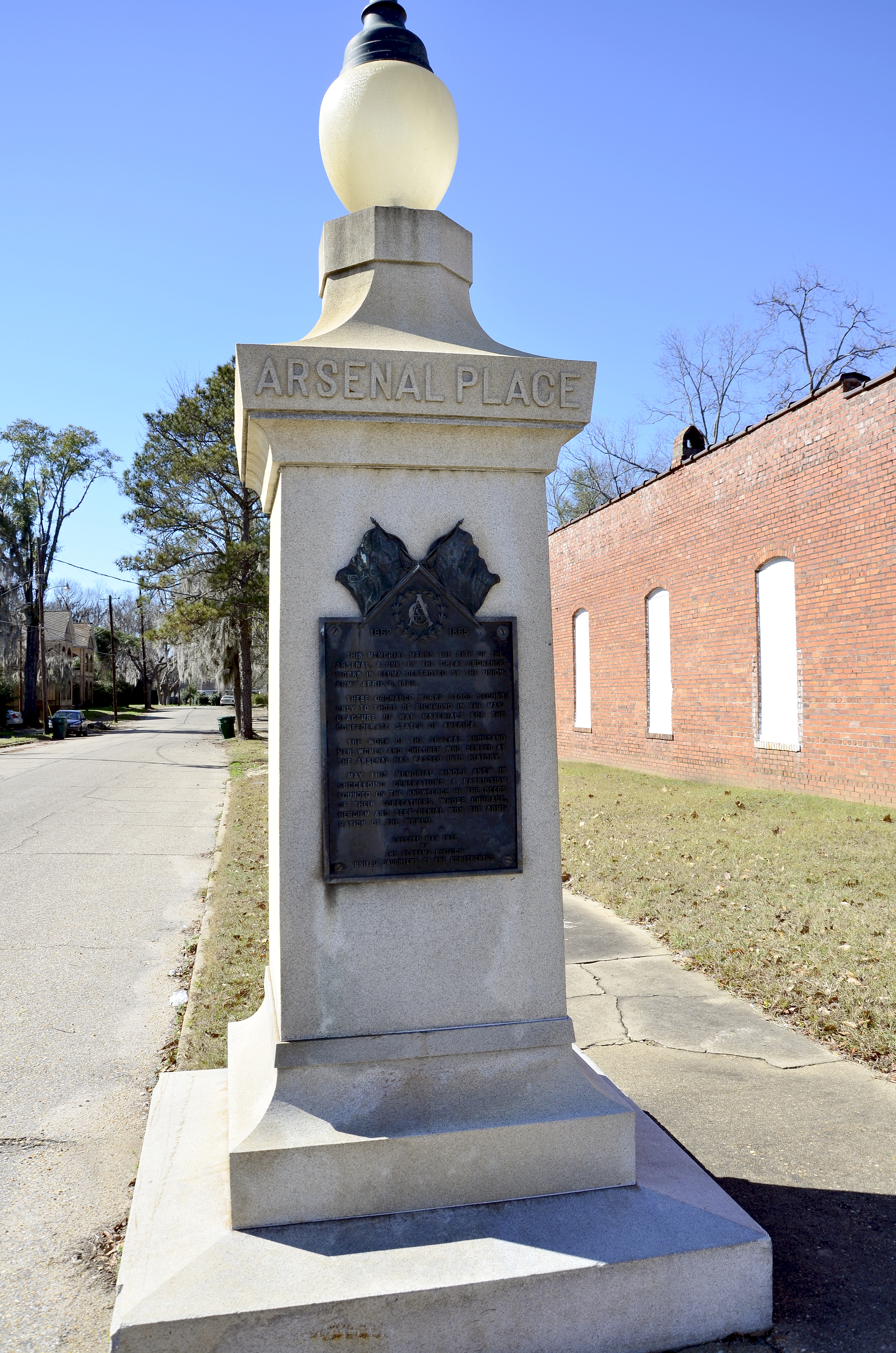
Arsenal Place Memorial, erected in 1931 by the United Daughters of the Confederacy to recognize the location of the Confederate ordnance works destroyed by the Union Army on April 6, 1865

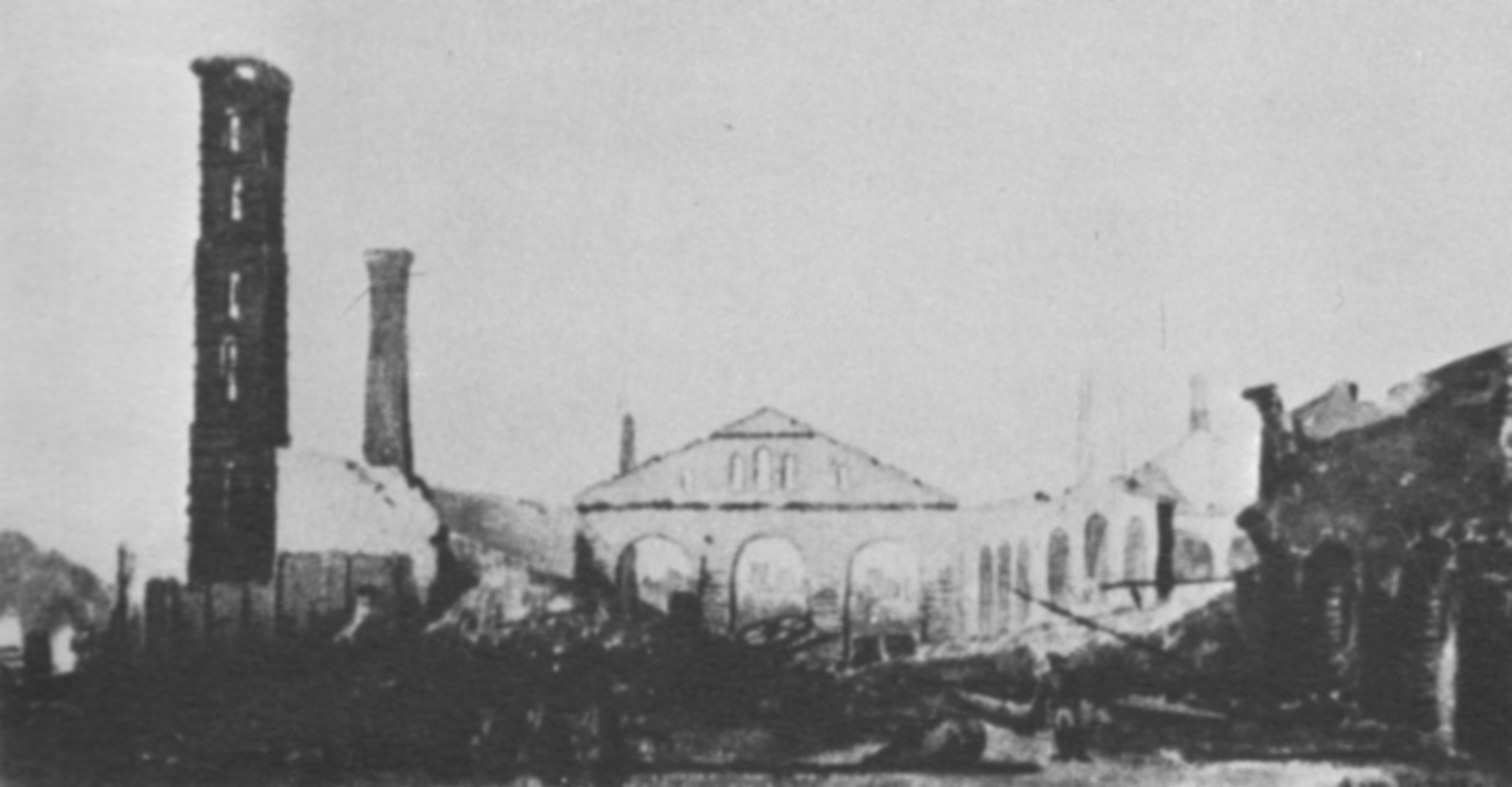
Ruins of the Confederate States Naval Foundry at Selma in 1865

Major General James H. Wilson detached Brig. Gen. John T. Croxton's brigade to destroy all Confederate property at Tuscaloosa, Alabama. After capturing a Confederate courier who carried dispatches from General Nathan Bedford Forrest describing the strengths and dispositions of his scattered forces, Wilson also sent a brigade to destroy the bridge across the Cahaba River at Centreville. This action effectively cut off most of Forrest's reinforcements. This began a running fight that did not end until after the fall of Selma.

On the afternoon of April 1, 1865, after skirmishing all morning, Wilson's advanced guard ran into Forrest's line of battle at Ebenezer Church, where the Randolph Road intersected the main Selma road. Here Forrest had hoped to bring his entire force to bear on Wilson. However delays caused by flooding plus earlier contact with the enemy enabled Forrest to muster less than 2,000 men, a large number of whom were not veterans but militia consisting of old men and young boys.

The outnumbered and outgunned Confederates fought for more than an hour as more Union cavalry and artillery deployed on the field. Forrest himself was wounded by a saber-wielding Union captain whom he killed with his revolver. Finally, a Union cavalry charge with carbines blazing broke the Confederate militia causing Forrest to be flanked on his right. He was forced to retreat under severe pressure.

Early the next morning Forrest arrived at Selma, "horse and rider covered in blood." He advised Gen. Richard Taylor, departmental commander, to leave the city. Taylor did so after giving Forrest command of the defense.

Selma was protected by three miles of fortifications which ran in a semicircle around the city. They were anchored on the north and south by the Alabama River. The works had been built two years earlier, and while neglected for the most part since, were still formidable. They were 8 to 12 feet (3.7 m) high, 15 feet (4.6 m) thick at the base, with a ditch 4 feet (1.2 m) wide and 5 feet (1.5 m) deep along the front. In front of this was a picket fence of heavy posts planted in the ground, 5 feet (1.5 m) high, and sharpened at the top. At prominent positions, earthen forts were built with artillery in position to cover the ground over which an assault would have to be made.

Forrest's defenders consisted of his Tennessee escort company, McCullough's Missouri Regiment, Crossland's Kentucky Brigade, Roddey's Alabama Brigade, Frank Armstrong's Mississippi Brigade, General Daniel W. Adams' state reserves, and the citizens of Selma who were "volunteered" to man the works. Altogether this force numbered less than 4,000, only half of who were dependable. The Selma fortifications were built to be defended by 20,000 men. Forrest's soldiers had to stand 10 to 12 feet (3.7 m) apart in the works.

Wilson's force arrived in front of the Selma fortifications at 2 p.m. He had placed Gen. Eli Long's division across the Summerfield Road with the Chicago Board of Trade Battery in support. He had Maj. Gen. Emory Upton's division placed across the Range Line Road with Battery I, 4th U.S. Artillery in support. Altogether, Wilson had 9,000 troops available for the assault.

The Federal commander's plan was for Upton to send in a 300-man detachment after dark to cross the swamp on the Confederate right, enter the works, and begin a flanking movement toward the center moving along the line of fortifications. Then, a single gun from Upton's artillery would signal the attack by the entire Federal Corps.

At 5 p.m., however, Gen. Long's ammunition train in the rear was attacked by advance elements of Forrest's scattered forces coming toward Selma. Both Long and Upton had positioned significant numbers of troops in their rear for just such an event. However, Long decided to commence his assault against the Selma fortifications to neutralize the enemy attack in his rear.

Long's troops attacked in a single rank in three main lines, dismounted with Spencers carbines blazing, supported by their own artillery fire. The Confederates replied with heavy small arms and artillery fire of their own. The Southern artillery, in one of the many ironies of the Civil War, only had solid shot on hand, while just a short distance away was an arsenal which produced tons of canister, a highly effective anti-personnel ammunition.

The Federals suffered many casualties (including General Long himself) but not enough to break up the attack. Once the Union Army reached the works, there was vicious hand-to-hand fighting. Many soldiers were struck down with clubbed muskets. But, in less than 30 minutes, Long's men had captured the works protecting the Summerfield Road.

Meanwhile, General Upton, observing Long's success, ordered his division forward. The story was much the same for his men as on Long's front. Soon, U.S. flags could be seen waving over the works from Range Line Road to Summerfield Road.

After the outer works fell, General Wilson himself led the 4th U.S. Cavalry Regiment in a mounted charge down the Range Line Road toward the unfinished inner line of works. The retreating Confederate forces, upon reaching the inner works, all rallied and poured a devastating fire into the charging column. This broke up the charge and sent General Wilson sprawling to the ground when his favorite horse was wounded. He quickly remounted his stricken mount and ordered a dismounted assault by several regiments.

Mixed units of Confederate troops had also occupied the Selma railroad depot and the adjoining banks of the railroad bed to make a stand next to the Plantersville Road (present day Broad Street). The fighting there was heavy, but by 7 p.m., the superior numbers of Union troops had managed to flank the Southern positions causing them to abandon the depot as well as the inner line of works.

In the darkness, the Union rounded up hundreds of prisoners, but hundreds more escaped down the Burnsville Road, including Generals Forrest, Armstrong, and Roddey. To the west, many Confederate soldiers fought the pursuing Union soldiers all the way down to the eastern side of Valley Creek. They escaped in the darkness by swimming across the Alabama River near the mouth of Valley Creek (where the present day Battle of Selma Reenactment is held.)

The Union soldiers looted the city that night while many businesses and private residences were burned. They spent the next week destroying the arsenal and naval foundry. Then they left Selma heading to Montgomery.
