= Shelby Iron Company =

Coordinates: 33.1121°N 86.5946°W

Shelby Iron Works Park
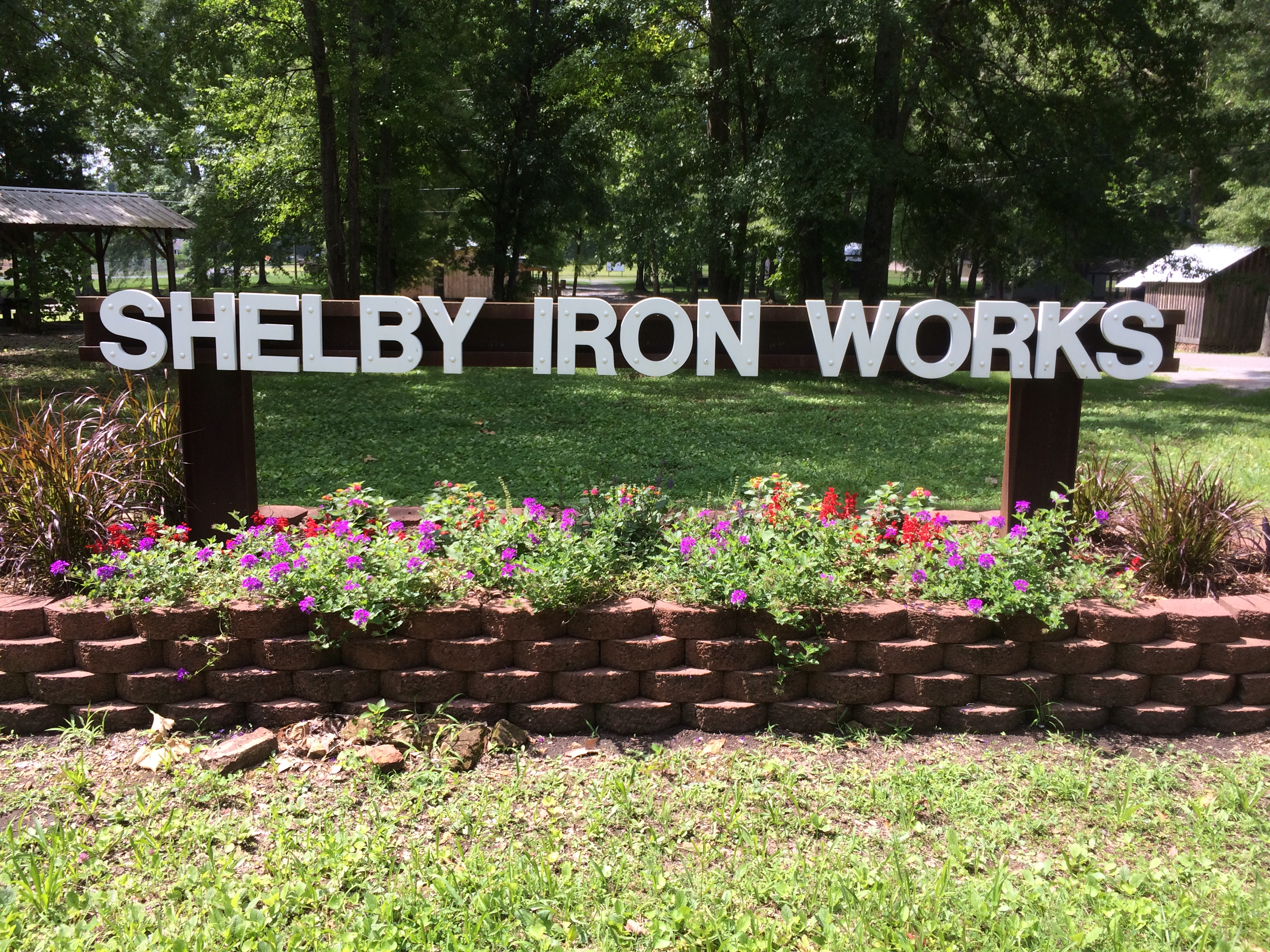
- Location: 10268 County Road 42, Shelby, AL 35143
- Type: Local History Museum

The Shelby Iron Company was an iron manufacturing company that operated an ironworks in Shelby, Alabama. The iron company produced iron for the Confederate States of America and was destroyed towards the end of the American Civil War. The company continued to produce iron until the early part of the 20th century.

== History ==
The genesis of Shelby Iron Works (also known as Shelby Iron Company) dates back to December 29, 1842, when Horace Ware was able to purchase land south of Columbiana, AL from Green B. and Sara Seale. Today this site is known as the town of Shelby, Alabama. Horace Ware was also able to acquire timberland and hematite ore properties throughout Shelby County. With the acquisition of these materials Horace Ware began to build a cold blast iron furnace. The Shelby Iron Works Company started with meager beginnings by only producing 5 tons of cold blast iron a day because of its capacity. The lone furnace stack was built out of brick and stone and only stood 30 feet high. During the American Civil War, iron plating from the iron works was used on the CSS Tennessee, CSS Huntsville, and CSS Tuscaloosa, and in making cannons and shells manufactured by Churchill and Sons in Columbiana. The ironworks was connected to Columbiana by the Shelby Iron Company Railroad, which allowed the iron works to be connected to the Alabama and Tennessee River Railroad. A detachment of General Emory Upton's division of Wilson's Raiders destroyed the ironworks on March 31, 1865.

== Gallery ==
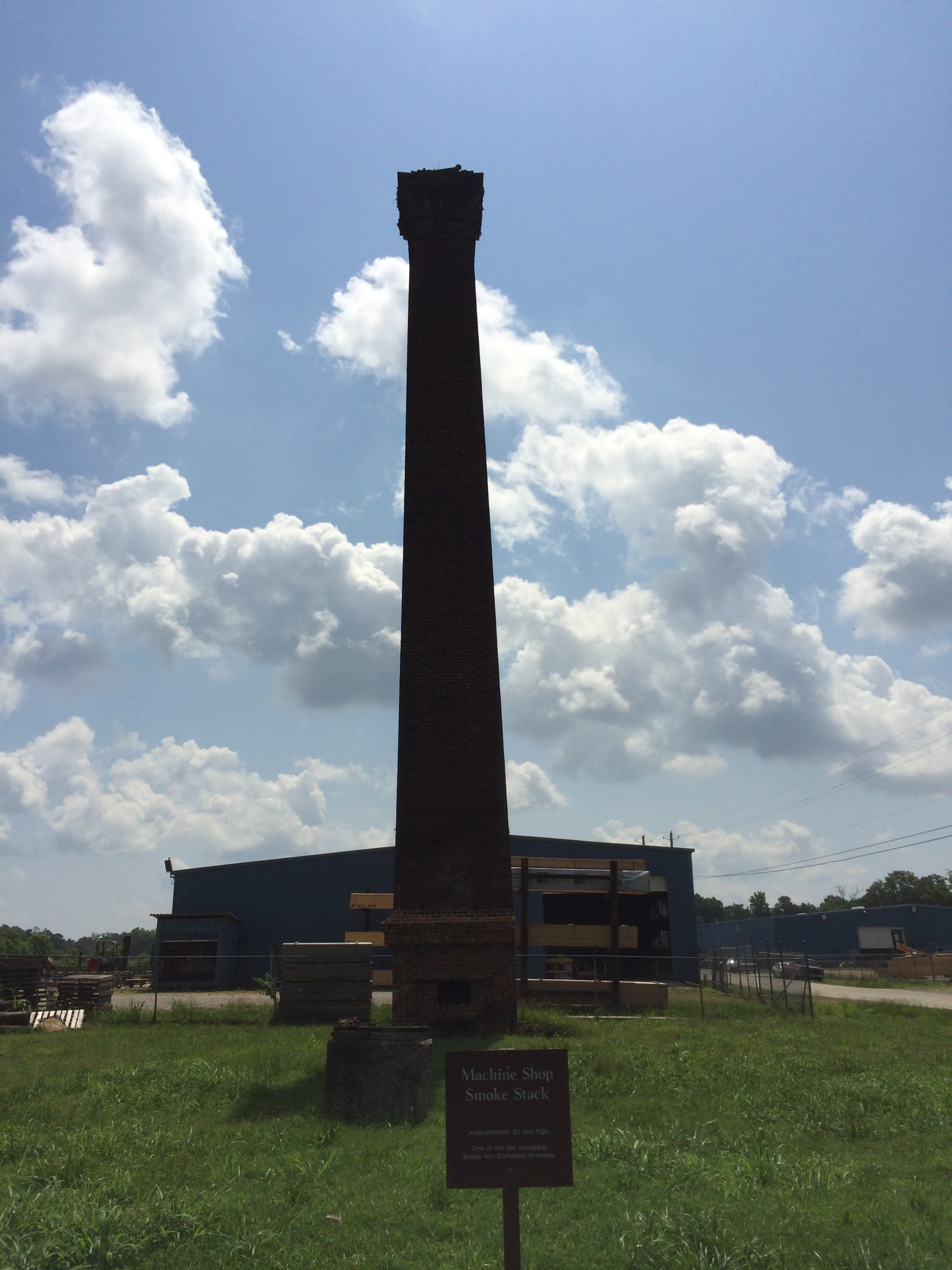
The remaining smoke stack from the machine shop.

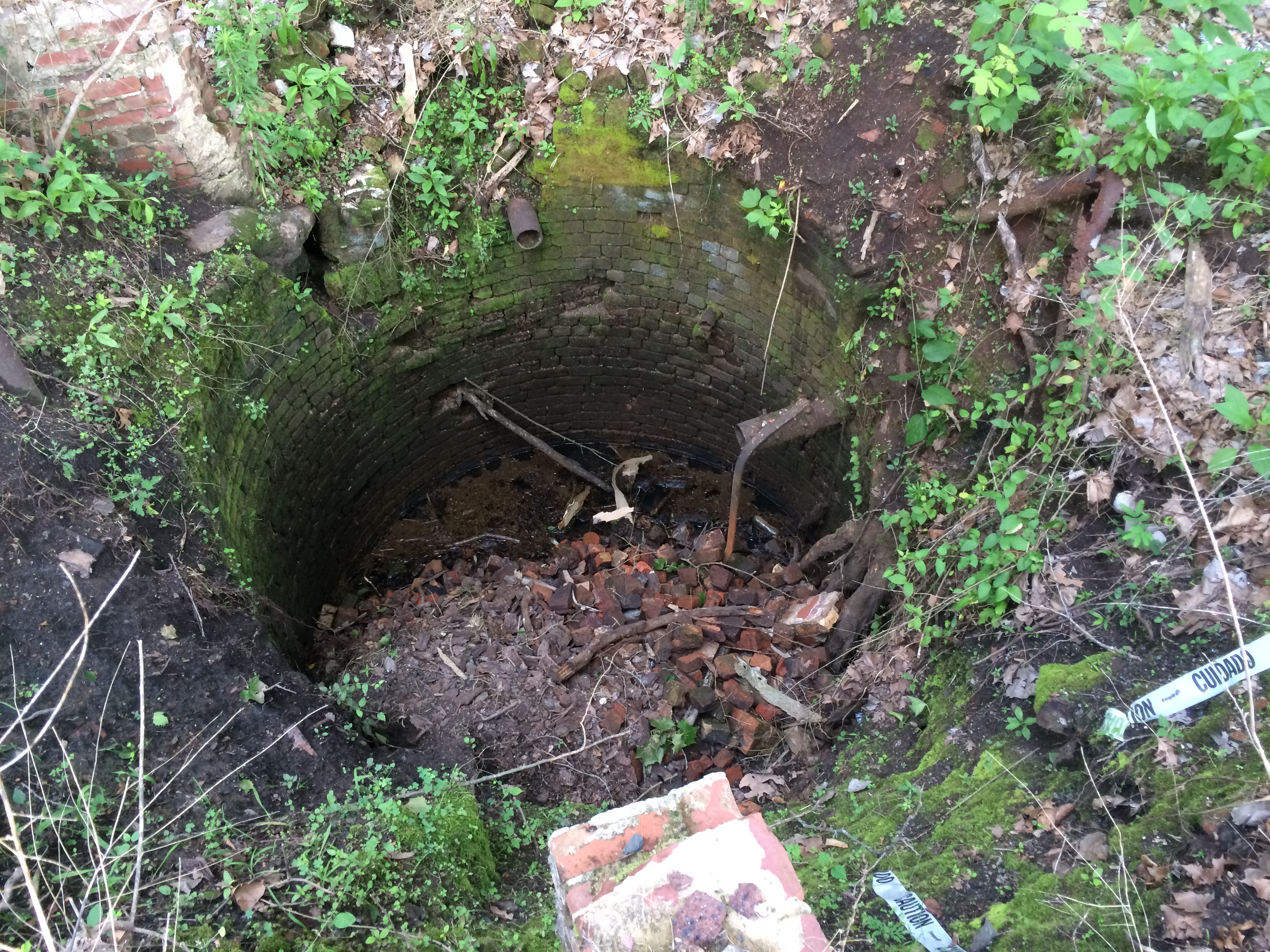
A large, brick-lined cistern.

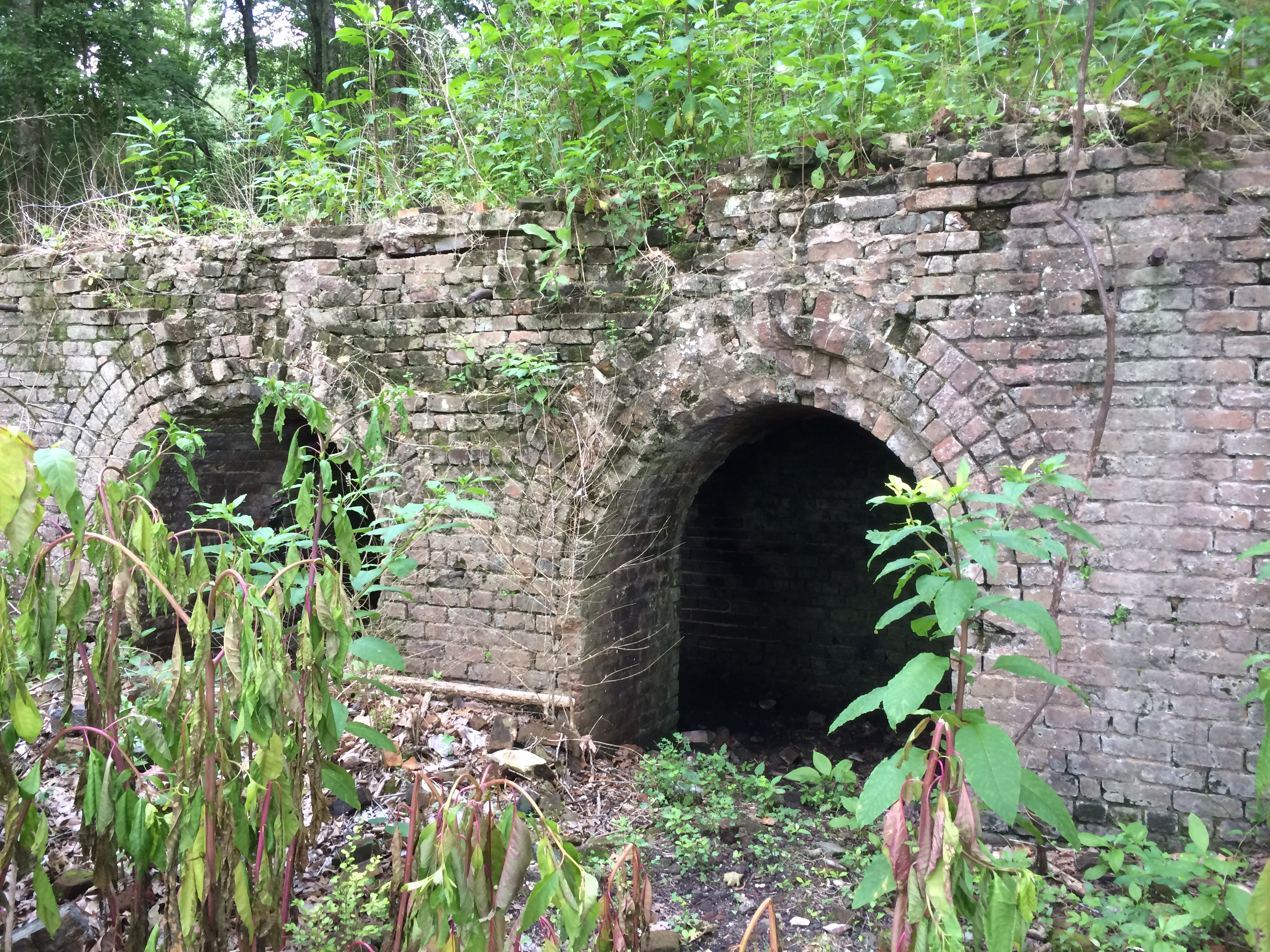
Brick foundations of the blast furnaces.

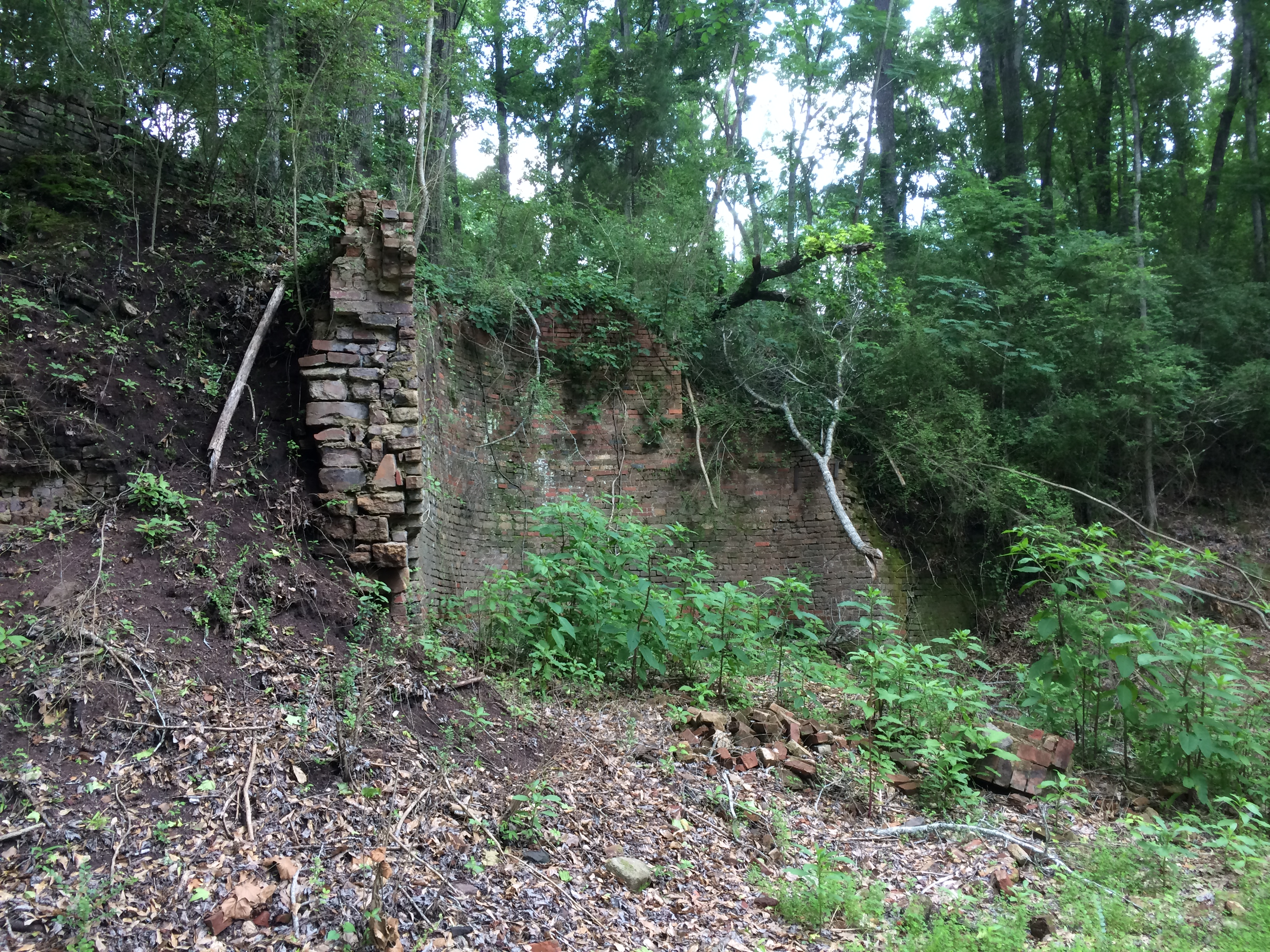
A large brick retaining wall behind the site of the blast furnaces.

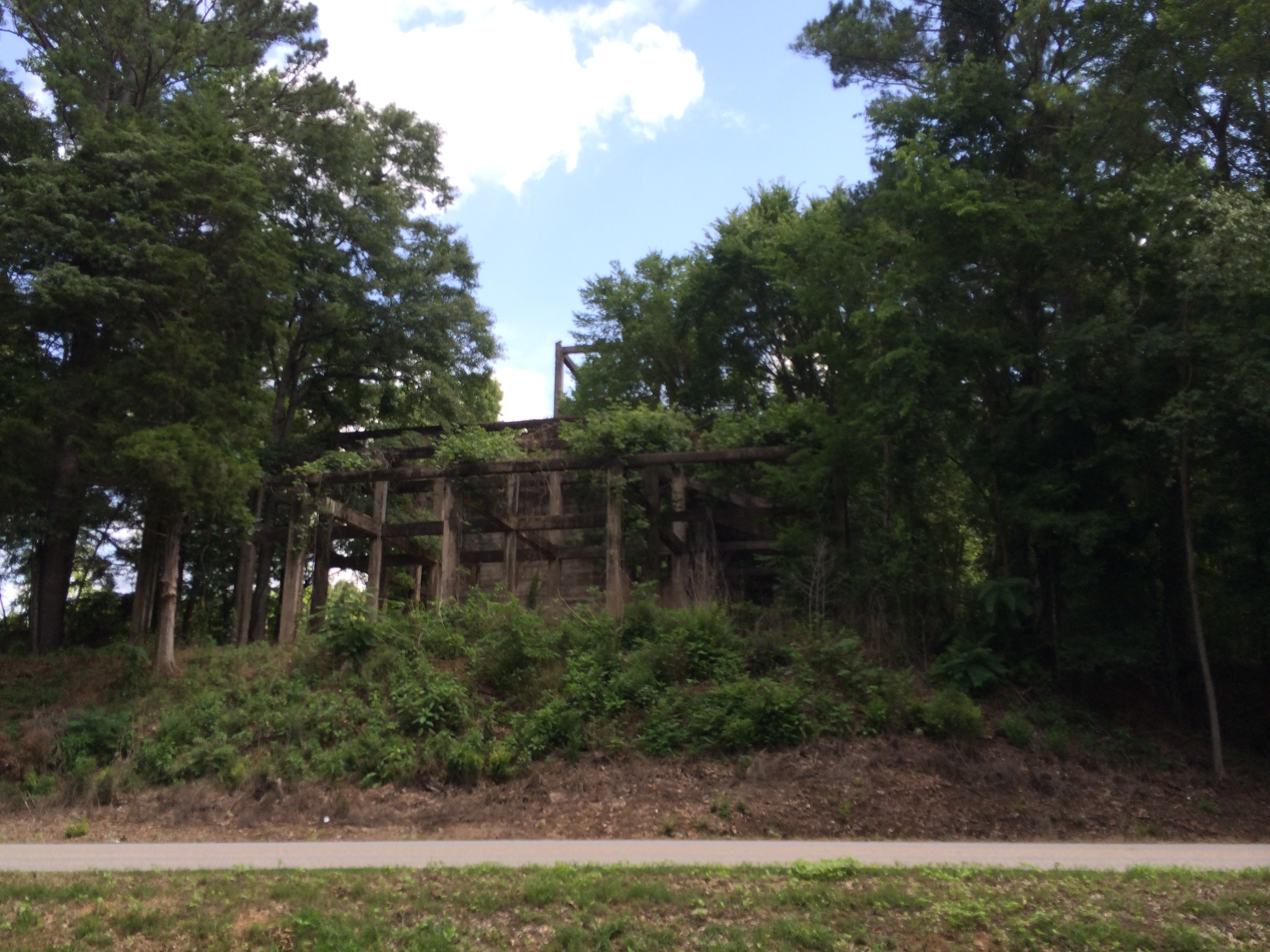
Concrete skeleton of the building operated by the Shelby Chemical Company to make wood alcohol from charcoal during World War I.

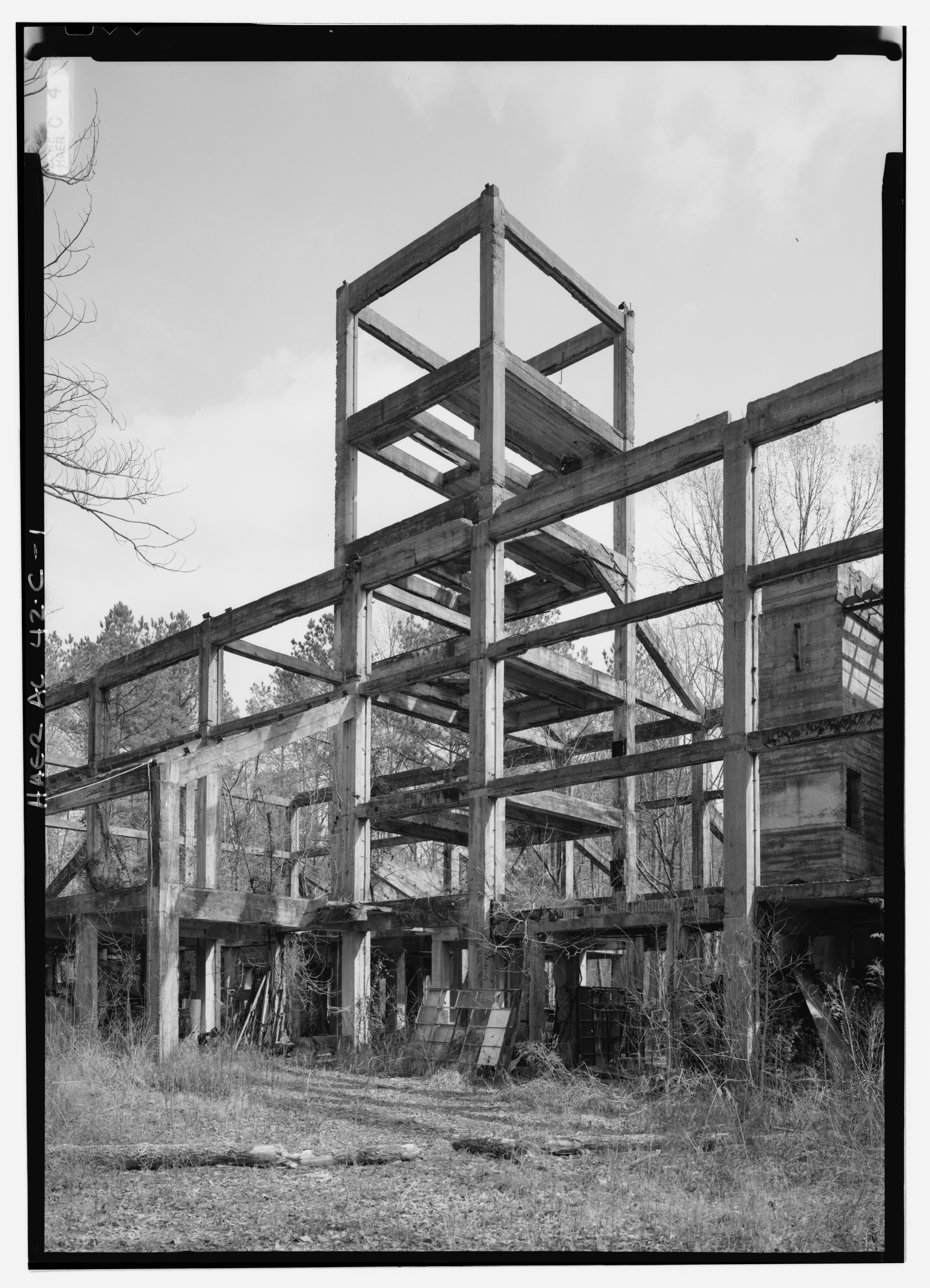
Chemical plant structure

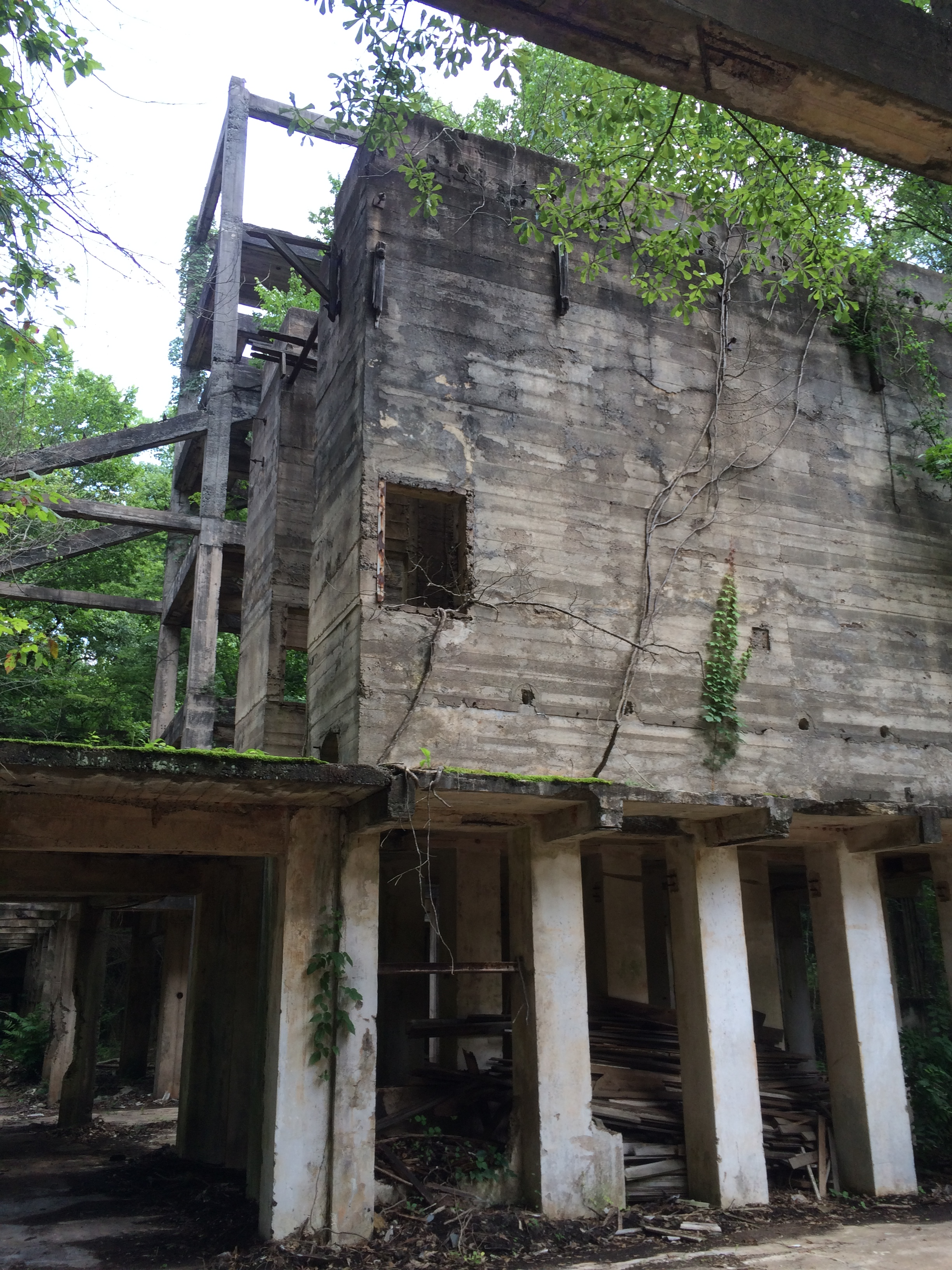
Interior of the remnants of the chemical plant.

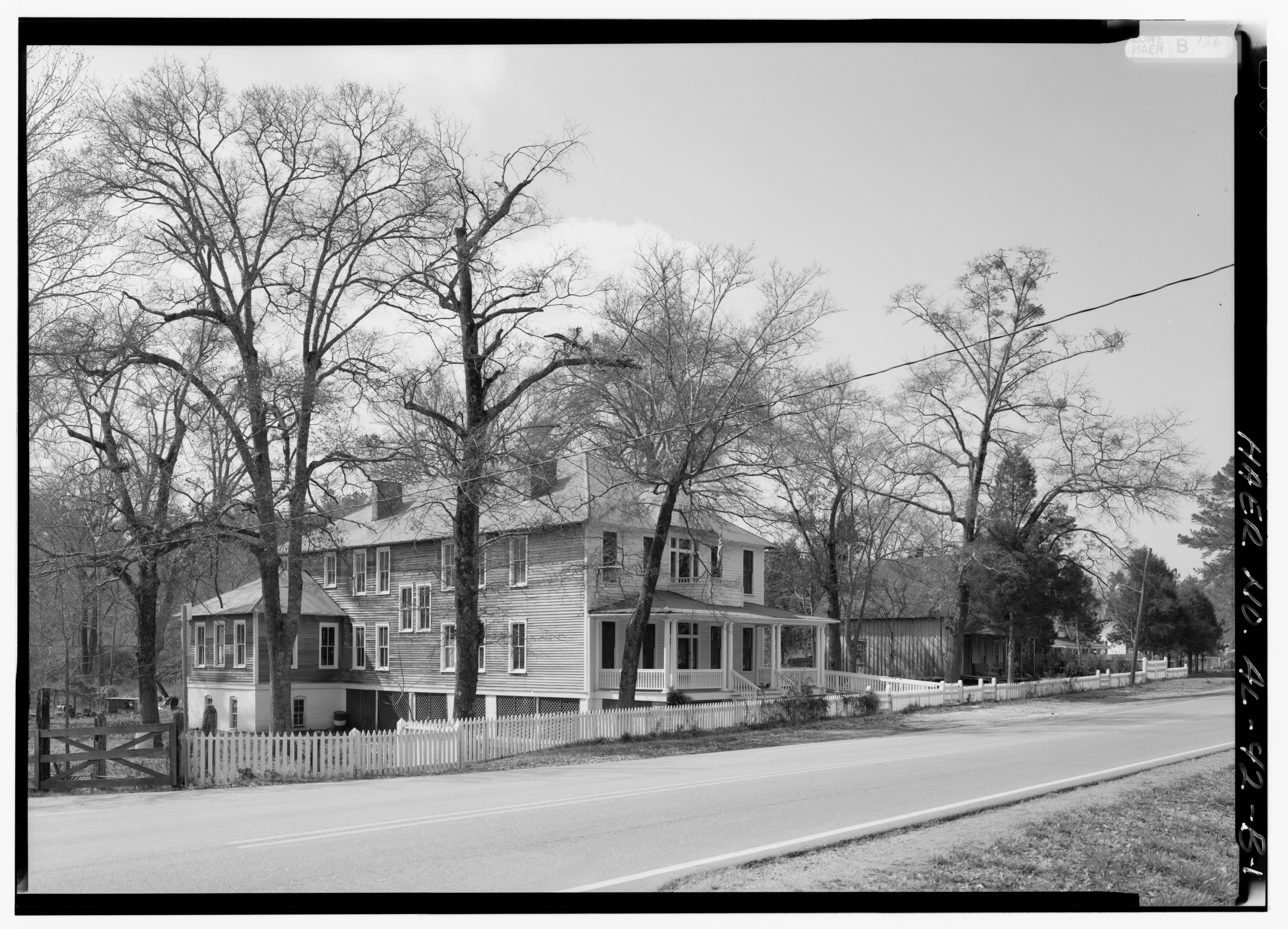
Shelby Hotel

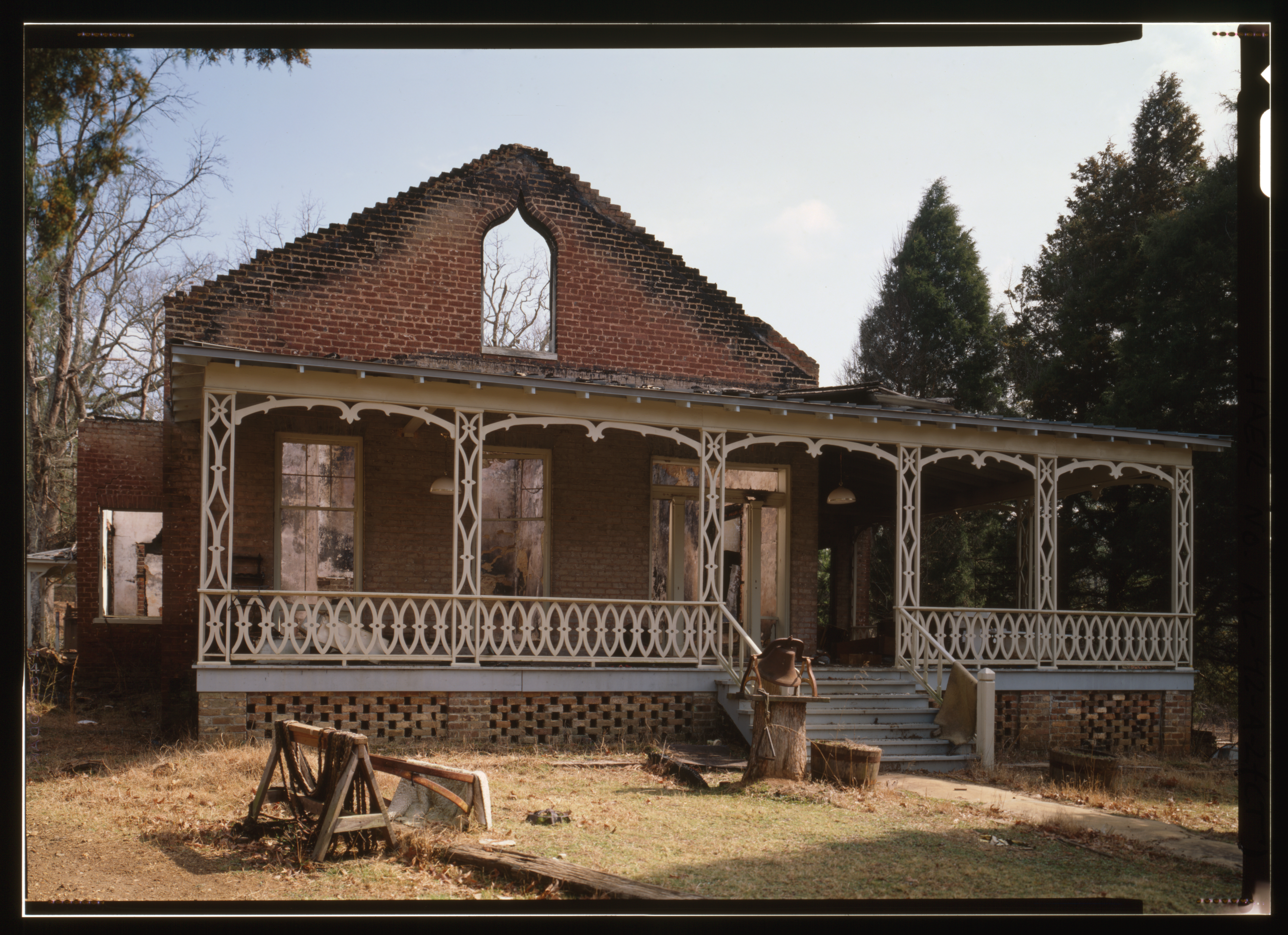
Iron Master's House

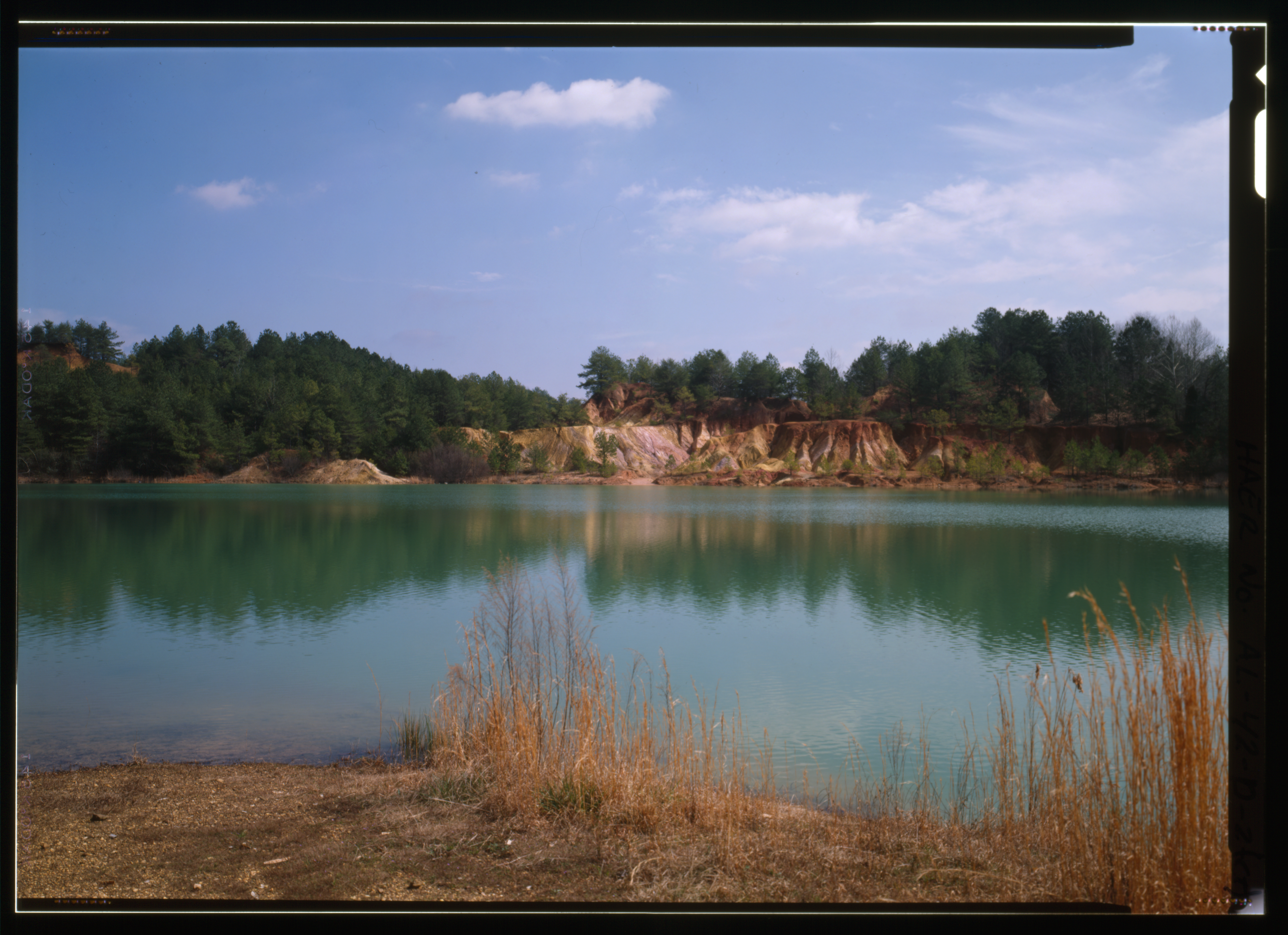
Blue Hole Lake (former brown iron ore mining pit)

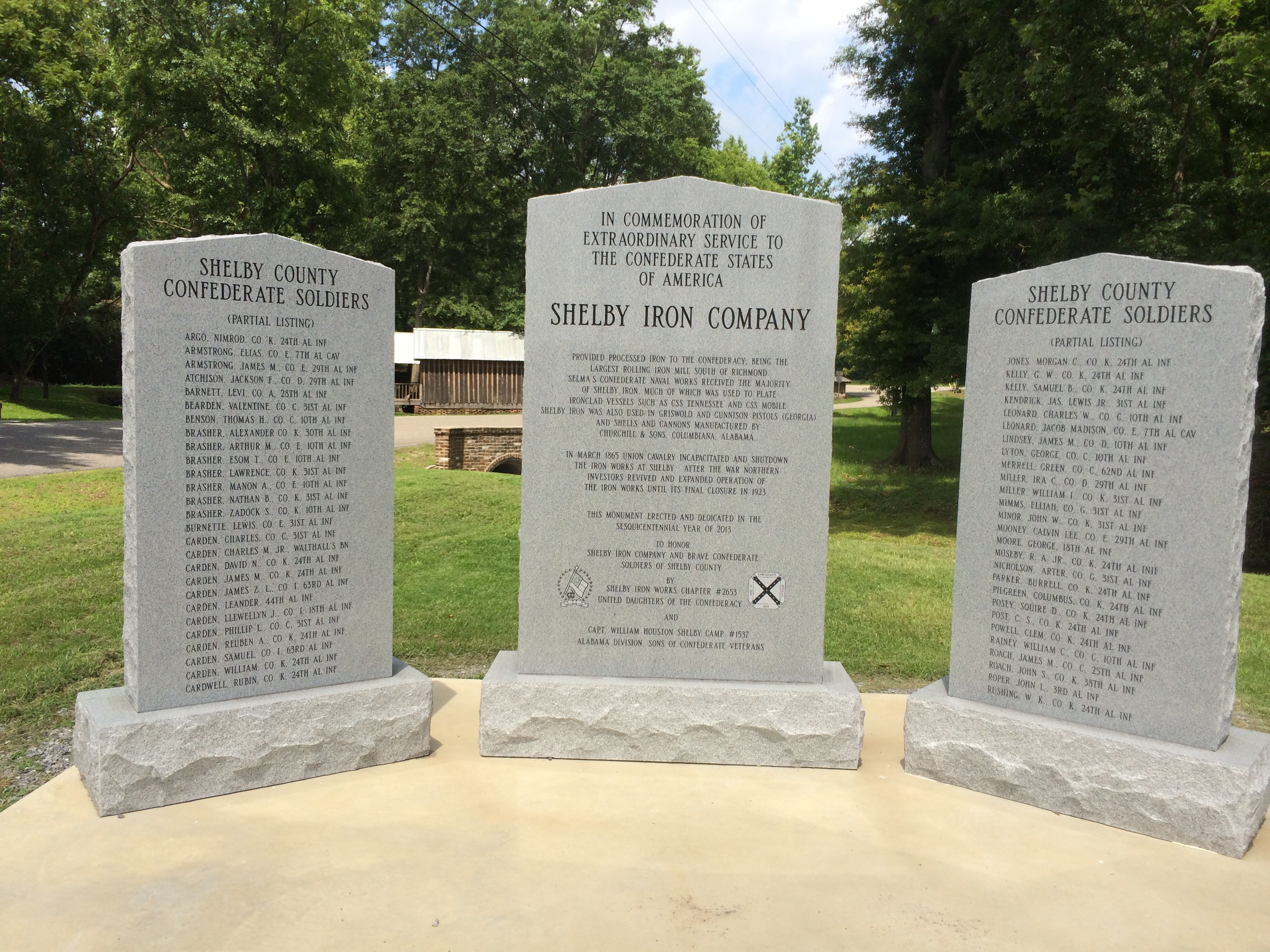
Memorial honoring Confederate soldiers and workers.

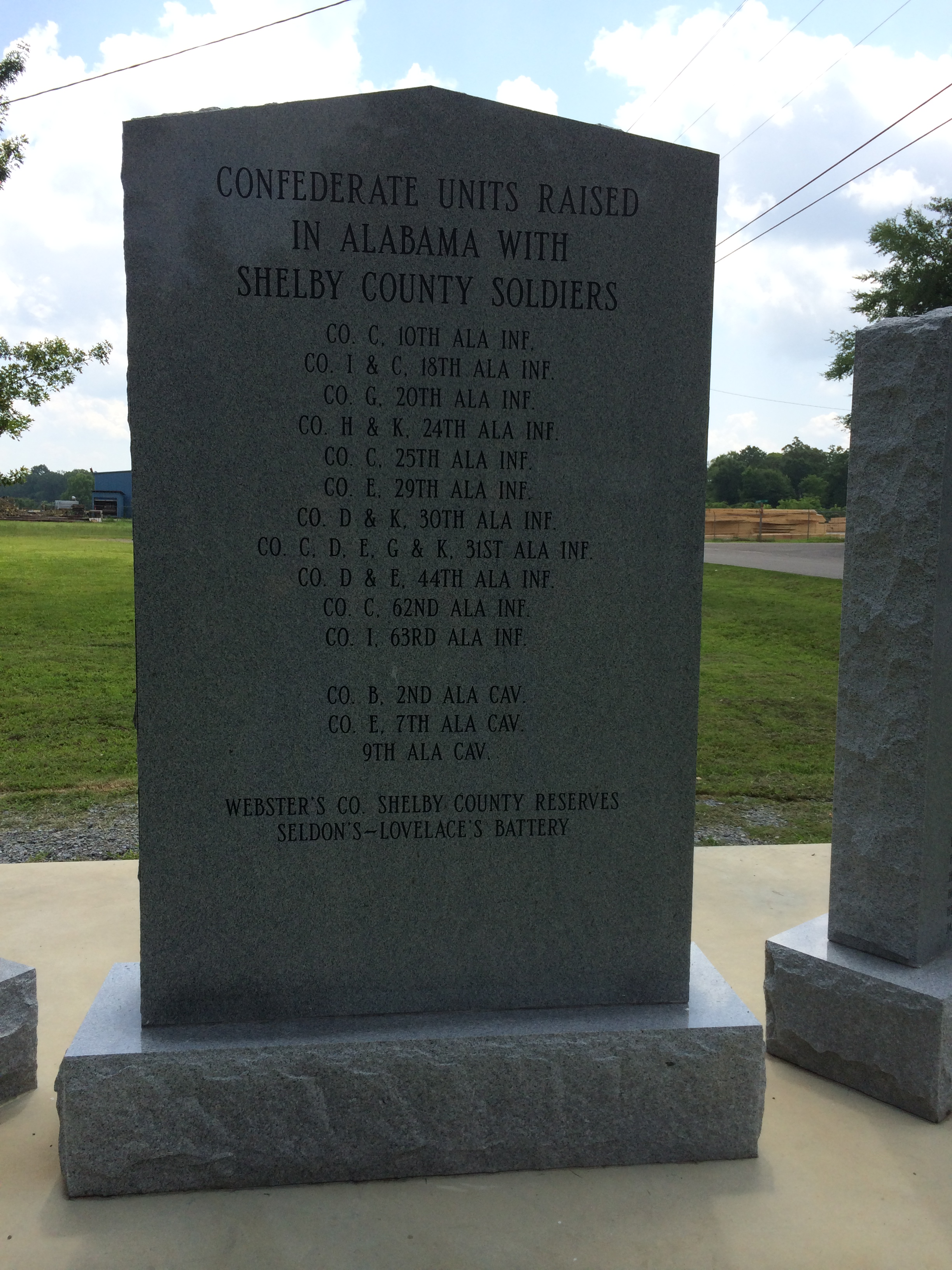
Reverse of memorial listing Confederate units that included soldiers from Shelby County, Alabama

== See also ==
- Birmingham District
- Brierfield Furnace
- Tannehill Ironworks
