= CSS Huntsville =

Coordinates: 30.76924°N 88.02053°W

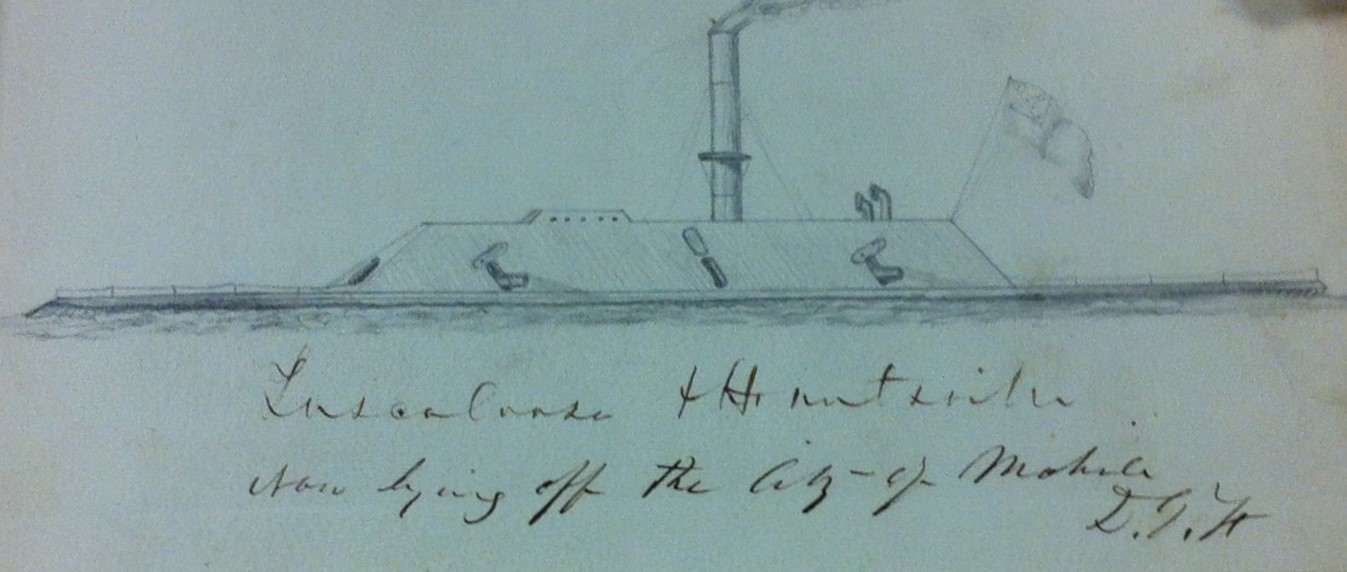
- Sketch of CSS Huntsville, Mobile, Alabama, 1864

History

Confederate States
- Name: Huntsville
- Namesake: Huntsville, Alabama
- Ordered: May 1, 1862
- Builder: Confederate Naval Works at Selma
- Launched: February 7, 1863
- Completed: August 1, 1863
- Out of service: April 12, 1865
- Fate: Scuttled in Spanish River to prevent capture

General characteristics
- Length: 150 or 152 ft (45.7 or 46.3 m)
- Beam: 32 ft (9.8 m)
- Draught: 7 ft (2.1 m)
- Propulsion: Steam
- Speed: 4 knots (7.4 km/h; 4.6 mph)
- Complement: 40
- Armament: 1: 6.4-inch (163 mm) Muzzle-loading rifle; 3–4: 32-pounder smoothbores

CSS Huntsville was a Confederate ironclad floating battery built at Selma, Alabama, from 1862 to 1863 during the American Civil War.

== History ==
Huntsville was ordered on May 1, 1862, by the Confederate States Navy. She was launched at the Confederate Naval Works at Selma on February 7, 1863, and finished in Mobile. She was finally delivered on August 1, 1863. She was only partially armored, with the armor plate delivered by the Shelby Iron Company of Shelby, Alabama, and the Atlanta Rolling Mill. She had defective engines that were obtained from a river steamer and an incomplete armament, so was assigned to guard the waters around Mobile.

Huntsville escaped up the Spanish River following the Battle of Mobile Bay on August 5, 1864. The city of Mobile held out another eight months, with the upper portion of Mobile Bay remaining in Confederate hands. She, along with the CSS Tuscaloosa, was scuttled to prevent capture on April 12, 1865, following the surrender of the city. The wreck lies where the Spanish River splits off from the Mobile River on the north side of Blakeley Island, just north of Mobile, until being located in 1985.
