= Randolph Mott =

American entrepreneur

Randolph Lawler Mott
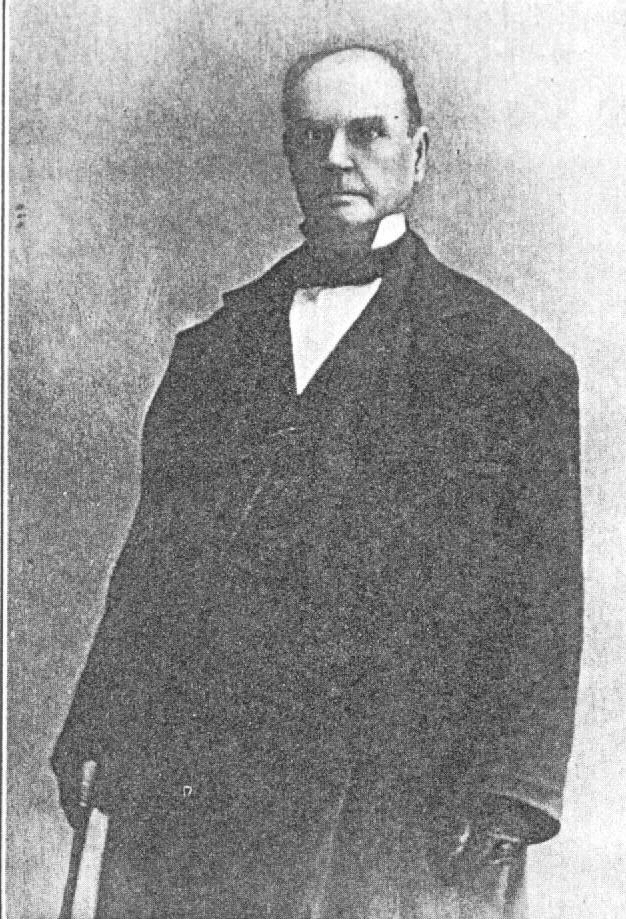
- from The Last Battle of the Civil War, 1915
- Born: August 9, 1799; Fauquier, Co., Virginia
- Died: July 19, 1881; Atlanta, Georgia
- Spouse: Mary Jeter (m. 1821)

Randolph Lawler Mott (1799-1881) was an American businessman and Union sympathizer of Columbus, Georgia.

== Early life ==
A native of Fauquier Co., Virginia, Mott was born on August 9, 1799. He was the son of William Mott and Sally Lawler. Mott apprenticed as a tailor and pursued that occupation when he left Virginia for Georgia in 1819. He settled first in Augusta before relocating to Milledgeville. Mott married Mary Jeter in 1821 in Milledgeville and entered a business partnership with John Mustain. Mustain married Mott's sister-in-law Julia Jeter in Macon in 1833.

== Career ==
Mott and Mustain operated a variety of business ventures including the Washington Hall hotel and a stagecoach line between Augusta and Montgomery via Macon. The partners moved to Columbus Georgia in 1843 and expanded into railroads, mills and real estate. Mustain was elected to the Georgia Legislature two years later and Mott took over the operations of their business. Mott was elected to the Georgia State Legislature himself in 1857. Mott also had a plantation in Russell County, Alabama.

=== Wanderer affair ===
Mott was indicted in 1859 for “holding an African negro boy” in the Wanderer Affair. He had acquired one of the last African slaves imported into the United States from Charles Augustus Lafayette Lamar who brought him from Africa aboard his ship Wanderer. That slave was later identified as Frank Bambush.

== After the civil war ==
After the Union Army captured the city in the Battle of Columbus on April 16, 1865, Union General James Harrison Wilson commandeered the Mott house for his headquarters. Mott was a slave owner but claimed that his property had never left the union. He said that he flew the American flag inside the home throughout the war.

Despite his age, Mott remained active in both civic and business affairs after the war. He was a trustee of both the Milledgeville insane asylum and the Columbus Freedman's Bureau as well as mayor pro tem of that city.

== Death ==
Mott died on July 19, 1881, at a railroad station in Atlanta. Graphic details of his death appeared in papers around Georgia after he fell under the wheels of a train while trying to get home from Atlanta.
