= Port Columbus =

Port Columbus may mean:

- The National Civil War Naval Museum at Port Columbus, an attraction in Columbus, Georgia
- Port Columbus (Georgia) on the Chattahoochee River in Columbus, Georgia
- Port Columbus International Airport, the former name for John Glenn Columbus International Airport in Columbus, Ohio
