= Emory Upton =

Union Army general (1839–1881)

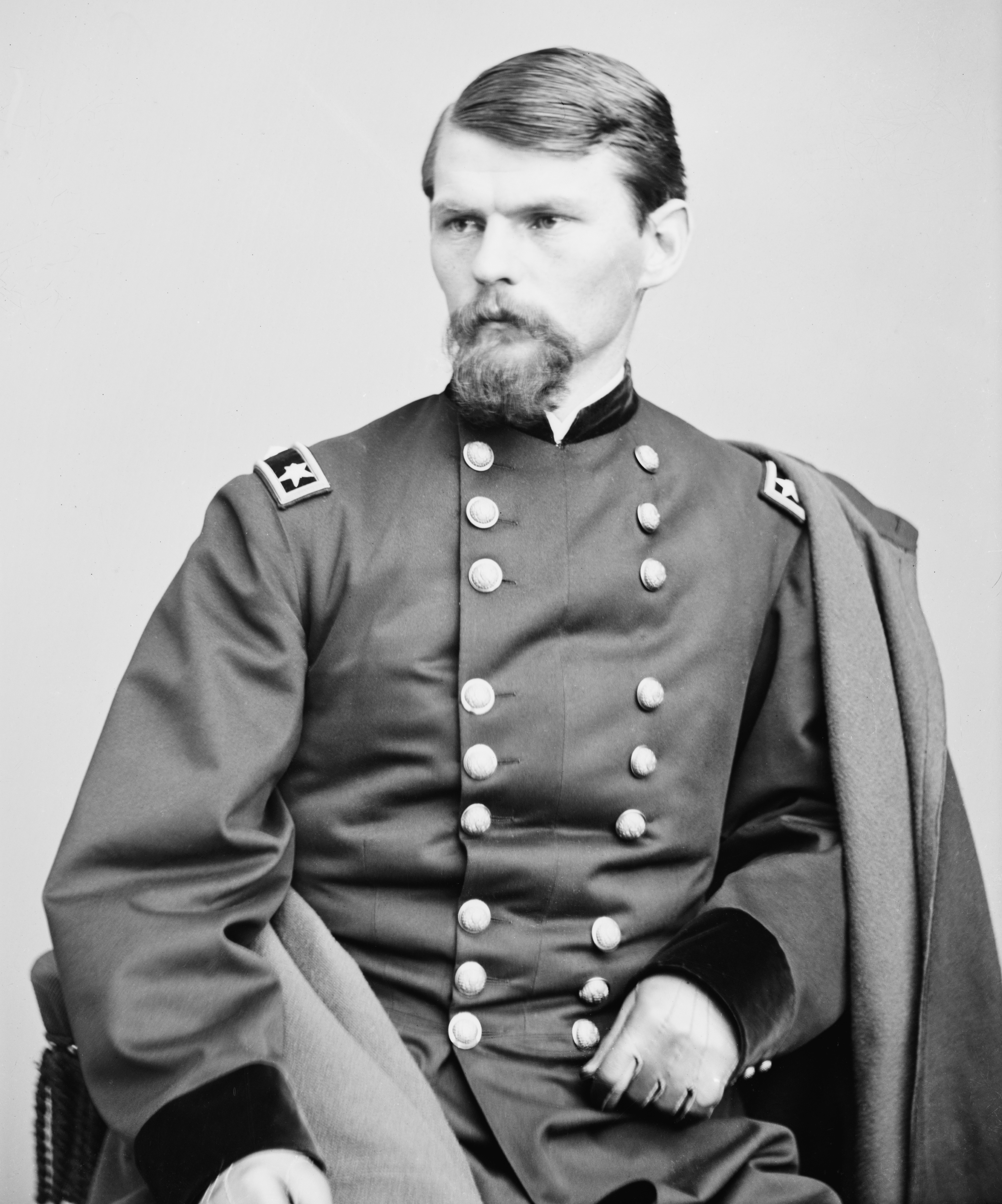
- Major General Emory Upton, c. 1865
- Born: August 27, 1839 near Batavia, New York, US
- Died: March 15, 1881 (aged 41); San Francisco, California, US
- Burial place: Fort Hill Cemetery
- Military career
- Allegiance: United States; Union
- Branch: United States Army; Union Army
- Service years: 1861–1881
- Rank: Brigadier General; Brevet Major General
- Commands: 121st New York Infantry; 4th U.S. Artillery
- Conflicts: American Civil War; Manassas campaign; First Battle of Bull Run; Peninsula Campaign; Seven Days Battles; Maryland Campaign; Battle of South Mountain; Battle of Antietam; Fredericksburg campaign; Battle of Fredericksburg; Chancellorsville campaign; Battle of Chancellorsville; Gettysburg campaign; Battle of Gettysburg; Overland Campaign; Battle of the Wilderness; Battle of Spotsylvania Court House; Battle of Cold Harbor; Siege of Petersburg; Sheridan's Shenandoah Valley campaign; Third Battle of Winchester; Wilson's Raid in Alabama and Georgia

Emory Upton (August 27, 1839 – March 15, 1881) was a United States Army general and military strategist, prominent for his role in leading infantry to attack entrenched positions successfully at the Battle of Spotsylvania Court House during the American Civil War, but he also excelled at artillery and cavalry assignments. His work, The Military Policy of the United States, which analyzed American military policies and practices and presented the first systematic examination of the nation's military history, had a tremendous effect on the U.S. Army when it was published posthumously in 1904.

== Early life ==
Upton was born on a farm near Batavia, New York, the tenth child and sixth son of Daniel and Electra Randall Upton. He would become the brother-in-law of Andrew J. Alexander and of Frank P. Blair Jr. He studied under famous evangelist Charles G. Finney at Oberlin College for two years before being admitted to the United States Military Academy at West Point in 1856. While at West Point, Upton lost a duel against fellow Cadet Wade Hampton Gibbes of South Carolina. Gibbes made remarks to other cadets about Upton's relationships with African-American girls at Oberlin College which prompted Upton to challenge Gibbes to a duel. The two men fought with swords in a darkened room of the cadet barracks. Upton suffered a deep cut on his face. He graduated eighth in his class of 45 cadets on May 6, 1861, just in time for the outbreak of the Civil War.

In 1868, Upton married Emily Norwood Martin, daughter of the philanthropist and social activist Cornelia Williams Martin, and she died of tuberculosis in 1870.

== Civil War ==
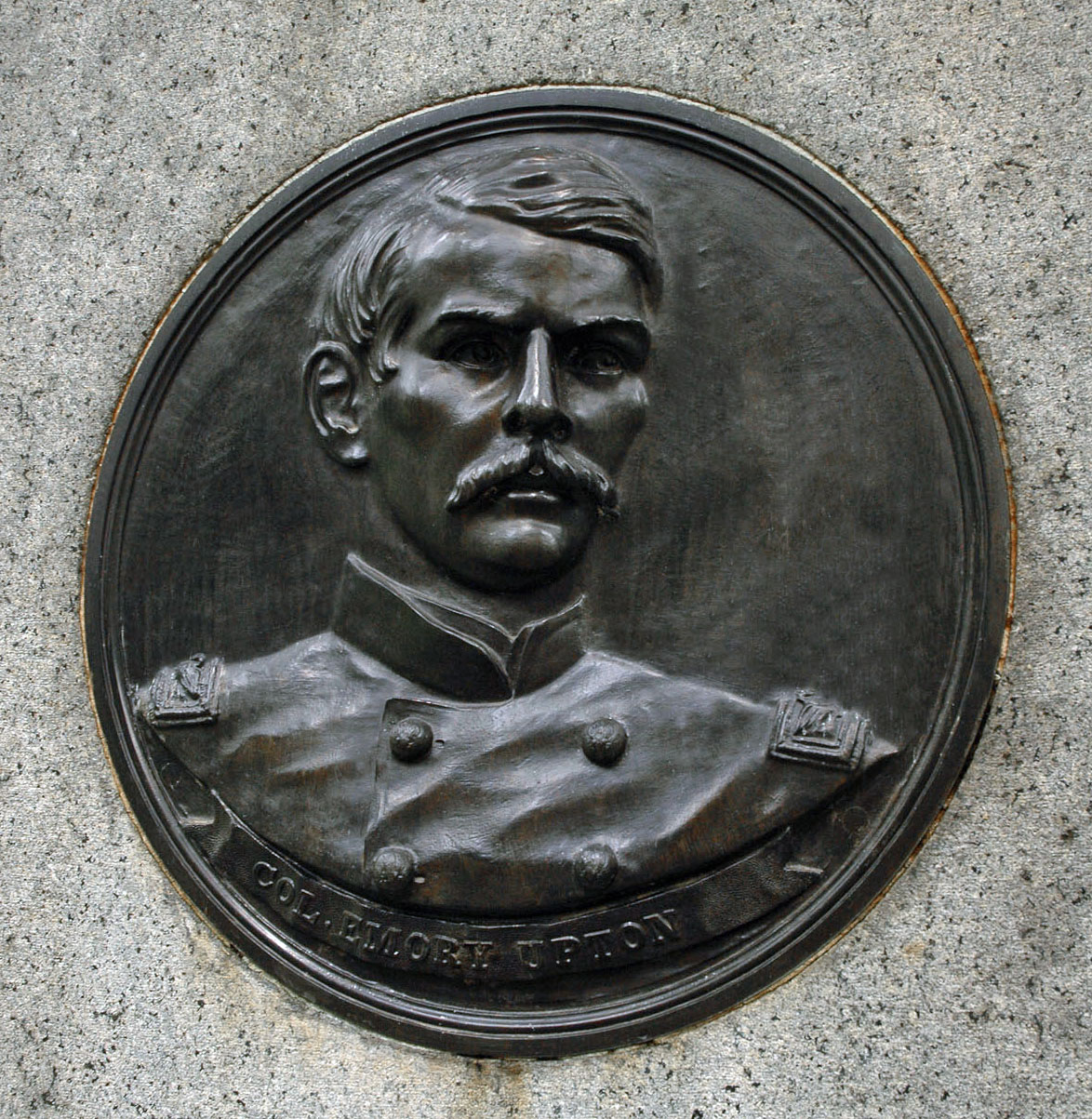
Emory Upton depicted on the 121st New York Infantry Regiment monument at Gettysburg National Military Park

Upton was commissioned a second lieutenant in the 4th U.S. Artillery, transferring to the 5th U.S. Artillery as a first lieutenant on May 14, assigned to Brig. Gen. Irvin McDowell's Army of Northeastern Virginia, as an aide-de-camp to Brig. Gen. Daniel Tyler. In the First Battle of Bull Run, July 21, 1861, he was wounded in the arm and left side during the action at Blackburn's Ford, although he did not leave the field. He commanded his battery in the VI Corps Artillery Reserve through the 1862 Peninsula Campaign and the Seven Days Battles. In the Maryland Campaign, including the battles at Crampton's Gap at South Mountain and the Battle of Antietam, he commanded the artillery brigade for the 1st Division, VI Corps.

Upton was appointed colonel of the 121st New York on October 23, 1862. He led the regiment at the Battle of Fredericksburg in December and commanded the 2nd Brigade, 1st Division, of the VI Corps, starting at the Battle of Gettysburg, to where the corps marched 35 miles in a single night from Manchester, Maryland, and was then kept in reserve. In the Bristoe Campaign, Upton was cited for gallant service at Rappahannock Station in November 1863 and was given a brevet promotion to major in the regular army.

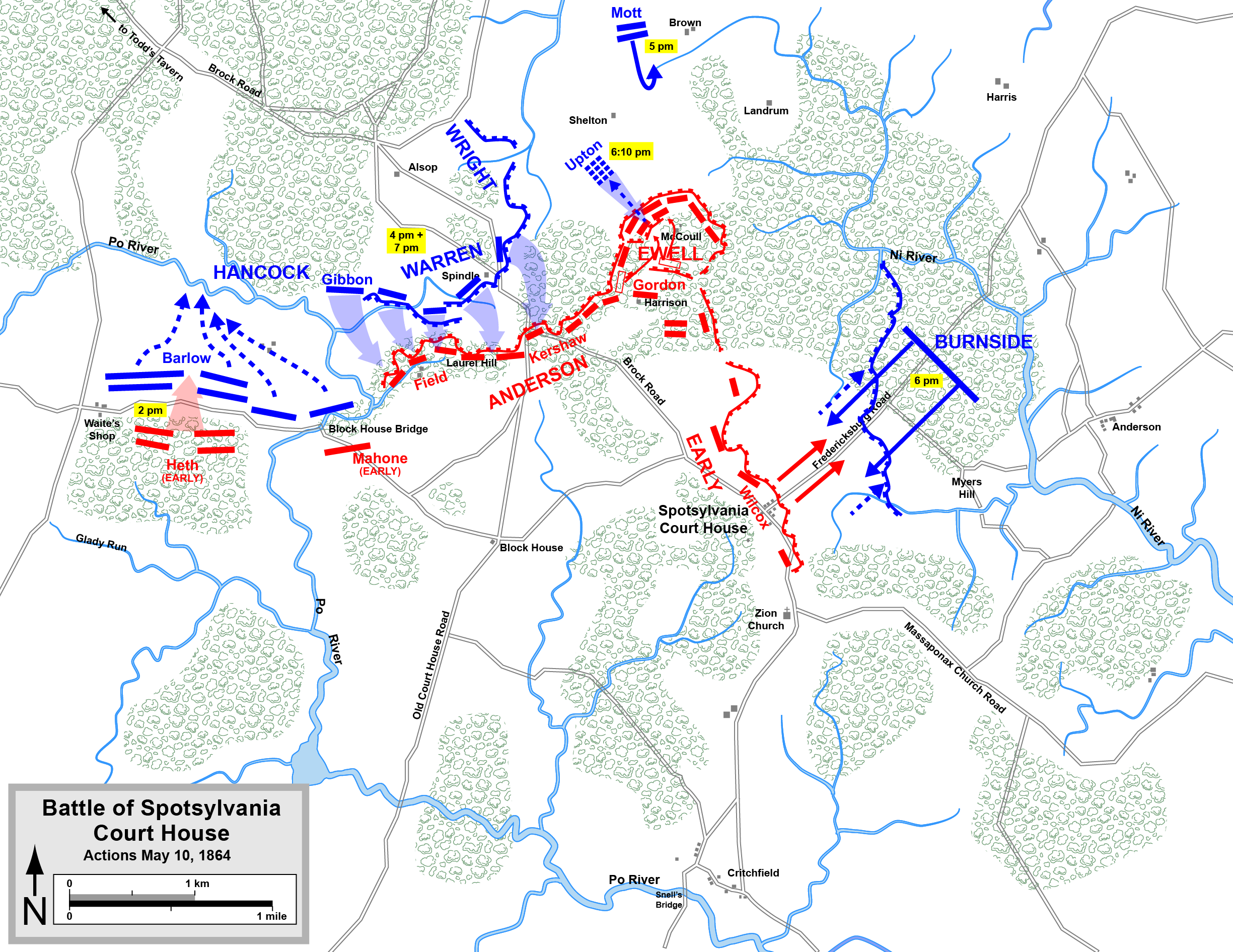
Actions at Spotsylvania Court House, May 10, 1864 Confederate Union

In the 1864 Overland Campaign, Upton led his brigade in the Wilderness, but his greatest contribution was at Spotsylvania Court House, where he developed a new tactic to attack the Confederate breastworks, one that would foreshadow tactics used in the trench warfare of World War I. Upton devised a tactic wherein columns of massed infantry would swiftly assault a small part of the enemy line, without pausing to trade fire, and in doing so attempt to overwhelm the defenders and achieve a breakthrough. The standard infantry assault employed a wide battle line advancing more slowly, firing at the enemy as it moved forward. On May 10, 1864, Upton led twelve regiments in such an assault against the Confederate's Mule Shoe salient. His tactics worked and his command penetrated to the center of the Mule Shoe, but they were left unsupported and forced to withdraw in the face of enemy artillery and mounting reinforcements. Upton was wounded but not severely in the attack, but was promoted to brigadier general to rank from May 12. On that same day, Maj. Gen. Winfield S. Hancock adapted Upton's columnar assault tactic to the entire II Corps to break through the Mule Shoe. On June 1 Upton's 2nd Brigade was engaged in the Battle of Cold Harbor where his units suffered some heavy losses. In late June 1864 he participated in the early stages of the Siege of Petersburg.

The VI Corps, of which Upton's brigade was part, was detached from the Army of the Potomac and sent to deal with Confederate Lt. Gen. Jubal A. Early's threat to Washington and in the subsequent Valley Campaigns of 1864. At the Third Battle of Winchester, Upton assumed command of the 1st Division, VI Corps, when its commander fell mortally wounded. Upton himself was severely wounded in the thigh soon after, but refused to be removed from the field until the battle was over. He was carried on a stretcher for the duration of the battle, directing his troops. He received two brevet promotions for Winchester: colonel in the regular army (September 19, 1864) and major general of volunteers (October 19).

After returning from medical leave, Upton finished the war as a cavalry commander, completing his mastery of all three combat arms. Under the command of Maj. Gen. James H. Wilson, he led the 4th Division of the Cavalry Corps of the Military Division of the Mississippi. The division saw action during Wilson's Raid and the Battle of Selma.

On April 16, 1865, the division made a night assault upon the Confederate works in the Battle of Columbus, Georgia, capturing a large amount of arms, ammunition, stores, and 1,500 prisoners, and burning the incomplete casemate ironclad, CSS Muscogee. This occurred a week after the surrender of Robert E. Lee's army in Virginia, and was the last large-scale engagement during the war. A few weeks later, in May 1865, Upton was ordered to arrest Alexander Stephens, the vice president of the Confederacy, and a little later Jefferson Davis was placed in his custody. He was given a brevet promotion to brigadier general in the regular army for his actions at Selma and major general in the regular army, both on March 13, 1865.

Robert Hoffsommer wrote that, by the end of the war, the 25-year-old Upton "had commanded outstandingly in all three branches of the army."

== Postbellum career and death ==
After the war, Upton commanded a cavalry brigade in the Department of the Cumberland from July through September 1865 and served in the District of Colorado until April 1866. He was mustered out of the volunteer service on April 30, 1866. He was assigned to a board at West Point that considered a new system of infantry tactics, which was approved in 1867. In July 1866 he was appointed lieutenant colonel of the 25th U.S. Infantry and transferred to the 18th U.S. Infantry in March 1869. From 1870 to 1875 he was the commandant of cadets at the United States Military Academy, where he also taught infantry, artillery, and cavalry tactics. Upton was a member of the Society of the Army of the Potomac.

Impressed with the lessons of the Franco-Prussian War, U.S. Army Commanding General William T. Sherman sent Upton on a tour of Europe and Asia to study military organizations, but with a special emphasis on the German Army. Upon his return, Upton wrote The Armies of Europe and Asia, which warned that European armies had developed soldiering as a profession to a more advanced state than the U.S. Army. Upton presented 54 pages of recommendations for changes in the Army, including that it establish advanced military schools, a general staff, a system of personnel evaluation reports, and promotion by examination. The U.S. interest in French military organizations and tactics, which dominated fighting in the Civil War, went into decline. He was appointed superintendent of theoretical instruction at the Artillery School of Practice located at Fort Monroe, Virginia, where he emphasized combined arms tactics. His duties included teaching "military art and science" - geography, military history and law - introduced in 1875 by George W. Getty.

In 1881, Upton, having returned to the rank of colonel in 1880, was in command of 4th U.S. Artillery at the Presidio of San Francisco. He suffered greatly from headaches, possibly caused by a brain tumor, and died by suicide on March 15, 1881, by shooting himself in the head. He is buried in Fort Hill Cemetery, Auburn, New York.

== Army reform ==
Upton is considered one of the most influential young reformers of the United States Army in the 19th century, and arguably in U.S. history. He has been called the U.S. Army's counterpart to United States Navy reformer and strategist Alfred Thayer Mahan. Although his books on tactics and on Asian and European armies were considered influential, his greatest impact was a work he called The Military Policy of the United States from 1775. He worked for years on the paper, and it was still incomplete at the time of his death in 1881.

Military Policy was a controversial work in which Upton outlined U.S. military history, arguing that the country’s armed forces were imprudent and weak and "that all the defects of the American military system rested upon a fundamental, underlying flaw, excessive civilian control of the military." He denigrated the influence of the Secretary of War and promoted the idea that all military decisions in the field should be made by professional officers, although the president should retain the role of commander-in-chief. He argued for a strong, standing regular army that would be supplemented by volunteers or conscripts in time of war, a general staff system based on the Prussian model, examinations to determine promotions, compulsory retirement of officers who reach a certain age, advanced military education, and combat maneuvering by groups of four three-battalion infantry regiments. Upton's work had a profound influence on discussions of military and civilian strategy for years. All of Upton's proposed reforms would be implemented in the 1890s and early 1900s and laid the foundation for the high level of efficiency the U.S. Army demonstrated in World War I.

After Upton's death, Henry A. du Pont, Upton's West Point classmate and a close friend, acquired a copy of the uncompleted manuscript. It circulated widely throughout the Army's officer corps and helped to foment much discussion. After the Spanish–American War, Secretary of War Elihu Root read the manuscript and ordered that the War Department publish it under the title The Military Policy of the United States. Many of the Army's so-called Root Reforms of the early twentieth century were inspired by Upton and his works.

== Memorials ==
In 1895, Maj. Gen. James H. Wilson wrote an introductory article for a book by (Peter Michie), The Life and Letters of Emory Upton. Wilson's tribute to his former subordinate demonstrates the significance of Emory Upton's accomplishments and characteristics:

... Upton was as good an artillery officer as could be found in any country, the equal of any cavalry commander of his day, and, all things considered, was the best commander of a division of infantry in either the Union or the rebel army. ... He was incontestably the best tactician of either army, and this is true whether tested by battle or by the evolutions of the drill field and parade. In view of his success of all arms of the service, it is not too much to add that he could scarcely have failed as a corps or army commander had it been his good fortune to be called to such rank. ... No one can read the story of his brilliant career without concluding that he had a real genius for war, together with all the theoretical and practical knowledge which any one could acquire in regard to it. Up to the time when he was disabled by the disease which caused his death he was, all things considered, the most accomplished soldier in our service. His life was pure and upright, his bearing chivalric and commanding, his conduct modest and unassuming, and his character absolutely without blemish. History cannot furnish a brighter example of unselfish patriotism, or ambition unsullied by an ignoble thought or an unworthy deed. He was a credit to the State and family which gave him birth, to the military academy which educated him, and to the army in which he served. So long as the Union has such soldiers as he to defend it, it will be perpetual.

— Maj. Gen. James H. Wilson, The Life and Letters of Emory Upton

Upton was commemorated at a site in central Suffolk County, New York, presently occupied by Brookhaven National Laboratory. The U.S. Army's Camp Upton was active from 1917 until 1920, and again from 1940 until 1946. During World War II, the camp was rebuilt primarily as an induction center for draftees. The Army later used the site as a convalescent and rehabilitation hospital for returning wounded.

A statue of Upton stands before the Genesee County Courthouse in his native Batavia.

Reflecting a pattern of naming many Washington, D.C., streets in newly developed areas in the capital after Civil War generals, an east-west street in the Northwest quadrant is named Upton Street, NW.

== Dates of rank ==
Insignia	Rank	Component	Date
No insignia	Cadet	USMA	1 July 1856
	Second Lieutenant	4th Artillery	6 May 1861
	First Lieutenant	5th Artillery	14 May 1861
	Colonel	121st New York Infantry	23 October 1862
	Brevet Major	Regular Army	8 November 1863
	Brevet Lieutenant Colonel	Regular Army	10 May 1864
	Brigadier General	Volunteers	12 May 1864
	Brevet Major General	Volunteers	19 October 1864
	Captain	5th Artillery	22 February 1865
	Brevet Major General	Regular Army	13 March 1865
	Lieutenant Colonel	25th Infantry	28 July 1866
	Colonel	4th Artillery, Regular Army	1 July 1880

== Selected works ==
- A New System of Infantry Tactics, Double and Single Rank, Adapted to American Topography and Improved Fire-Arms (published in 1867)
- Tactics for Non-Military Bodies (1870)
- The Armies of Asia and Europe. Embracing Official Reports On the Armies of Japan, China, India, Persia, Italy, Russia, Austria, Germany, France, and England. Accompanied by Letters Descriptive of A Journey from Japan to the Caucasus. New York: D. Appleton & Co. (1878)
- Infantry Tactics in Use at the N.Y.S. Reformatory (posthumous, 1889)
- The Military Policy of the United States (posthumous, 1904)

== See also ==
- List of American Civil War generals (Union)
