= Battle of Columbus =

The Battle of Columbus may refer to:

- The Battle of Columbus (1865), the last major land battle in the Eastern Theater of the American Civil War, April 16, 1865
- The Battle of Columbus (1916), a conflict between Pancho Villa and the U.S. Cavalry occurring in the Southwest U.S.
