= Mott House (Columbus, Georgia) =

Historic house in Georgia, United States

- U.S. National Register of Historic Places
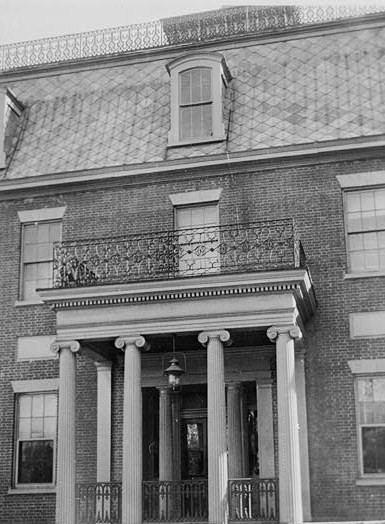
- Mott House from a Historic American Buildings Survey photograph from 1936
- Location: Front Ave., Columbus, Georgia
- Coordinates: 32°28′22″N 84°59′39″W
- Built: 1839
- NRHP reference No.: 74000698
- Added to NRHP: December 3, 1974

The Mott House was a historic residence constructed in 1839 in Columbus, Georgia. The building was listed on the National Register of Historic Places in 1974. It was destroyed by fire in 2014.

== History ==
The Mott House was constructed in 1839. It was first home to local businessmen James Calhoun and Daniel Griffin, then purchased by Randolph Lawler Mott in 1856. Mott, the house's namesake and prominent Union sympathizer, would later oversee its placement in the history books during the American Civil War. After the Battle of Columbus, the final battle of the Civil War, the Mott House served as the headquarters of the Union General James H. Wilson.

=== Final years ===
Following the construction of the TSYS campus in 1999, the Mott House was deemed to remain in its original location, between the newly constructed main TSYS office building and its parking garage (designed to look like the cotton mill that once stood in the same location) along the banks of the Chattahoochee River. In 2013, a renovation of the Mott House began, consisting of many added facilities. During the early morning of September 7, 2014, the Mott House caught fire; it was later determined to be a total loss.

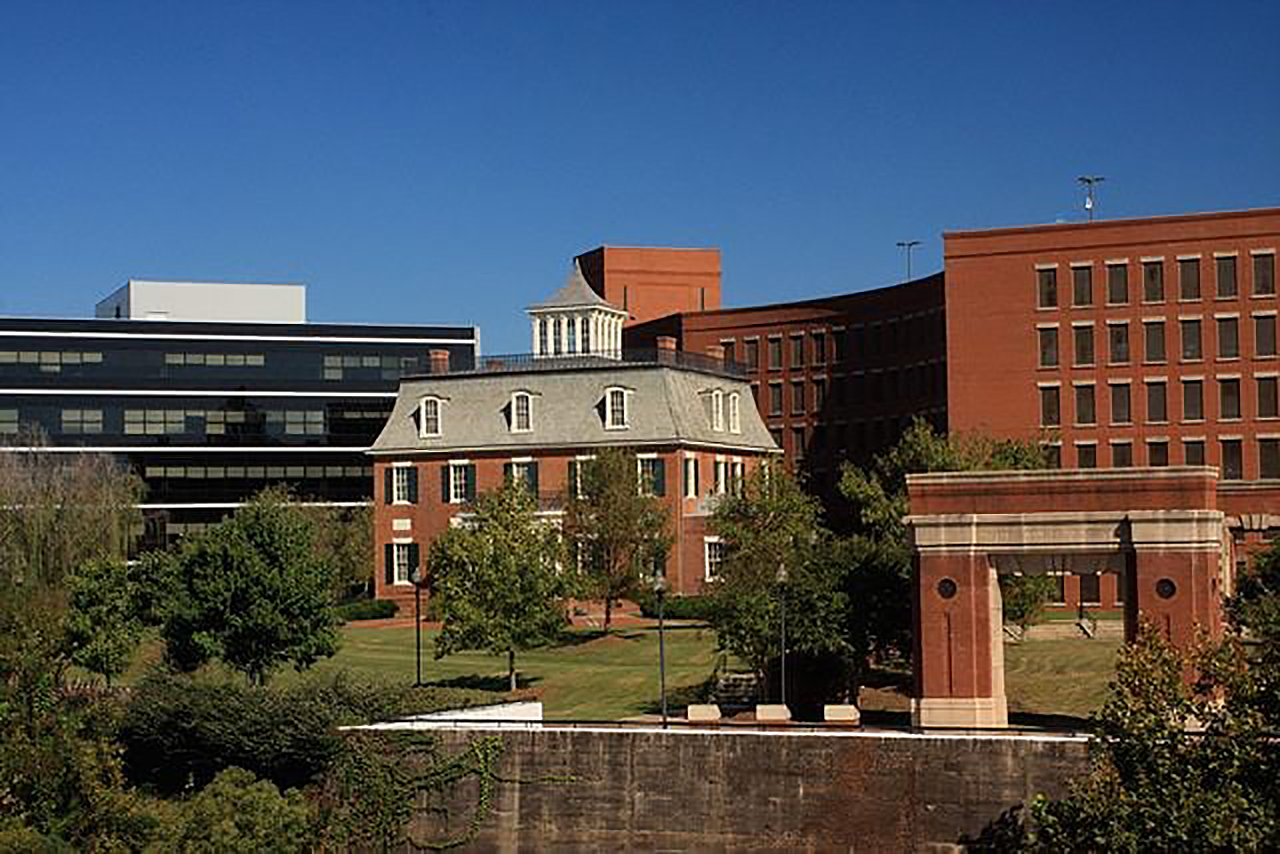
The Mott House after a fresh remodel in 2014; before the fire

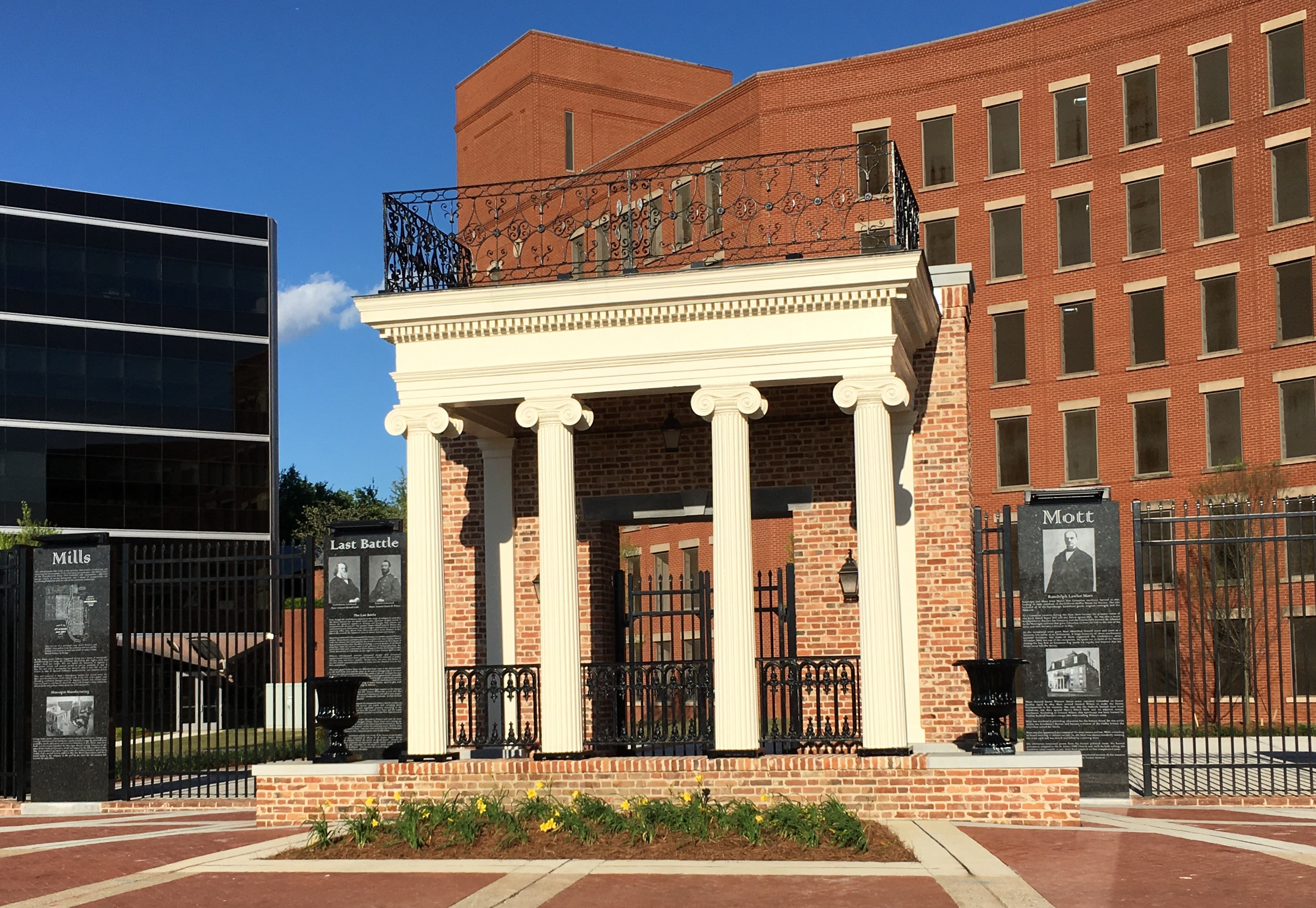
Mott House memorial facade, constructed in 2016

In 2016, a memorial opened at the site of the Mott House, showcasing a replica of its Antebellum facade, along with many plaques describing its history.
