= Edward Sandford Martin =

American journalist

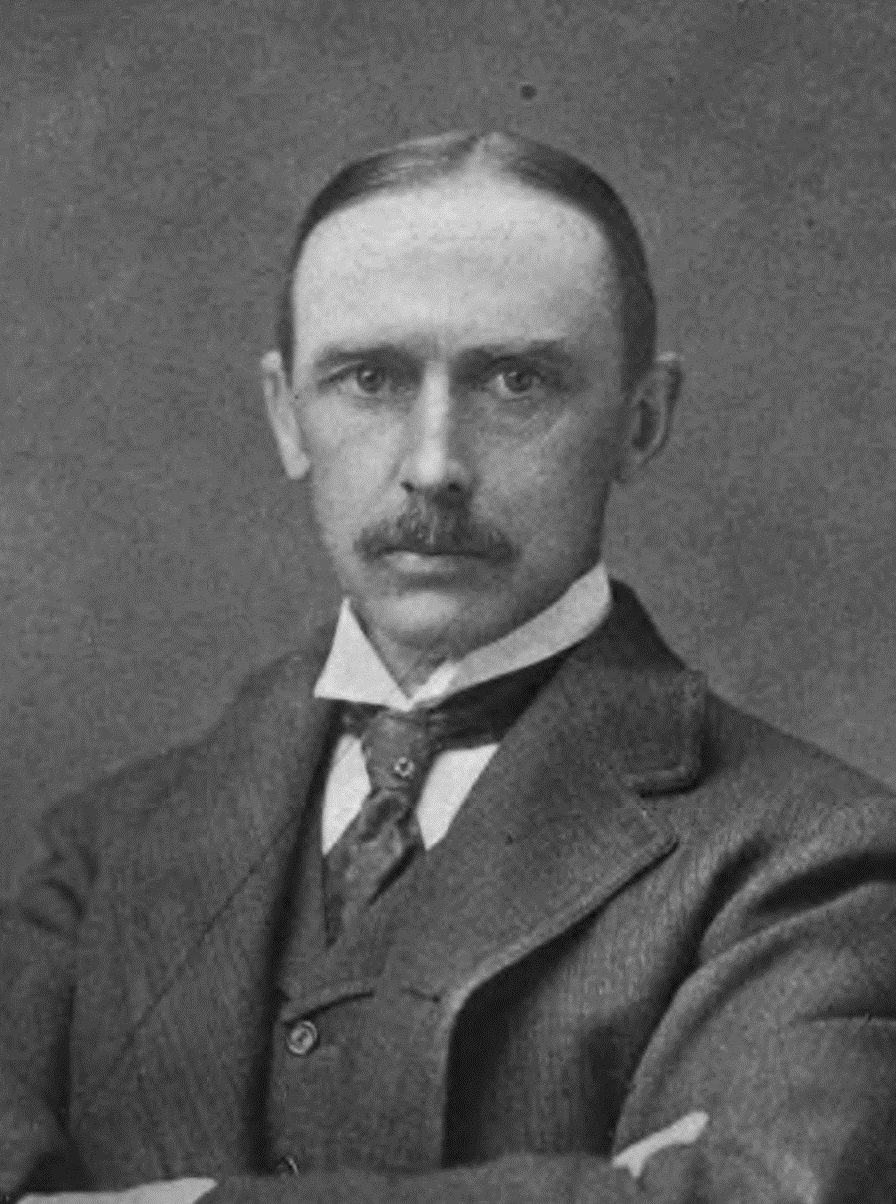
Portrait of Edward Sanford Martin

Edward Sandford Martin (2 January 1856 – 13 June 1939) was an American journalist and editor.

== Biography ==
Edward S. Martin was born in 1856 on his grand-uncle Enos T. Throop's estate "Willowbrook" near Auburn, New York. His mother, Cornelia Williams Martin, was a prominent social activist in Auburn. The youngest son in his parents' large and socially prominent family, Edward S. Martin completed his secondary education in 1872 at Phillips Academy and in 1877 graduated with a bachelor's degree from Harvard University, where in 1876 he was one of the founders of the Harvard Lampoon.

In 1883 he became the first literary editor of Life Magazine (a satire magazine that preceded the pictorial magazine of the same name); from 1887 to 1933 he was the chief editorial writer. From 1920 to 1935 he wrote the column "Easy Chair" for Harper's Magazine.

In 1884 he was admitted to the bar at Rochester, New York. From 1885 to 1893 he was Assistant Editor for the Rochester Union and Advertiser. In 1896 he moved with his family to New York City. In 1886, he married and in 1907 three children from the marriage were alive.

Martin's sister Emily Norwood Martin Upton (1846–1870) married military strategist General Emory Upton (1839–1881) in 1868, but died of consumption two years later.

== Selected publications ==
- History of the Hoosac Tunnel. 1877.
- Sly ballades in Harvard China. A. Williams and company. 1882.
- A little brother of the rich, and other poems. 1888.
- Windfalls of observation: gathered for the edification of the young and the solace of others. 1893. 8th edition. C. Scribner's Sons. 1898.
- Cousin Anthony and I: some views of ours about divers matters and various aspects of life. C. Scribner's sons. 1895.
- Lucid intervals. Harper & brothers. 1900.
- Poems & verses by Edward Sandford Martin. Harper and Brothers. 1902.
- Luxury of children & some other luxuries. Harper & brothers. 1904; illustrated by Sarah S. Stilwell
- Courtship of a careful man, and a few other courtships. Harper & Brothers. 1905.
- In a new century. C. Scribner's Sons. 1908.
- Reflections of a beginning husband. Harper & Brothers. 1913.
- The unrest of women by Edward Sandford Martin. D. Appleton. 1913.
- Diary of a nation; the war and how we got into it. 1917.
- Abroad with Jane. Priv. print. U. B. Updike. 1918.
- Life of Joseph Hodges Choate as gathered chiefly from his letters, by Edward Sandford Martin, including his own story of his boyhood and youth ... C. Scribner's Sons. 1920.
- What's ahead & meanwhile. 1927.
- Some account of family stocks involved in life at Willowbrook and of neighbors and visitors, especially in the latter part of the nineteenth century. 1933.
- as editor: The wayfarer in New York. The Macmillan Company. 1909.
