= Samuel Wells Williams =

American sinologist

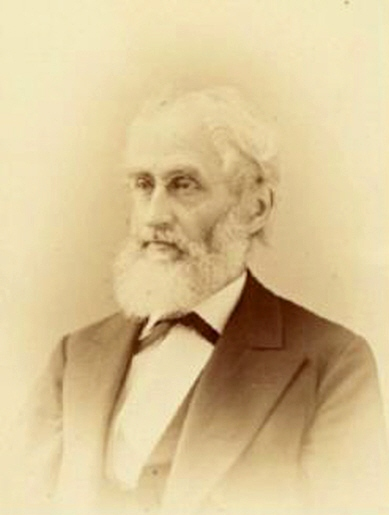
- S. Wells Williams
- Born: September 22, 1812; Utica, New York, U.S.
- Died: February 16, 1884 (aged 71); New Haven, Connecticut, U.S.
- Education: Rensselaer Polytechnic Institute
- Occupation(s): Linguist, missionary and sinologist
- Years active: 1832-1884
- Relatives: Cornelia Williams Martin (cousin)

Chinese name
- Chinese: 衛三畏
Transcriptions
Standard Mandarin
- Hanyu Pinyin: Wèi Sānwèi
Yue: Cantonese
- Jyutping: Wai6 Saam1 Wai3

Samuel Wells Williams (September 22, 1812 – February 16, 1884) was a linguist, official, missionary and sinologist from the United States in the early 19th century.

== Early life ==
Williams was born in Utica, New York, son of William Williams (1787–1850) and the former Sophia Wells, an elder of the First Presbyterian Church. Among his siblings were brothers William Frederick Williams (who worked with Dr. H. A. DeForest in Beirut, Lebanon) and Henry Dwight Williams. His father's Williams family moved from Massachusetts to Utica in 1800 where his father joined his uncle, William McLean, and assisted in publishing the Whitestown Gazette (today the Observer-Dispatch) and Cato's Patrol (later renamed the Patriot after it was sold to John H. Lathrop in 1803). His became a partner in 1807, and later a master printer and journalist before serving in the War of 1812. Williams' cousin, Cornelia Williams Martin, was a prominent philanthropist and social activist in Auburn, New York, and helped support his missionary work in China.

At age 8 he was impressed by the departure to Ceylon as a printing missionary of a James Garrett who was associated with his father's printing business. He studied at Rensselaer Polytechnic Institute in Troy, New York. There he assisted in the writing of a botanical manual by Senior Professor and co-founder Amos Eaton, published 1833. On graduation he was elected as a professor of the institute.

== China ==
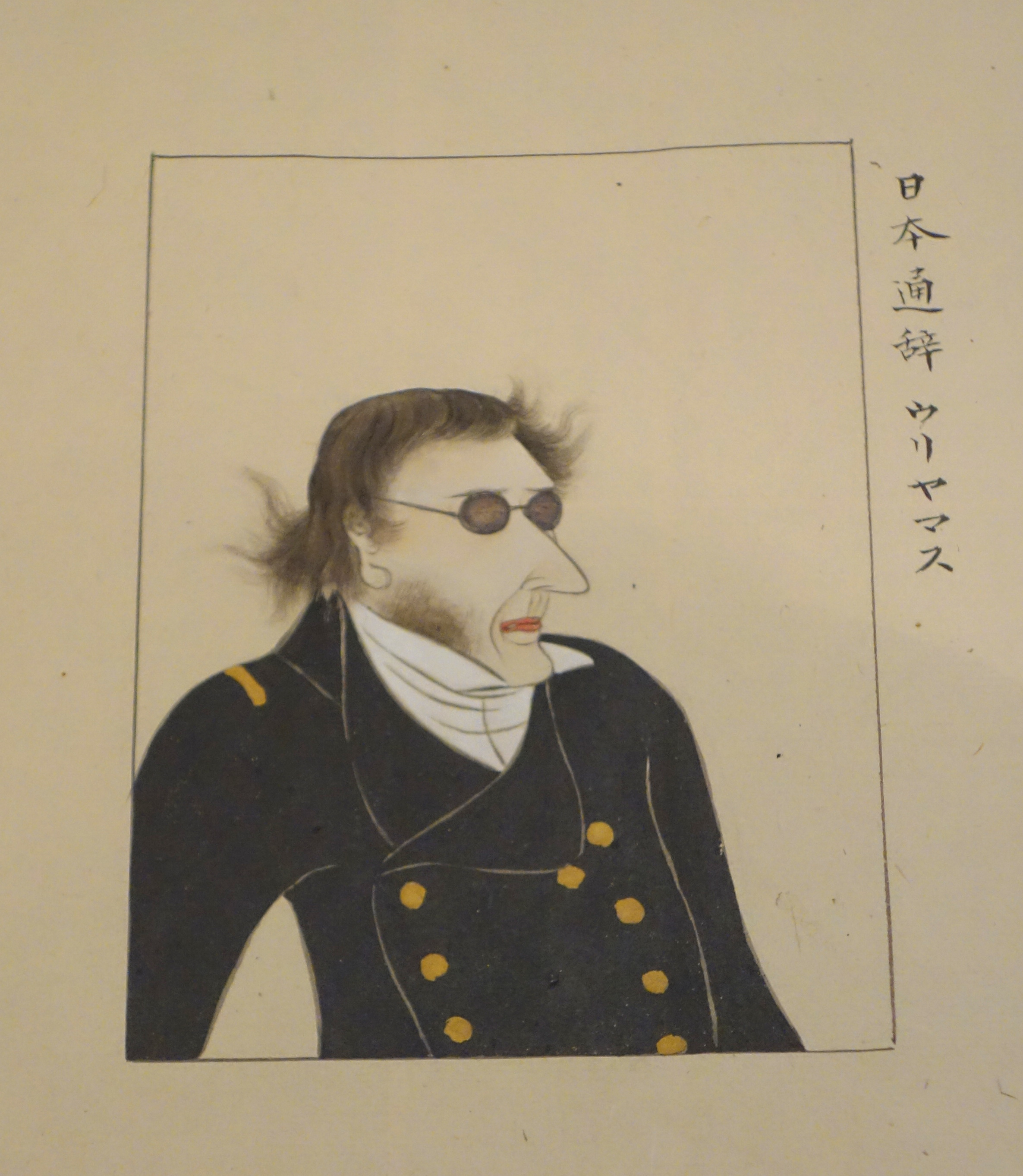
Williams as depicted by the Japanese artist Hibata Osuke's 1854 sketches

After a year's preparation, on June 15, 1833, just 21, he sailed for China to take charge of the printing press of the American Board of Commissioners for Foreign Missions at Guangdong, China. He arrived at Whampoa, Canton, aboard the Morrison on October 25, 1833. With the death of the pioneering missionary Robert Morrison the next year, he and Elijah Bridgman, who had arrived only three years ahead of Williams, were the only missionaries in the whole of China. He assisted Bridgman in the latter's Chinese Chrestomathy in the Canton Dialect, published in 1842, and Walter Medhurst in completing his English-Chinese Dictionary of 1848, two early works of Chinese lexicography.

In 1837 he sailed on the Morrison to Japan. Officially this trip was to return some stranded Japanese sailors, but it was also an unsuccessful attempt to open Japan to American trade.

From 1848 to 1851 Williams was the editor of The Chinese Repository, a leading Western journal published in China. In 1853, he was attached to Commodore Matthew Calbraith Perry's expedition to Japan as an official interpreter.

In 1855, Williams was appointed Secretary of the United States Legation to China. During his stay in China, he wrote A Tonic Dictionary Of The Chinese Language In The Canton Dialect (英華分韻撮要) in 1856. After years of opposition from the Chinese government, Williams was instrumental in the negotiation of the Treaty of Tientsin, which provided for the toleration of both Chinese and foreign Christians.

In 1860, he was appointed chargé d'affaires for the United States in Beijing. He resigned his position on October 25, 1876, 43 years to the day that he first landed at Guangzhou in 1833. Around 1875, he completed a translation of the Book of Genesis and the Gospel of Matthew into Japanese, but the manuscripts were lost in a fire before they could be published.

=== Later life ===
Williams returned to the United States in 1877 where he spent the last eight years of his life. Williams became the first Professor of Chinese language and literature in the United States at Yale University as well as the president of the American Bible Society on February 3, 1881. "He also revised his book, The Middle Kingdom. In his later years, he heavily corresponded with missionaries remaining in China, the American Bible Society and with Scribners concerning the publishing of The Middle Kingdom."

== Personal life ==
On November 20, 1845, Williams married Sarah Simonds Walworth (1815–1881), a daughter of Maj. John Walworth. Together, they were the parents of several children, including:

- Sophia Gardner Williams (1855–1938), who married Thomas George Grosvenor, C.B., second son of Robert Grosvenor, 1st Baron Ebury, in 1877. Grosvenor was appointed secretary to the British legation at Peking in 1879 and died in 1886. Sophia married secondly to Sir Albert Gray, Counsel of the Chairman of Committees at the House of Lords from 1896 to 1922.
- Frederick Wells Williams (1857–1928), editor of The National Baptist, a professor at Yale; he married Frances "Fanny" Hapgood Wayland (1864–1948), a granddaughter of Francis Wayland, President of Brown University.

He died at his residence, 39 College Street in New Haven, Connecticut, on February 16, 1884.

== Works ==
- Elijah Coleman Bridgman, Samuel Wells Williams, ed. (1832–51). The Chinese Repository. Canton: Printed for the proprietors.
- "Narrative of a Voyage of the ship Morrison, Captain David Ingersoll, to Lewchew and Japan, in July and August, 1837". The Calcutta Christian Observer. 7: 37. 1838.
- Samuel Wells Williams (1842). Easy lessons in Chinese: or progressive exercises to facilitate the study of that language. MACAO: Chinese Repository.
- Samuel Wells Williams (1844). English & Chinese vocabulary in the court dialect. Macao: Office of the Chinese Repository. p. 440.
- Williams, Samuel Wells (1848). The Middle Kingdom: a survey of the geography, government, education, social life, arts, religion, etc. of the Chinese Empire and its inhabitants. New York: Wiley and Putnam.
- Account of a Japanese romance (1849) Retrieved 1 August 2017.
- S Wells Williams (1856). Ying Wá Fan Wan Tsüt Iú: A Tonic Dictionary of the Chinese Language in the Canton Dialect. Canton: The Chinese Repository. p. 792.
- The Chinese commercial guide (1856)
- Samuel Wells Williams (1874). A syllabic dictionary of the Chinese language: arranged according to the Wu-fang Yuen Yin, with the pronunciation of the characters as heard in Peking, Canton, Amoy, and Shanghai. Shanghai: American Presbyterian Mission Press. p. 1254.
- Chinese Immigration (1879)
- Samuel Wells Williams (1910). F W Williams (ed.). A journal of the Perry expedition to Japan (1853-1854). Archived from the original on April 27, 2016.

== Publications ==
- Reports of missionary society hospitals at Amoy, Canton, Chinkiang, Foochow, Hankow, Shanghai, Swatow, Tientsin. 1848-49 (1850)
