= National Civil War Naval Museum =

Civil war museum in Columbus, Georgia

Port Columbus
- National Civil War Naval Museum

- 32.447723 N,-84.979513 W
- Established: 1962
- Location: 1002 Victory Drive; Columbus, Georgia; United States
- Coordinates: 32.447723°N 84.979513°W
- Type: American Civil War Naval
- Director: Holly Wait
- Website: http://www.portcolumbus.org

The National Civil War Naval Museum, located in Columbus, Georgia, United States, is a 40,000-square-foot (3,700 m^{2}) facility that features remnants of two Confederate States Navy vessels. It also features uniforms, equipment and weapons used by the United States (Union) Navy from the North and the Confederate States Navy (Southern /Rebel) forces. It is claimed to be the only museum in the nation that tells the story of the two navies during the Civil War.

== Origin ==
The museum opened in 1962 at 202 4th Street in Columbus as the "James W. Woodruff, Jr., Confederate Naval Museum", named after the man whose financial support made the museum a reality.

It was known as the Confederate Naval Museum in 1970 when the two ships were listed on the National Register of Historic Places as C.S.S. Muscogee and Chattahoochee (gunboats). The Georgia Historical Association authors of the National Register nomination noted that Biggers, Scarbrough and Neal, the Columbus architects who designed the museum, had created "an imaginative and quite contemporary canopy for the salvaged gunboats."

In March 2001, the museum relocated to its present eight million dollar facility at 1002 Victory Drive and received a new name to reflect new exhibits that showcase both the Union and Confederate navies.

== Exhibits ==
The highlight of the museum is the 180-foot (55 m) hull of C.S.S. Jackson (also known as C.S.S.Muscogee), a revolutionary developed ironclad warship ram put to fire in the Chattahoochee River by the Union Army troops of Gen. James H. Wilson and recovered from the muddy bed of the river in the 1960s. Also on display are what's left of C.S.S. Chattahoochee and an intact rowboat from U.S.S. Hartford, famed flagship of Federal Admiral David Farragut at the naval Battle of Mobile Bay in 1864. Two models of the warships U.S.S. Monitor and C.S.S Virginia (the former U.S.S. Merrimack steam frigate under construction at Gosport Navy Yard near Norfolk, Virginia, captured after scuttling April 1861 with the naval facilities), used in the TNT cable TV channel's 1991 film Ironclads, and recreated full-scale sections of three other American Civil War-era warships are among the hundreds of Civil War artifacts located in the museum (including sections of U.S. Navy Admiral David Farragut's U.S.S. Hartford including the berth deck, wardroom and captain's cabin). There is also a battle experience theater that will put visitors right in the middle of a Civil War battle and an interactive Confederate ironclad ship simulator offering visitors an opportunity to experience 19th-century naval combat at first hand.

A large Civil War naval flag exhibit is the newest addition to the museum. According to executive director Bruce Smith, it is the largest display of navy-related flags from the Civil War era anywhere in the nation. Fourteen flags representing ships and forts from the entire scope of the Civil War are seen in this new exhibit, which is entitled "Ramparts to Topmast: Flags of Triumph and Despair".

Thanks to a family from Ohio, visitors can see a particular flag that was in hiding for 137 years. On the night of July 22, 1862, the captain of the ironclad warship C.S.S. Arkansas believed his ship was safe in the harbor on the Mississippi River at Vicksburg, Mississippi. Then in the darkness, two Union Navy ships attacked it. U.S.S. Queen of the West attempted to ram Arkansas. As the two vessels lay side to side, a civilian engineer, John P. Skelton, aboard the Federal ship leaped aboard Arkansas and tore down its flag. He reboarded to his own ship and hid the flag in a barrel of beans. After his discharge, Skelton took the flag back to Ohio, where it remained until 1999 when his descendants sent the flag back home again. It now rests in a place of honor on the wall of the museum.

The museum also has the largest collection of surviving Brooke rifled naval cannons made in Confederate iron foundries at Selma, Alabama. These four cannons are two 7-inch rifles, one 10-inch smoothbore, and one 11-inch smoothbore. The 11-inch smoothbore is the largest surviving Brooke artillery pieces.

== U.S.S./C.S.S. Water Witch project ==
The museum constructed a full-scale reproduction of U.S.S./C.S.S. Water Witch in 2009 using her original plan drawings. At more than 160 feet (49 m) in length, the ship was a landmark in the Columbus area. The masts were nearly 90 feet (27 m) tall. The replica was built using untreated lumber, and deteriorated over the years. It was determined to be unsalvageable and demolished in October 2019.

The original Water Witch was stationed as a Union Navy blockader outside Savannah, Georgia during the war. She was captured during a Confederate States Navy commando raid – led in part by an African-American Confederate pilot, Moses Dallas – in 1864, and put into service for the Confederacy. The Water Witch thus served the navies of both sides during the war.

== Other activities at Port Columbus ==
The museum holds an annual symposium, summer camps, and living history programs among the other special events it schedules throughout the year. Another part of the rapidly growing Port Columbus operation is site rental. The museum regularly rents out its galleries for various events from weddings to business meetings.

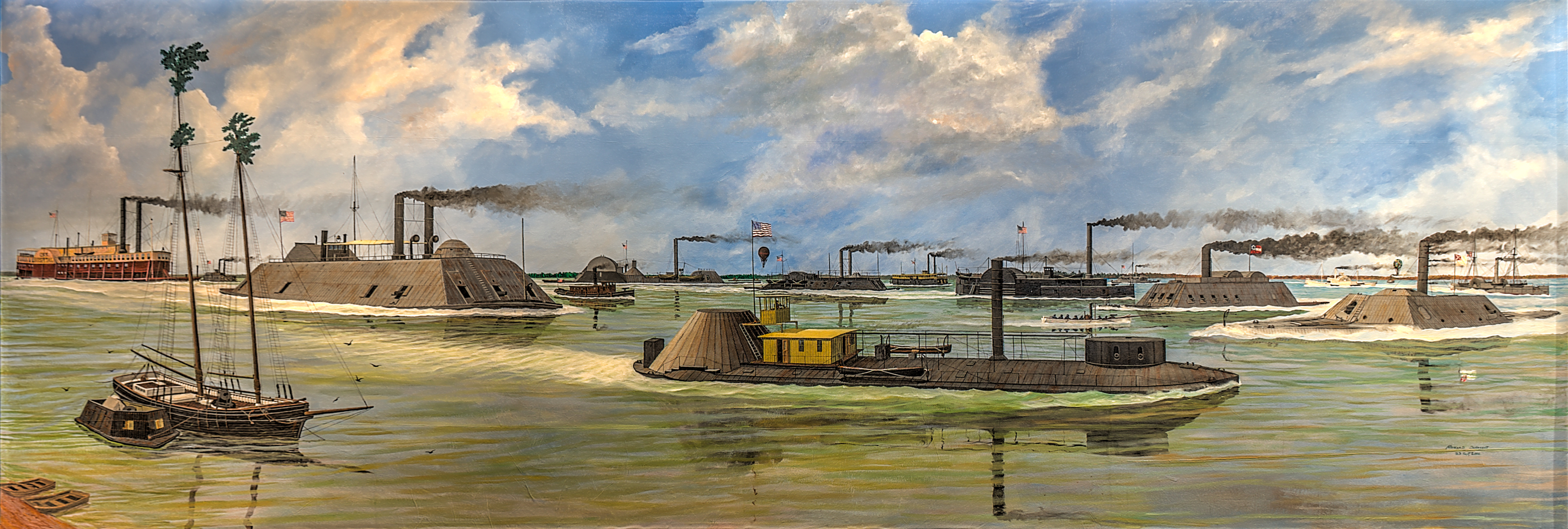
River Campaign Fleets mural

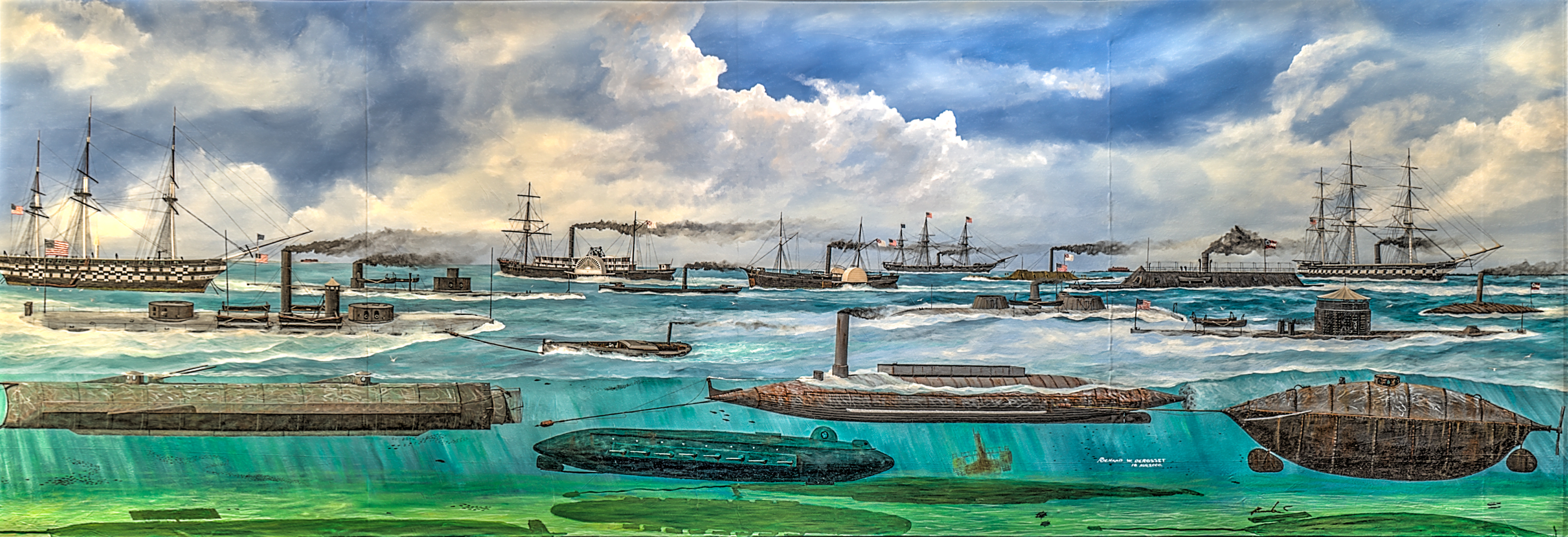
Green Water Fleets Mural

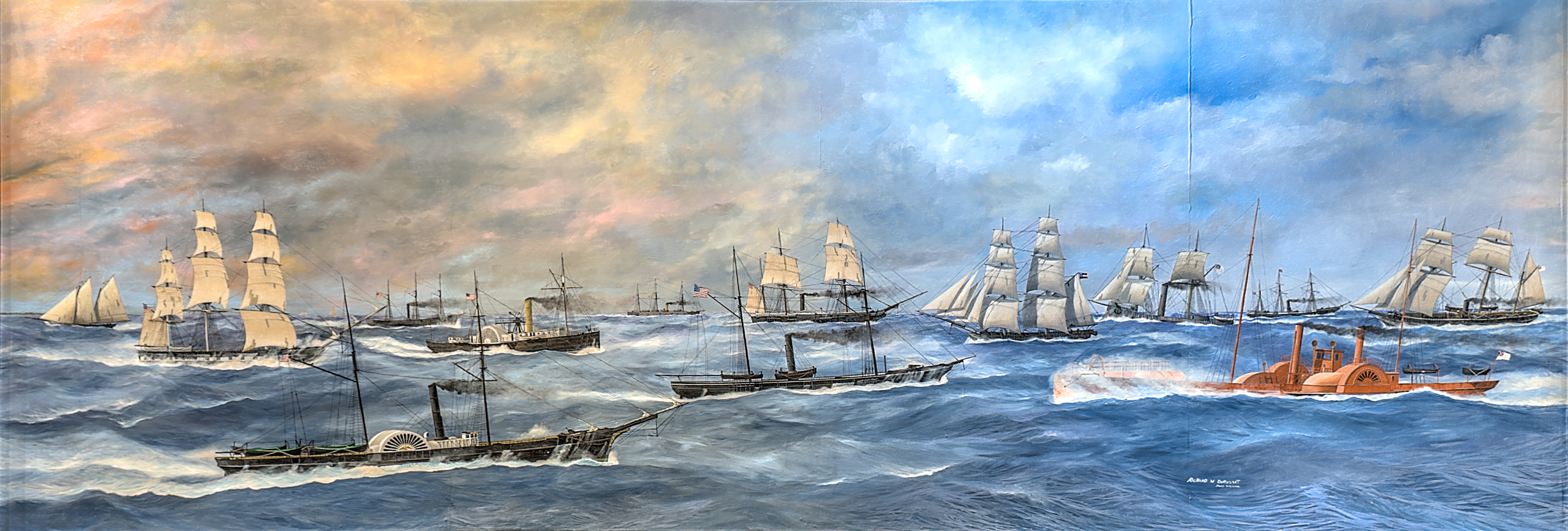
Deep Water Fleets mural

== See also ==
- List of maritime museums in the United States
- List of museum ships
- National Civil War Museum, Harrisburg, Pennsylvania
- Museum of the Confederacy / Confederate White House, Richmond, Virginia
- Confederate Memorial Hall Museum, New Orleans, Louisiana
- President Street Station / Baltimore Civil War Museum; Baltimore, Maryland
- Mariners Museum, Newport News, Virginia
- U.S. Naval Academy Museum, Annapolis, Maryland
