= Cornelia Williams Martin =

American philanthropist, social activist and writer

- Born: December 25, 1818; Utica, New York, U.S.
- Died: July 9, 1899 (aged 80); Auburn, New York, U.S.
- Occupations: philanthropist, social activist, and writer
- Children: 12, including Edward Sanford Martin
- Relatives: Samuel Wells Williams (cousin); Emory Upton (son-in-law); Wilber Elliott Wilder (son-in-law)

Cornelia Williams Martin (December 25, 1818, Utica, New York – July 9, 1899, Auburn, New York) was an American philanthropist, social activist, and writer.

== Early life ==
She was born Cornelia Williams, the daughter of John Williams (1791–1853) and his wife Elizabeth (Leonard) Williams (1792–1850). John Williams had a store in Cazenovia, New York and also owned a variety of mills and properties in town; he served as president of the village three times and in the New York State Assembly in 1829. An older first cousin of Cornelia's was Samuel Wells Williams (1812–1884), who became a notable missionary in China and sinologist; Cornelia helped support his work there.

In 1837 Cornelia Williams married Enos Thompson Throop Martin (1808–1883), a prosperous lawyer and a favorite of his uncle Enos T. Throop, a former governor of New York. In 1850 the couple moved permanently to their summer home, the governor's estate "Willowbrook" on Owasco Lake in Auburn, New York.

== Charitable enterprises ==
Cornelia Williams Martin's first major project was collecting money for the launching of the missionary ship Morning Star in 1856. Cornelia Martin was one of the founders and leaders of the Auburn Female Bible Society, which became active in promoting religious and charitable projects. Through the society she helped found the "Home for the Friendless" in Auburn in 1864, a home for the elderly poor (still in existence, but now known simply as "The Home"). In 1866 a letter from her daughter Eveline, whose husband was stationed in Santa Fe, New Mexico, prompted her to involve the Society in funding a school for Native Americans there. The effort by the Auburn society was joined by other groups and led to the creation of the New Mexico, Arizona and Colorado Missionary Association, later known as the Ladies Board of Missions of the Presbyterian Boards of Domestic and Foreign Missions. The Society also supported The State Asylum for the Criminally Insane in Auburn, which was founded in 1857.

Martin supported the missionary work of her cousin Samuel Wells Williams and others in China. Between 1845 and 1859 she helped raise the funds for the first set of moveable type for printing in Chinese, and in 1867 initiated the idea of creating a professorship in Chinese Language and Literature at Yale and recommended him for the position. After years of lobbying by Martin, Williams was given the new professorship at Yale in 1877, making Yale the first American university to teach Chinese.

In 1877 Martin founded "The Army and Navy Auxiliary" in Washington, DC, which later became the Woman's Army and Navy League.

== Willowbrook ==
Cornelia Williams Martin lived at Willowbrook from 1850 to her death in 1899, managing the social and household affairs. During that time Willowbrook hosted a wide variety of notable political, military, and artistic figures. Jenny Lind sang there in the early 1850s. Visitors included presidents Ulysses S. Grant and Andrew Johnson, Navy Secretary Gideon Welles, General George Custer, Washington Irving, David Farragut, and many others. Secretary of State William H. Seward, a resident of Auburn, was a frequent visitor and held a meeting with foreign diplomats at Willowbrook. He corresponded with the Martins, as did editor Francis Preston Blair; the Blair family were long-time family friends.

== Family ==
Cornelia Martin and her husband E. T. Throop Martin had 12 children.

- Mary Williams Martin (1838–1884) was a talented pianist and helped run the household until her death from tuberculosis.
- Cornelia Eliza Martin (1840–1927) never married, but rumors linked her romantically to cavalryman Myles Keogh who died at the Battle of the Little Big Horn; he was buried in the family plot and she laid flowers on his grave for the rest of her life.
- Harriet Byron Martin (1841–1845) died young.
- Eveline Throop Martin (1843–1922) married cavalryman General A. J. Alexander (1833–1887), and introduced other army men to her sisters. Some of her diaries were published in 1987 as Cavalry Wife: The Diary of Eveline M. Alexander, 1866–1867.
- Enos Throop Martin (1844–1885) went into business until his death at 40 of tuberculosis at the newly popular Saranac Lake treatment center.
- Emily Norwood Martin (1846–1870) married one of the young army officers her sister Eveline introduced to the family, strategist Emory Upton (1839–1881), but died of tuberculosis at 23.
- Eliza Williams Martin (1848–1909) married a lawyer named Grenville Tremaine (1845–1878), a classmate at Union College of her brother "Throop"; he ran unsuccessfully for State Attorney General a year before his untimely death.
- John Williams "Jack" Martin (1850–1903) dropped out of West Point but later served as a captain in the US Cavalry.
- George Bliss Martin (1852–1928) was a businessman and newspaperman.
- Edward Sanford Martin (1856–1939) was a journalist and writer; at Harvard University he co-founded the Harvard Lampoon.
- Violet Blair Martin (1860–1919) also married a military man, General Wilber Elliott Wilder, a Medal of Honor recipient.

== Works ==
- Songs in the House of My Pilgrimage (1852) – edited by "A Lady"; a day-book of inspirational poetry
- A Consecrated Life: Albert Bushnell, Missionary to Africa (1880?) – editor, biography of a missionary
- "Sketch of the Life of Governor Throop" in Collections of the Cayuga County Historical Society number 7, 1889 – biography
- The Old Home: Recollections of Willowbrook
