= CSS Muscogee =

Confederate river warship of American Civil War

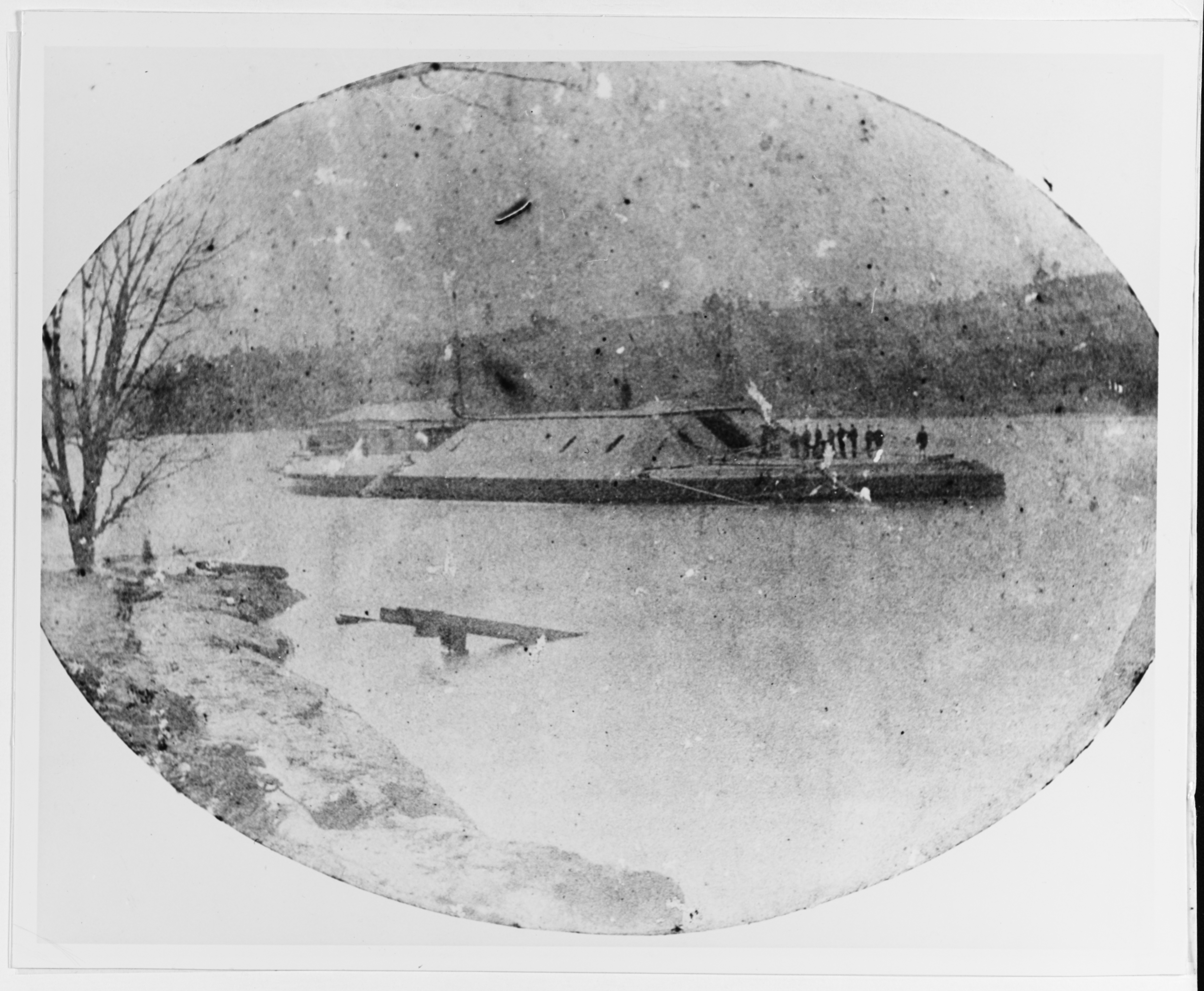
- The incomplete CSS Jackson on the Chattahoochee River, shortly after December 22, 1864

History

Confederate States of America
- Name: Muscogee
- Namesake: Muscogee people
- Builder: Columbus Navy Yard, Columbus, Georgia
- Laid down: 1862
- Launched: December 22, 1864
- Renamed: Jackson, sometime in 1864
- Fate: Burned, April 17, 1865
- Status: Wreck salvaged, 1962–1963; on display at the National Civil War Naval Museum, Columbus, Georgia

General characteristics
- Type: Casemate ironclad
- Tonnage: 1,250 tons
- Length: 223 ft 6 in (68.1 m)
- Beam: 59 ft (18 m)
- Draft: 8 ft (2.4 m)
- Installed power: 4 × boilers
- Propulsion: 2 × propellers; 2 × direct-acting steam engines
- Armament: 4 × 7 in (178 mm) Brooke rifles; 2 × 6.4 in (163 mm) Brooke rifles
- Armor: Casemate: 4 in (102 mm)
- CSS Muscogee and Chattahoochee
- U.S. National Register of Historic Places
- NRHP reference No.: 70000212
- Added to NRHP: May 13, 1970

CSS Muscogee was an casemate ironclad built in Columbus, Georgia for the Confederate States Navy during the American Civil War. Her original paddle configuration was judged a failure when she could not be launched on the first attempt in 1864. She had to be rebuilt to use dual propeller propulsion. Later renamed CSS Jackson and armed with four 7-inch (178 mm) and two 6.4-inch (163 mm) cannons. She was captured while still fitting out and was set ablaze by Union troops in April 1865. Her wreck was salvaged in 1962–1963 and turned over to the National Civil War Naval Museum in Columbus for display. The ironclad's remains were listed on the National Register of Historic Places in 1970.

== Background and description ==
Muscogee was originally built as a sister ship to the casemate ironclad paddle steamer CSS Missouri, to a rough design by the Chief Naval Constructor, John L. Porter, as a sternwheel-powered ironclad. She proved to be too heavy to be launched on January 1, 1864, and had to be reconstructed and lengthened to a modified CSS Albemarle-class design, based on Porter's advice during his visit to the ironclad on January 23.

As part of the reconstruction, the ironclad was lengthened to 223 feet 6 inches (68.1 m) overall after a new fantail was built on the stern. She had a beam of 59 feet (18 m) and a draft of 8 feet (2.4 m). The removal of her sternwheel allowed her casemate to be shortened by 54 feet (16.5 m), which saved a considerable amount of weight. The ironclad had a gross register tonnage of 1,250 tons.

As originally designed, Muscogee was propelled by a sternwheel that was partially enclosed by a recess at the aft end of the casemate; the upper portion of the paddle wheel protruded above the casemate and would have been exposed to enemy fire. The sternwheel was probably powered by a pair of inclined two-cylinder direct-acting steam engines taken from the steamboat Time using steam provided by four return-flue boilers to the engines. As part of her reconstruction, Time's engines were replaced by a pair of single-cylinder, horizontal direct-acting steam engines from the adjacent Columbus Naval Iron Works, each of which drove a single 7-foot-6-inch (2.3 m) propeller; the original boilers appear to have been retained.

Muscogee's casemate was built with ten gun ports, two each at the bow and stern and three on the broadside. The ship was armed with four 7-inch (178 mm) and two 6.4-inch (163 mm) Brooke rifles. The fore and aft cannons were on pivot gun mounts. The 7-inch guns weighed about 15,300 pounds (6,900 kg) and fired 110-pound (50 kg) shells. The equivalent statistics for the 6.4-inch gun were 10,700 pounds (4,900 kg) with 95-pound (43 kg) shells. The casemate was protected by 4 inches (102 mm) of wrought-iron armor, and the armor plates on the deck and sides of the fantail were 2 inches (51 mm) thick.

== History ==
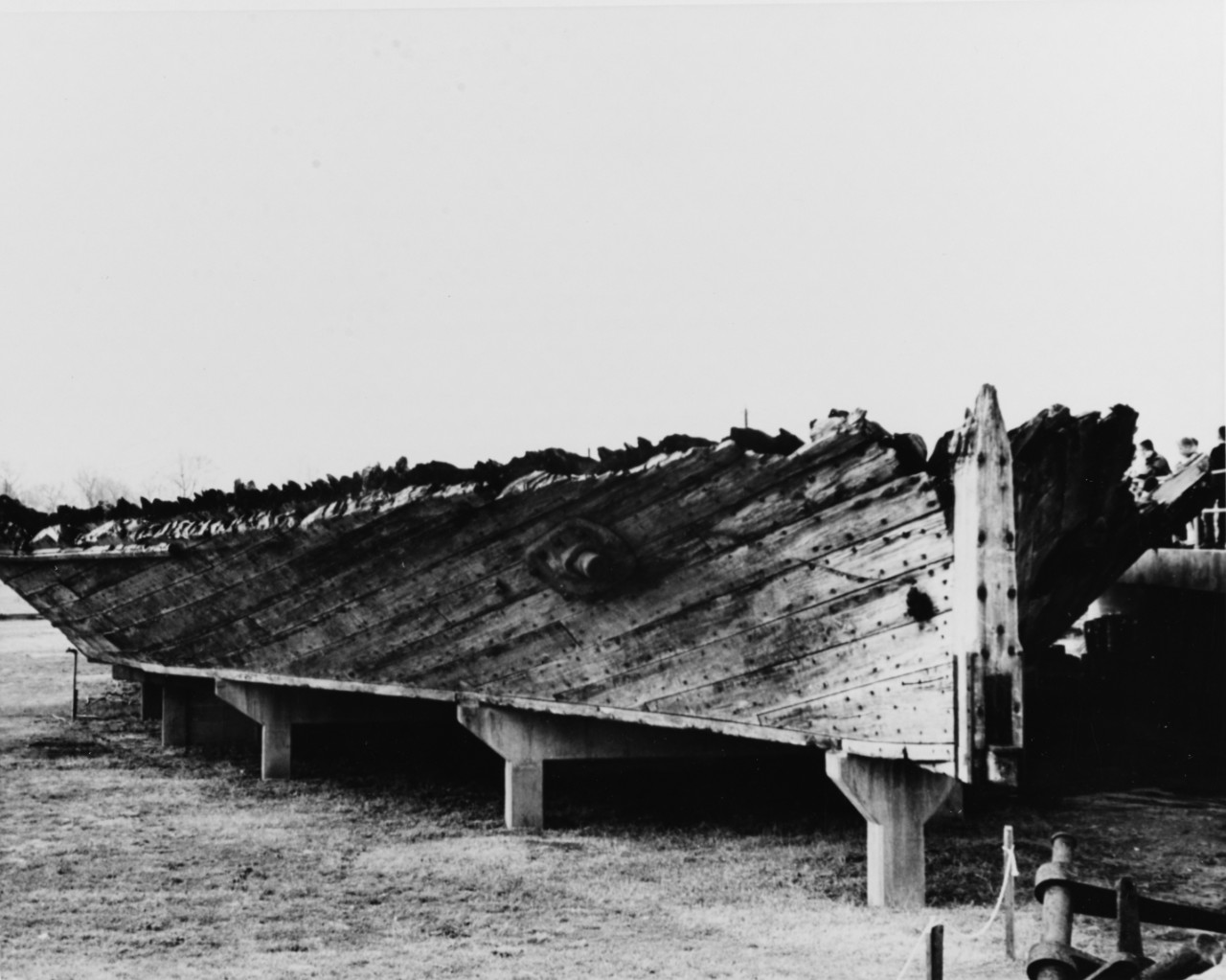
The hull of Jackson after recovery

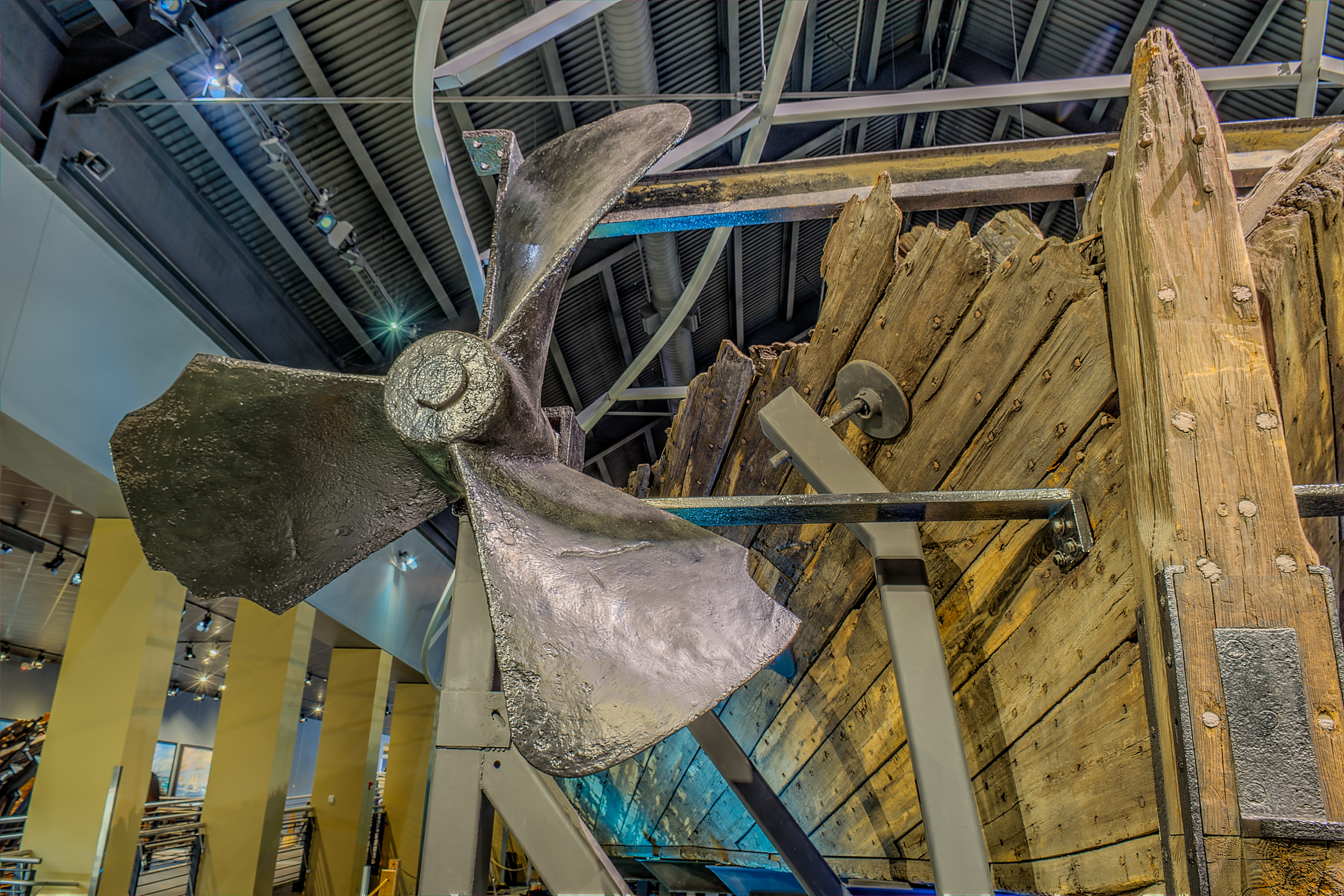
CSS Jackson's propeller at the National Civil War Naval Museum

Muscogee was laid down during 1862 at the Columbus Naval Yard at Columbus, Georgia, on the banks of the Chattahoochee River. The first attempt to launch her failed on January 1, 1864, despite the high water on the river and the assistance of the steamboat Mariana. Porter came down afterwards to examine the ironclad and recommended that she be rebuilt with screw propulsion rather than the sternwheel. She was finally launched on December 22, having been renamed Jackson at some point during the year. A shortage of iron plate greatly hindered the ironclad's completion.

On April 17, 1865, after the Union's Wilson's Raiders captured the city during the Battle of Columbus, Georgia, Jackson was set ablaze by Union troops while still fitting out and had her moorings cut. The ship drifted downriver some 30 miles (48 km) and ran aground on a sandbar. She was not thought to be worth salvaging because of the fire damage, but the Army Corps of Engineers dredged around her wreck in 1910 and salvaged her machinery. A Union cavalry officer's report of the ironclad's condition at the time of her capture said that she had four cannon aboard and had a solid oak ram 15 feet (4.6 m) deep. The only detail about her armor that he recorded was that it curved over the edge of the deck and extended below the waterline.

=== Recovery ===
CSS Jackson's remains were raised in two pieces; the 106-foot (32.3 m) stern section in 1962 and the 74-foot (22.6 m) bow section the following year. They were then placed on exhibit at the National Civil War Naval Museum in Columbus. A thick metal white frame outline, indicating the various dimensions of Jackson's original fore and aft deck arrangements and armored casemate, is now erected directly above the hull's wooden remains to simulate for visitors the ironclad's original size and shapes. The ship's fantail, which was stored outside in a pole barn, was destroyed on 1 June 2020 in a series of arson attacks.

The ironclad was listed on the National Register of Historic Places on May 13, 1970.

== See also ==
- Bibliography of American Civil War naval history
