= James H. Wilson =

United States Army officer (1837-1925)

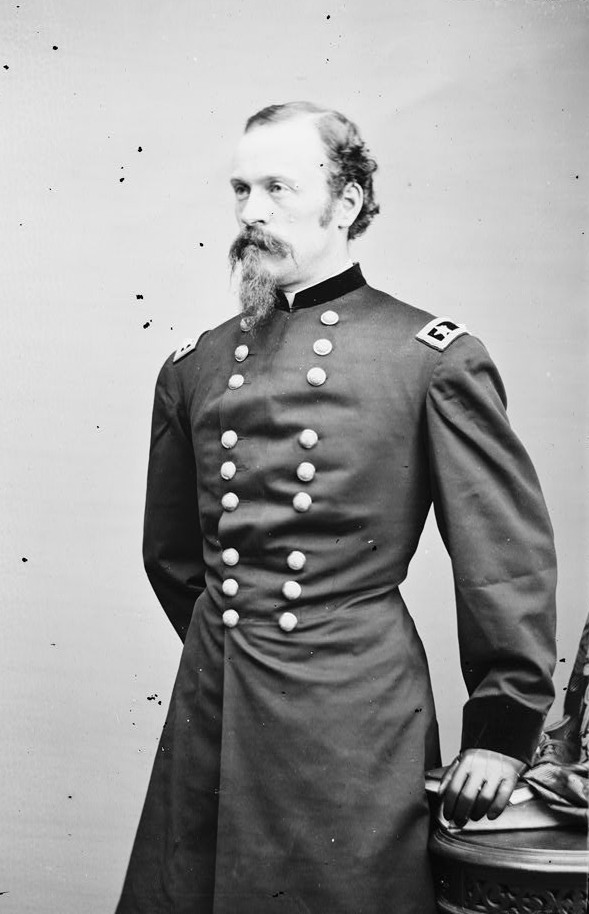
- Wilson in 1865
- Born: James Harrison Wilson; September 2, 1837; Shawneetown, Illinois, US
- Died: February 23, 1925 (aged 87); Wilmington, Delaware, US
- Burial place: Old Swedes Episcopal Church Cemetery, Wilmington
- Relatives: Jim Thompson (grandson)
- Military career
- Allegiance: United States
- Branch: United States Army
- Service years: 1860–1870; 1898–1901
- Rank: Major General
- Commands: Cavalry Corps, Military Division of the Mississippi
- Conflicts: American Civil War; Battle of Fort Pulaski; Siege of Corinth; Battle of South Mountain; Battle of Antietam; Battle of Champion Hill; Siege of Vicksburg; Battle of Chickamauga; Third Battle of Chattanooga; Battle of Yellow Tavern; Siege of Petersburg; Third Battle of Winchester; Battle of Franklin; Battle of Nashville; Wilson's Raid; Battle of Selma; Battle of Columbus; Spanish-American War; Puerto Rico Campaign; Boxer Rebellion

James Harrison Wilson (September 2, 1837 – February 23, 1925) was an American military officer, topographic engineer and a Major General in the Union Army during the American Civil War. He initially served as an aide to Major General George B. McClellan during the Maryland Campaign before joining Major General Ulysses S. Grant's army in the Western Theater, where he was promoted to brigadier general. In 1864, he transferred from engineering to the cavalry, where he displayed notable leadership in many engagements of the Overland Campaign. However, his attempt to destroy Lee's supply lines failed when he was routed by a much smaller force of Confederate irregulars.

Returning to the Western Theater, Wilson became one of the few Union commanders to defeat Confederate cavalier Nathan Bedford Forrest in battle. He achieved this feat at the Battle of Franklin in November 1864 and again during his raid through Alabama and Georgia in March and April 1865. Wilson ended the war with his men capturing both Confederate President Jefferson Davis and Andersonville Prison commandant Henry Wirz in May 1865. At the time of his death in 1925, he was the fourth-to-last living Union Civil War general.

== Early life and engineering ==
Wilson was born in Shawneetown, Illinois. He attended McKendree College for a year and graduated from the United States Military Academy in 1860, sixth in his class of 41, receiving a commission as a brevet second lieutenant in the Topographical Engineers. His initial assignment was assistant topographical engineer of the Department of Oregon at Fort Vancouver.

== Civil War ==
=== Engineering assignments ===
After the start of the Civil War, Wilson received promotions to second and first lieutenant and became the topographical engineer for the Port Royal Expeditionary Force, from September 1861 to March 1862. As the topographical engineer for the Department of the South, he took part in the Battle of Fort Pulaski at the mouth of the Savannah River and received a brevet promotion to major in the regular army for his service. He transferred to the Army of the Potomac in April 1862 and served as its topographic engineer, but also as an aide-de-camp to Maj. Gen. George B. McClellan. He served under McClellan during the Maryland Campaign and was present at the battles of South Mountain and Antietam.

Wilson was transferred to the Western Theater and joined Maj. Gen. Ulysses S. Grant's Army of the Tennessee as a lieutenant colonel and topographical engineer. During the Vicksburg Campaign, he was the inspector general of Grant's army. On October 30, 1863, he was promoted to brigadier general of volunteers. He continued on staff duty during the Battle of Chattanooga and was chief engineer of the force sent to relieve Knoxville under Maj. Gen. William T. Sherman.

=== Cavalry commands ===
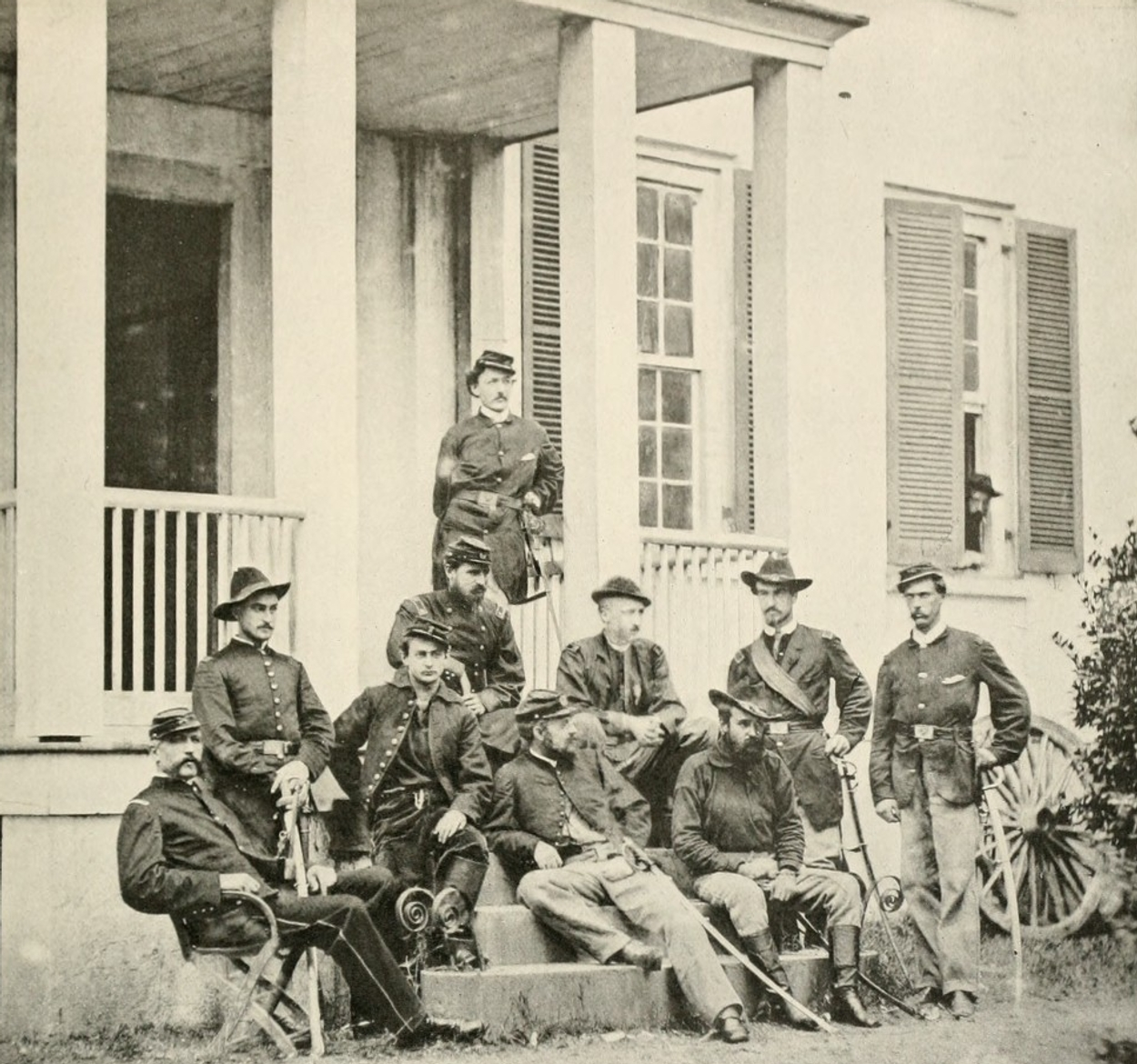
Union Cavalry General James Harrison Wilson & staff

In 1864, Wilson switched from engineering to the cavalry. On February 17, 1864, he was assigned as chief of the Cavalry Bureau in Washington, D.C. He was an excellent administrator and organizer, but his true talents turned out to be as a combat leader. Grant promoted him to brevet major general on May 6, 1864, and had him assigned to command a division of cavalry under Maj. Gen. Philip Sheridan, which he did with boldness and skill in numerous fights of the Overland Campaign and in the Valley Campaigns of 1864.

General Wilson's ill-fated joint adventure with General Brigadier General August V. Kautz was launched through General Grant's strategy of interdicting Robert E. Lee's supply lines to Petersburg, Virginia. If this could be done, Lee would be compelled to abandon Petersburg. General Wilson was ordered to conduct a cavalry raid that would destroy the tracks of the South Side and Richmond & Danville railroads, and to destroy the key R&D railroad bridge over the Staunton River. The raid began on June 22, 1864, with over 5,000 Cavalry troops and 16 pieces of artillery. During the first three days of their raid, Wilson's cavalry tore up 60 miles of track and burned two trains and several railroad stations. Confederate General W. H. F. "Rooney" Lee pursued the Union raid, but was ineffective. The audacious raid seemed to be wildly successful, though not uncontested, and the Staunton River Bridge loomed as the great objective. The railroad bridge was over a small but deep river, the Staunton. The Confederacy had sensed its strategic importance, putting a small fort there under Captain Benjamin Farinholt, and his 296 reserve troops. A valiant stand by local volunteers of old men and boys, with help from surrounding counties, gathered almost a force of nearly 1,000, which halted the 5,000 well-armed troops. Wilson’s cavalry fought the action dismounted. "Rooney" Lee's cavalry came up during the engagement's end, and routed Wilson's troops. There has been speculation that this damaged an otherwise brilliant career for Wilson.

However, just before Sheridan's decisive Battle of Cedar Creek in October 1864, Wilson was upgraded to brevet major general of volunteers and transferred back to the West to become chief of cavalry for the Military Division of the Mississippi under Sherman.

As cavalry chief, he trained Sherman's cavalry (under Brig. Gen. Judson Kilpatrick) for the March to the Sea. Rather than accompanying Sherman, however, he and 17,000 troopers were attached to Maj. Gen. George H. Thomas's Army of the Cumberland for the Franklin-Nashville Campaign in November and December 1864. His repulse of a flanking attack by Maj. Gen. Nathan Bedford Forrest was instrumental in saving the Union Army at the Battle of Franklin; Wilson was one of only a few Union officers to best the legendary Southern cavalryman. He was promoted to brevet brigadier general in the regular army for his service in the Battle of Nashville. He led the successful Wilson's Raid through Alabama and Georgia, defeating the smaller force of Forrest and capturing Selma, Alabama, along with four other fortified cities. In this campaign, he commanded the troops that burned most of the buildings of the University of Alabama. On Easter Day, 1865, his troops assaulted and captured the city of Columbus, Georgia. His men did enormous damage to the military infrastructure of the South, but they did it with a sense of discipline that usually prevented looting and other collateral damage to civilian property. April 28, 1865, an order proclaiming peace is received as General John Schofield is assigned North Carolina, General Quincy Adams Gillmore assigned South Carolina and General Wilson assigned the state of Georgia as post war construction began. He was promoted to brevet major general in the regular army for his performance at Selma and received his full promotion to major general on May 6, 1865. In central Georgia, the cavalrymen under Wilson's command captured Confederate President Jefferson Davis, and Captain Henry Wirz, the commandant of Andersonville, as he fled through Georgia in May 1865. Wilson's administration of post-war Georgia was regarded, in some cases, as enlightened. In his History of the State of Georgia from 1850 to 1881, the historian I.W. Avery remarks:

In many particulars the Federal soldiers acted very cleverly. Gen. [James H.] Wilson turned over to Gen. Ira Foster the Confederate mules, horses, wagons, and harness, for distribution to the poor, and Col. J.H.R Washington of Macon, was associated with Gen. Foster to aid in the distribution.

On June 24, 1865, in General Order #31, General Wilson expressed appreciation to Foster and Washington, and relieved them of their authority, placing the task with Capt. R. Carter, A.Q.M., Cavalry Corps Military Division of the Mississippi.

At the end of the war, Wilson reverted to the rank of lieutenant colonel and was assigned to the newly created 35th U.S. Infantry, but his duty assignments continued to be in the Corps of Engineers until he resigned from the Army in December 1870.

== Later life and wars ==
After he left the Army, Wilson worked as a railroad construction engineer and executive. He moved to Wilmington, Delaware, in 1883. For the next 15 years he devoted his time to business, travel, and public affairs, and wrote on a number of subjects.

Wilson returned to the Army in 1898 for the Spanish–American War, and served as a major general of volunteers in Cuba and Puerto Rico. While in Cuba as commander of the department of Matanzas and Santa Clara, his aide-de-camp was William J. Glasgow. Wilson also saw service in China during the Boxer Rebellion in 1901 as brigadier general. Retiring from the Army, in 1902 he represented President Theodore Roosevelt at the coronation of Edward VII of the United Kingdom.

He was a Veteran Companion of the District of Columbia Commander of the Military Order of the Loyal Legion of the United States (MOLLUS) – a military society of Union officers and their descendants. He was assigned MOLLUS insignia number 12106.

== Death ==
Wilson died in Wilmington, Delaware, in 1925, with only three Union Civil War generals living longer.

He is buried in the Old Swedes Churchyard in Wilmington.

== Works ==
- The Life of General U. S. Grant, General of the Armies of the United States (co-authored with Charles A. Dana, 1868)
- The Life and Letters of Emory Upton colonel of the Fourth regiment of artillery, and brevet major-general, U.S. army (co-authored with Peter Smith Michie, 1885)
- China: Travels and Investigations in the Middle Kingdom—a Study of its Civilization and Possibilities, with a Glance at Japan (1887)
- Life and Services of Brevet Brigadier-General Andrew Jonathan Alexander, United States Army (1887)
- Heroes of the Great Conflict: Life and Services of William Farrar Smith, Major General, United States Volunteers in the Civil War (1904)
- The Life of Charles A. Dana (1907)
- The Campaign of Chancellorsville (1911)
- Under the Old Flag: Recollections of Military Operations in the War for the Union, the Spanish War, the Boxer Rebellion, etc. (1912)
- The Life of John A. Rawlins: Lawyer, Assistant Adjutant-General, Chief of Staff, Major General of Volunteers, and Secretary of War (1916)

== See also ==
- List of American Civil War Generals (Union)
- Puerto Rican Campaign
