= Neighborhoods in Columbus, Georgia =

This is the list of neighborhoods in Columbus, Georgia. Neighborhoods are generally considered to be housing subdivisions of a city. In some cases, other layers of intervening organization exist (for example, boroughs in New York City) that may not exist in all places. In the city of Columbus, there exist an intermediate level of organization, called districts or zones.

== List ==
- Downtown
  - Avondale
  - Baker Village
  - Bibb City
  - City Village
  - Willett
- East Columbus
  - Kingsridge
  - Vista Estates
  - Belvedere Park
  - Columbia Heights
  - Mount Pleasant
  - Dimon Wood
  - Forest Park
  - Crystal Valley
  - Englewood
  - Flat Rock
  - Sweetwater
  - Oakcrest
  - Glen Arden
  - Midland
  - Schatulga
  - Upatoi
  - Woodlawn Estates
- Midtown
  - Averett Woods
  - Briarwood
  - Clubview Heights
  - Dimon Circle
  - Dinglewood
  - East Carver Heights
  - East Highland
  - East Wynnton
  - Garrard Woods
  - Hilton Heights
  - Lindsay Creek-Boxwood
  - Overlook-Wynn's Hill
  - Peacock Woods
  - Radcliff
  - Village of Wynnton
  - Weracoba - St. Elmo A/K/A Lakebottom
  - Wildwood Circle - Hillcrest
  - Woodcrest
  - Wynnton Grove
- North Columbus A/K/A Northside
  - Allendale
  - Caroline Park
  - Fortson
  - Glenns
  - Green Island Hills
  - Highland Pines
    - Nankipooh
  - Lyn Hills
  - Woodbriar
- South Columbus
  - Benning Park
  - Carter Acres
  - Oakland Park
  - Pine Hill
  - Riverland Terrace
  - Vista Terrance
