= METRA Transit System =

Bus transportation provider in Muscogee County, Georgia

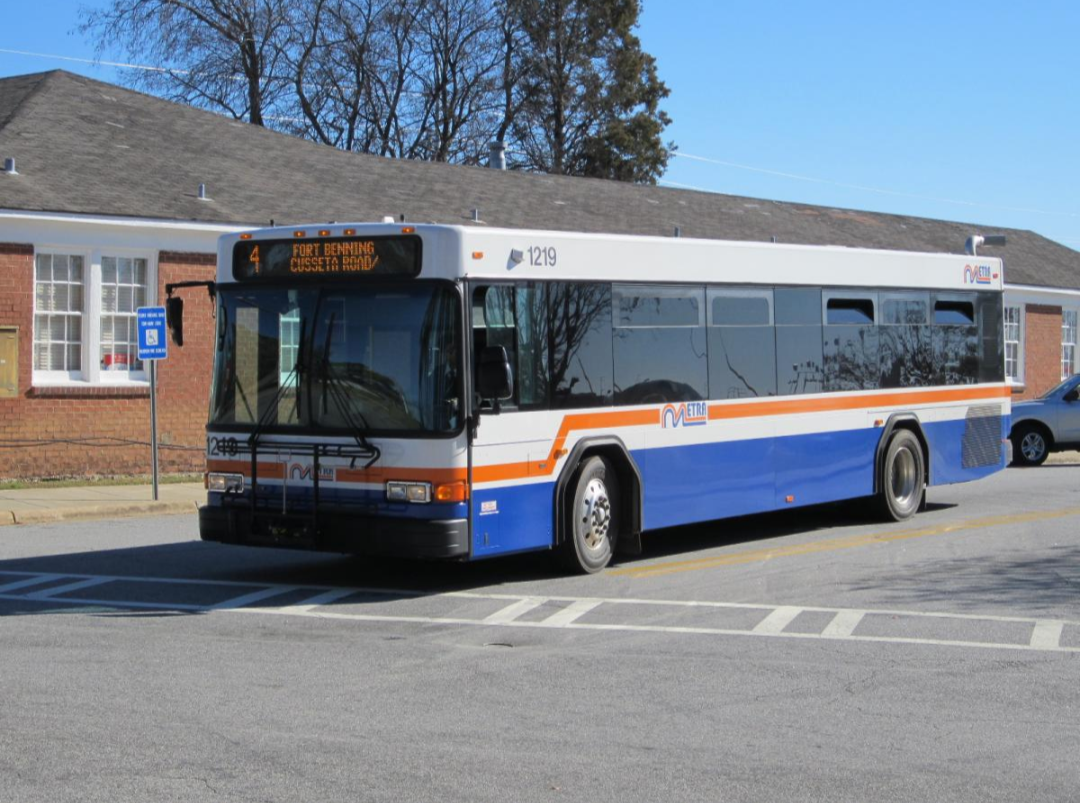
- A METRA Transit Bus
- Founded: 1924 (as the Columbus Transportation Company)
- Headquarters: 814 Linwood Blvd.
- Locale: Columbus, Georgia, United States
- Service area: Muscogee County
- Service type: Bus service, paratransit
- Routes: 10
- Stations: 1
- Website: METRA

The Metropolitan (METRA) Transit System is the primary provider of mass transportation in Muscogee County, Georgia, United States. The agency is the successor to the Columbus Transportation Company, a privately owned bus company founded in 1924 that had operated as the primary bus service in Columbus and Phenix City. In 1967, the city of Columbus purchased the Columbus Transportation Company and its assets after the company's bus services became unprofitable, with the city renaming the now public entity the Columbus Transportation System (later renamed METRA). In 1978, METRA assumed certain bus routes to nearby Fort Benning, which had been operated by Howard Bus Lines, a privately owned bus and cab company that ceased operations and filed for bankruptcy in 1978. Currently, ten routes serve the city, providing service Monday through Saturday.

== Routes ==
- 1 East Wynnton
- 2 Cusseta Rd/Oakland Park
- 3 St. Mary's Rd/Buena Vista Rd/Schatugla Rd
- 4 Fort Benning
- 5 North Highland/Columbus State/Peachtree Mall
- 6 Columbus State/Milgen Rd
- 7 South Columbus
- 9 Bradley Park/Columbus Park Crossing
- 10 Airport Thruway/Veterans Parkway
- 12 Veterans Parkway/Civic Center/Victory Drive
