= North Columbus, Georgia =

Coordinates: 32°32′40″N 84°56′30″W

North Columbus, sometimes referred to as "Northside," is a district in Columbus, Georgia, situated just north of the district of Bibb City. It is bounded roughly by Moore Road on the north, Manchester Expressway to the south, Moon Road on the east, and J. R. Allen Parkway on the west.

== Culture ==
Columbus Park Crossing

North Columbus is home to many hotels (most by Marriott), including Courtyard, Fairfield Inn, SpringHill Suites, Residence Inn, Homewood Suites by Hilton, and Candlewood Suites. North Columbus is also home to Columbus Park Crossing, an outdoor strip mall, and Piedmont Columbus Regional Northside Hospital, a division of Piedmont Healthcare.

== Neighborhoods ==
The following are neighborhoods in North Columbus:

- Allendale
- Caroline Park
- Glenns
- Green Island Hills
- Highland Oldtown
- Ivy Park

== Communities ==
Nankipooh - named in the late 1890s as a railroad stop. Highland Pines, Old Town Columbus and Victory Heights subdivisions are located within the Nankipooh Community.

== Tornado events ==
Major damage to an Eckerds Pharmacy

On March 1, 2007, an EF2 tornado ripped through North Columbus, causing many power outages and an extreme amount of damage. While there were dozens of injuries, there were no fatalities.

On March 3, 2019, another tornado impacted far northwestern parts of the area, damaging some homes and bringing down trees and a cell tower near U.S. Route 27 (Veterans Pkwy) and Almond Rd. No injuries or fatalities occurred.
