= Pine Hill (Columbus, Georgia) =

Coordinates: 32°25′35″N 84°56′10″W

- Neighborhood
- Interactive map of Pine Hill
- Country: United States
- State: Georgia
- County: Muscogee
- City: Columbus

Area
  - Total: 0.124 sq mi (0.32 km^{2})

Population (2007)
  - Total: 457
  - Density: 3,176/sq mi (1,226.3/km^{2})
- Time zone: UTC-5 (EST)
  - Summer (DST): UTC-4 (EDT)
- Zip code: 31903

Pine Hill is a neighborhood located in South Columbus, Georgia, near Fort Benning.
