= Neighborhoods in Columbus =

Neighborhoods in Columbus may refer to:

- Neighborhoods in Columbus, Ohio
- Neighborhoods in Columbus, Georgia
