= Lyn Hills (Columbus, Georgia) =

Coordinates: 32°32′20″N 84°55′30″W

Lyn Hills is a neighborhood located in Columbus, Georgia. It is located in the northern section of the city.
