= Lakebottom =

- a lakebed, the bottom of a lake
- Camp Lakebottom
- Topher Payne works "Lakebottom Proper" in 2011 and "Lakebottom Prime" in 2013
- Weracoba - St. Elmo in MidTown (Columbus, Georgia) one of the neighborhoods in Columbus, Georgia
