= City Village (Columbus, Georgia) =

Neighborhood in Columbus, Georgia, US

Coordinates: 32°29′20″N 84°59′20″W

City Village is a neighborhood in Columbus, Georgia. It is located north of the central business district of Downtown, and south of Bibb City. It is part of the nonprofit neighborhood revitalization effort called the Mill District.
