= Willett (Columbus, Georgia) =

Neighborhood, Columbus, Georgia, U.S.

Coordinates: 32.4482°N 84.9567°W

Willett is a neighborhood in Columbus, Georgia. It is located southwest of the central business district of Downtown.
