= Shannon Hosiery Mill =

Former American mill

Coordinates: 32°29′14″N 84°58′22″W

The Shannon Hosiery Mill, Inc. was incorporated in Columbus, GA on November 8, 1938. The one story mill sat on a 5 ½ acre lot 1338 Talbotton Ave in the northeastern side of Columbus. The cost of the buildings and the grounds was around $100,000. It produced silk hosiery for the southeast region of the United States. The first president was N.S. Illges, and vice president was J.P. Illges. Other officers included W.T. Cothran as secretary and treasurer and E.C. Alford as assistant secretary. Shannon Hosiery Mill, Inc. targeted the southeast region. By 1955, J Chadbourn Bolles had become the new president of the mill.

The mill facility was sold in 1958. The Muscogee Board of Education purchased the Shannon Hosiery Mill property for $250,000. The building was renovated and became a short-term home for the new junior college, Columbus College. By 1980 the mill site was owned by the Muscogee County School District. In 1988, the old mill building was destroyed, but would not be forgotten. In 2008, a historic marker for the mills was placed off Warm Springs Road. According to the historic marker, "more than 20,000 bricks from the mill's old smokestack were salvaged and cleaned by college faculty, staff and students and were used to line the inner arches of the Whitley Clock Tower, built in 1991 in the center of the CSU main campus." Today, Hannan Academy is located on the site where the old mill stood.
