= Highland Pines (Columbus, Georgia) =

- Neighborhood
- Location in Georgia
- Coordinates: 32.560°N 84.952°W
- Country: United States
- State: Georgia
- County: Muscogee
- City: Columbus
- Time zone: UTC-5 (EST)
  - Summer (DST): UTC-4 (EDT)
- ZIP codes: 31909
- Area codes: 706, 762

Highland Pines is a residential subdivision in the Nankipooh Community (unincorporated) of Columbus, Muscogee County, Georgia. Highland Pines was developed in the late 1940s and early 1950s consisting of small single family homes.
