= South Columbus, Georgia =

Coordinates: 32.4527°N 84.9906°W

- District
- Nickname: Southside
- Interactive map of South Columbus, Georgia
- Country: United States
- State: Georgia
- County: Muscogee

Population (2007)
  - Total: 14,342
- ZIP code: 31903
- Area code: 706

South Columbus, sometimes called the southside, is a residential district of Columbus, Georgia, situated just south of the financial district of Downtown Columbus and north of Fort Benning, one of the largest United States Army bases. In 2007, South Columbus had a population of 14,342.

== Attractions ==
- The National Infantry Museum, a museum that honors the history of infantry forces in the United States Army.
- Oxbow Meadows, a park that has many walking trails, a learning center, and various insect and animal displays. It includes the Oxbow Creek Golf Course, a 9-hole golf course mostly used by the residents of South Columbus.

== Neighborhoods ==
The following are neighborhoods in South Columbus:

- Benning Park
- Carter Acres
- Oakland Park
- Pine Hill
- Riverland Terrace
- Vista Terrance

Willis plaza
