= Clubview Heights (Columbus, Georgia) =

Neighborhood in Georgia, United States

- Neighborhood
- Interactive map of Clubview Heights
- Coordinates: 32°29′40″N 84°57′0″W
- Country: United States
- State: Georgia
- City: Columbus
- Section: Midtown

Area
  - Total: 0.50 sq mi (1.3 km^{2})

Population (2007)
  - Total: 938
- Time zone: UTC-5 (EST)
  - Summer (DST): UTC-4 (EDT)
- Zip code: 31906

Clubview Heights is a neighborhood located in the Midtown section of Columbus, Georgia.
