= Glenns (Columbus, Georgia) =

- Neighborhood
- Location in Georgia
- Coordinates: 32.5307°N 84.9508°W
- Country: United States
- State: Georgia
- County: Muscogee
- City: Columbus
- Time zone: UTC-5 (EST)
  - Summer (DST): UTC-4 (EDT)
- ZIP codes: 31909
- Area codes: 706, 762

Glenns is a residential neighborhood in Columbus, Georgia. In recent years, Glenns has been overrun with many new houses, with most ranging in the $300,000 range. Many of the people residing there are of the Jewish faith.
