= Peachtree Mall =

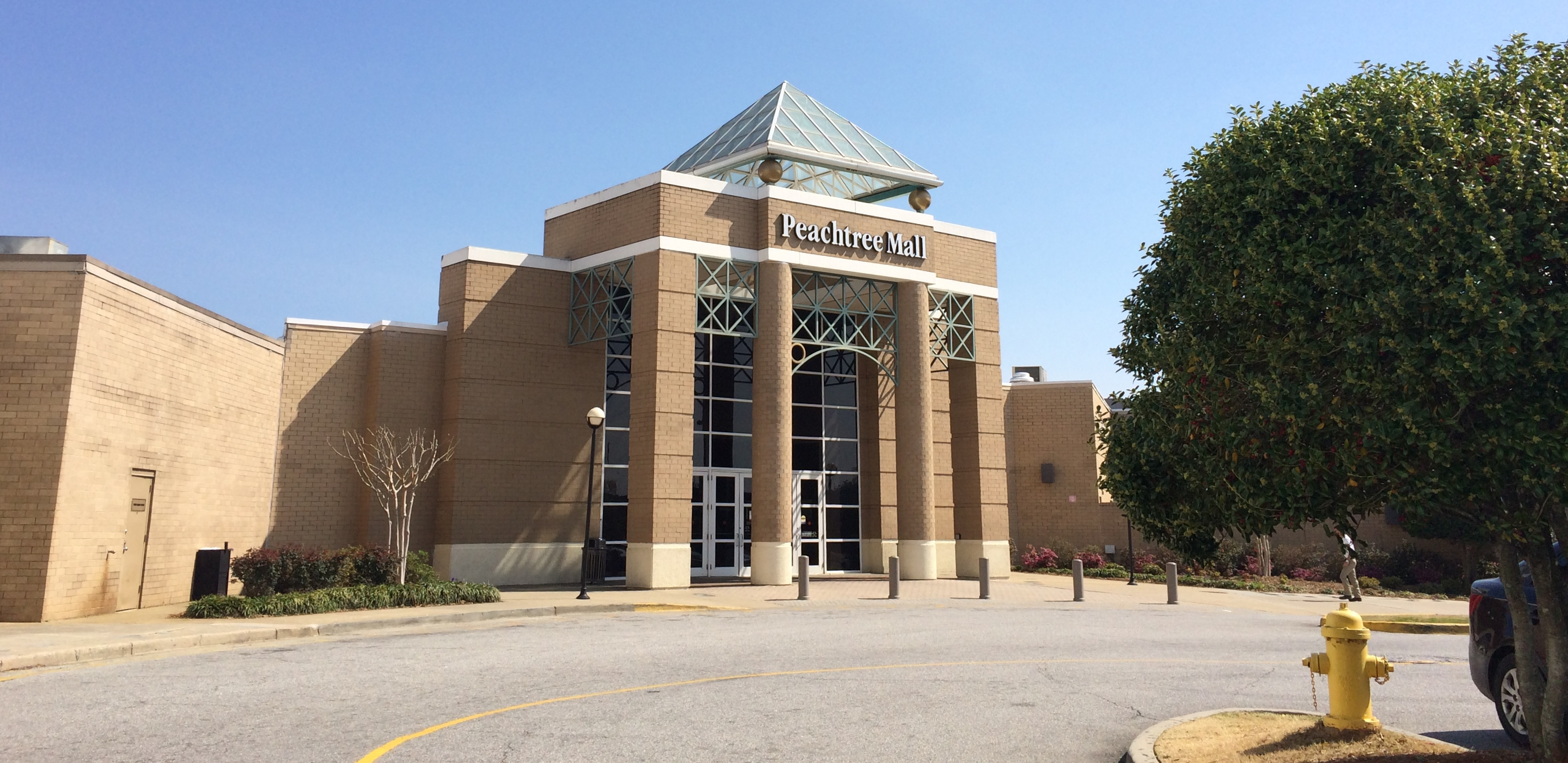
- Main entrance, March 2014
- Location: Columbus, Georgia, United States
- Coordinates: 32.50883°N 84.94127°W
- Opened: August 5, 1975; 51 years ago
- Developer: Jim Wilson and Associates for the California Retirement Trust
- Manager: The Woodmont Company as of September 2026 receivership order
- Owner: Peachtree Mall LLC
- Num. of stores: 87
- Num. of anchor tenants: 4
- Floor area: 809,653 square feet (75,219.2 m^{2})
- Floors: 1 (Dillard's has 2)
- Parking: 4,200 spaces
- Website: www.peachtreemall.com

Peachtree Mall is a shopping mall in Columbus, Georgia. After the closing and demolition of Columbus Square Mall in the early 2000s, Peachtree Mall is the only enclosed shopping center in the city. Peachtree Mall is one of two major shopping areas in Columbus, the other being Columbus Park Crossing. The mall's anchor stores are Beauty Master, Dillard's, Macy's, and JCPenney.

== History and layout ==
The original design of the mall was a single-level with anchor stores Gayfers and Montgomery Ward on each end of the primary corridor. A food court was added along with a 3rd anchor store, Parisian in 1985.

An addition to the mall was completed in November 1994 when JCPenney relocated to the mall from its previous Columbus Square Mall location. An oddity of this expansion was that to reach the addition from the existing mall, one must walk through Dillard's (formerly Gayfer's). Montgomery Ward closed in late 2000 when the company filed for bankruptcy.

Rich's opened in 2002, replacing Montgomery Ward. The named changed to Macy's in 2005.

Parisian closed in February 2007 following the company merger with Belk. It was announced in 2007 that the former Parisian location would be converted into a Belk, which was scheduled to open in late 2007; however the plans for a Belk location was scrapped in late 2006 due to financial problems. A redevelopment is planned for the former Parisian's store that was owned by Dillard's in 2007, but never materialized, so on Thursday December 3, 2015, Peachtree Mall's owners bought it back from Dillard's. At Home opened in the former Parisian space on February 2, 2017 and closed on December 30, 2024. Beauty Master opened in the space in November 1, 2025.
