= Columbus Historic Riverfront Industrial District =

Historic district in Columbus, Georgia, US - a US National Landmark

- U.S. National Register of Historic Places
- U.S. National Historic Landmark District
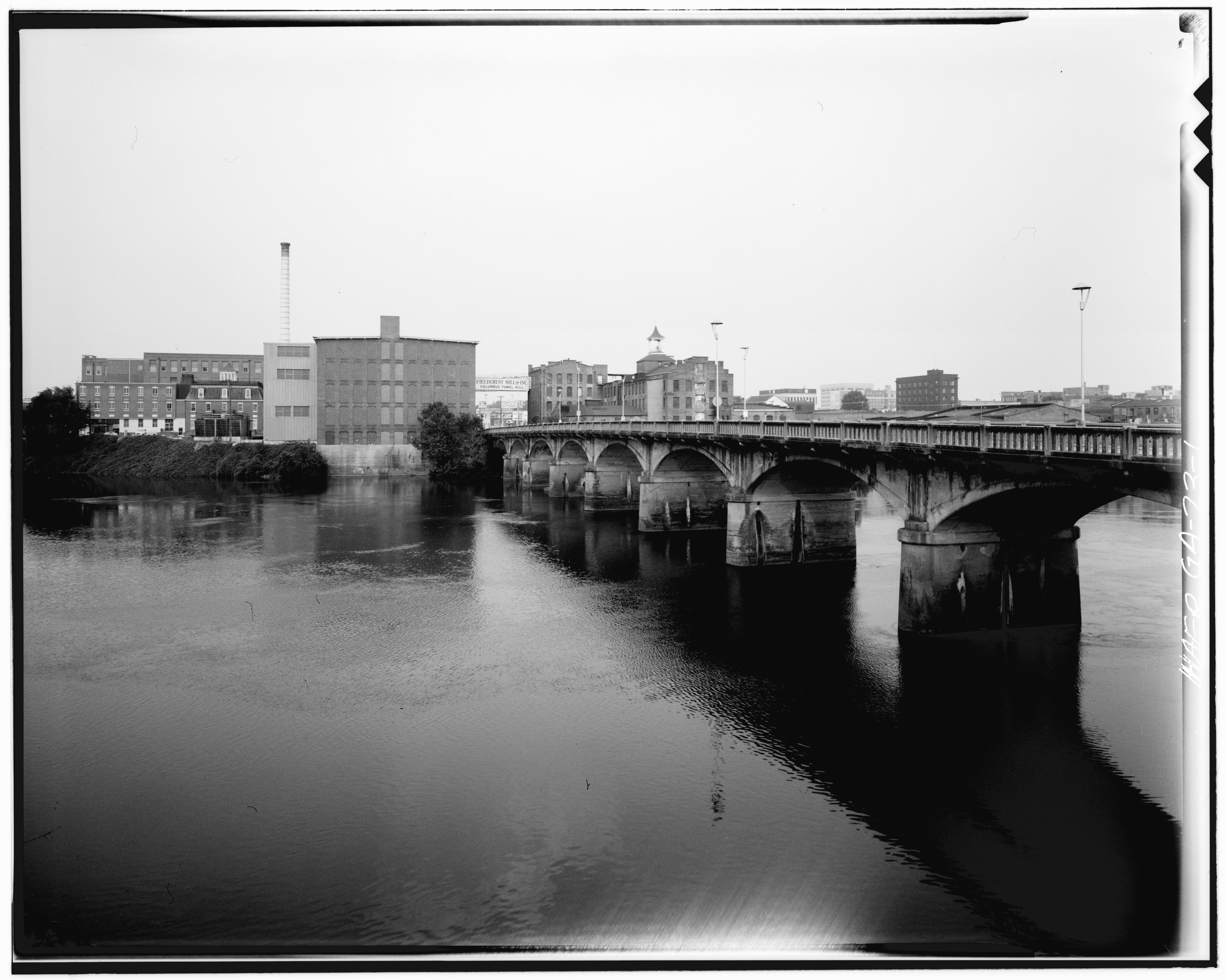
- Muscogee Mills, HABS photo, c. 1977

- Location within Georgia
- Location: sites along the Chattahoochee River between 8th St. N. and 38th St., Columbus, Georgia
- Coordinates: 32°28′53″N 84°59′30″W
- Built: 1844
- Architect: Multiple
- Architectural style: Italianate
- NRHP reference No.: 78000995

Significant dates
- Added to NRHP: June 2, 1978
- Designated NHLD: June 2, 1978

The Columbus Historic Riverfront Industrial District encompasses one of the most significant assemblages of 19th-century waterpowered mill technology in the American South. A National Historic Landmark District, it includes five historic industrial complexes with elements surviving as far back as the 1830s, located in four separate areas along the eastern bank of the Chattahoochee River in Columbus, Georgia. It was declared a National Historic Landmark in 1978.

== History ==
The city of Columbus is located at the fall line of the Chattahoochee River, a place where the river drops 125 feet (38 m) in a stretch of 2.5 miles (4.0 km). This location was recognized early in the American Industrial Revolution as a prime location for waterpowered factories, and the river was first dammed in 1828 (by a predecessor to the now-breached City Mills Dam), beginning what became one of the South's largest 19th-century industrial complexes. Embedded in five major industrial sites are the remains of industrial components used in the transfer of water power, and for the early generation and transfer of electrical power. Included in these are the Eagle and Phenix Mills, once the South's largest textile operation. Columbus was a powerhouse of manufacturing for the Confederacy during the American Civil War.

== Bibb Mill ==
The main building of the Bibb Mill complex is a long five-story brick building, set on a bluff overlooking the river. Although it is an early 20th-century building, one of the smaller buildings in the complex includes remnants of a pulley and rope drive system. This system was used until 1954, when its main drive shaft broke.

== City Mills ==
The City Mills complex was built as a grist mill. The oldest building dates to 1869, and was built by Horace King, a well-known regional African-American contractor. The original 1828 dam was replaced in 1908, and the main building was adapted for electrical power generation and distribution. It houses power generators installed in 1919, some of which operated into the 1960s.

== Muscogee Mills ==
The Muscogee Mills include the broadest diversity of architecture of the surviving complexes, including both ornate 19th-century industrial architecture, and utilitarian 20th-century buildings, as well as the city's original Carnegie library. Traces of the original 1844 millrace are also still evident.

== Eagle and Phenix Mills ==
The Eagle and Phenix Mills complex consists of three main mills, oriented perpendicular to the river, all which have origins in 19th-century construction, but have generally been altered or extended. This mill's original raceway and dam (now breached) also survive to some degree.

== Columbus Ironworks ==
This complex's oldest buildings date to the early 20th century, its older buildings destroyed by fire in 1902. The complex includes several generations of early electrical equipment, including a DC generator and three AC generators. A portion of the property has been converted into a convention and event center.

== See also ==
- List of National Historic Landmarks in Georgia (U.S. state)
- National Register of Historic Places listings in Muscogee County, Georgia
