= Caroline Park (Columbus, Georgia) =

Coordinates: 32.513°N 84.980°W

Caroline Park is a residential neighborhood in Columbus, Georgia. It is located north of the central business district of Downtown.
