= Green Island Hills (Columbus, Georgia) =

- Community
- Interactive map of Green Island Hills
- Coordinates: 32°32′6″N 85°0′26″W
- Elevation: 137.16 m (450.0 ft)
- Time zone: UTC-5 (EST)
  - Summer (DST): UTC-4 (EDT)
- Zip code: 31904

Green Island Hills is a residential neighborhood within the city of Columbus, Georgia, United States.

Homes in Green Island Hills range from Georgian, Tudor and Spanish Revival to Craftsman, with new modern homes popping up every month. With its central location, developers are building homes in the $400,000 plus range. The neighborhood consists of a mix of 1960s up to present day homes.

== Transportation ==
The main north–south street is River Road, which extends south towards the heart of the city via Veterans Parkway at River Road's southern terminus. River Road is a street that defines a border between Green Island Hills and other neighborhoods within the city. Major east–west streets include Cascade Road and Mountainbrook Drive. Besides River Road, other arterial roads include Standing Boy Road and Winding Ridge Road. METRA Transit System also has two stops in Green Island Hills.
