= Benning Park (Columbus, Georgia) =

- Neighborhood
- Location within Georgia
- Coordinates: 32°26′0.17″N 84°56′26.21″W
- Country: USA
- State: Georgia
- City: Columbus

Benning Park is a neighborhood in Columbus, Georgia, near Fort Moore.
