= Oakland Park (Columbus, Georgia) =

Coordinates: 32°24′50″N 84°57′20″W

- Neighborhood
- Interactive map of Oakland Park

Area
  - Total: 2.1 sq mi (5.4 km^{2})

Population (2007)
  - Total: 6,663
  - Density: 3,176/sq mi (1,226.3/km^{2})
- Time zone: UTC-5 (EST)
  - Summer (DST): UTC-4 (EDT)
- Zip code: 31903

Oakland Park is a neighborhood located in southwest Columbus, Georgia, near Fort Benning.
