= Columbus Park Crossing =

- Columbus Park Crossing
- Location: Columbus, Georgia, United States
- Coordinates: 32°32′40″N 84°56′37″W
- Opened: 2002
- Num. of stores: 50+
- Num. of anchor tenants: 11
- Floors: 1 (2 in former Sears)
- Website: columbusparkcrossing.com

Columbus Park Crossing is an outdoor center featuring shopping and dining on the north side of Columbus, Georgia, United States. Columbus Park Crossing features a variety of national retailers, restaurants, and specialty local stories, as well as a movie theatre.

Planning for the shopping center began in 2000, and required the Columbus City Council to rezone the land, which was then restricted to residential use, to allow commercial development. Construction began in 2001, and retailers began opening stores in 2002.
