= Bibb City, Georgia =

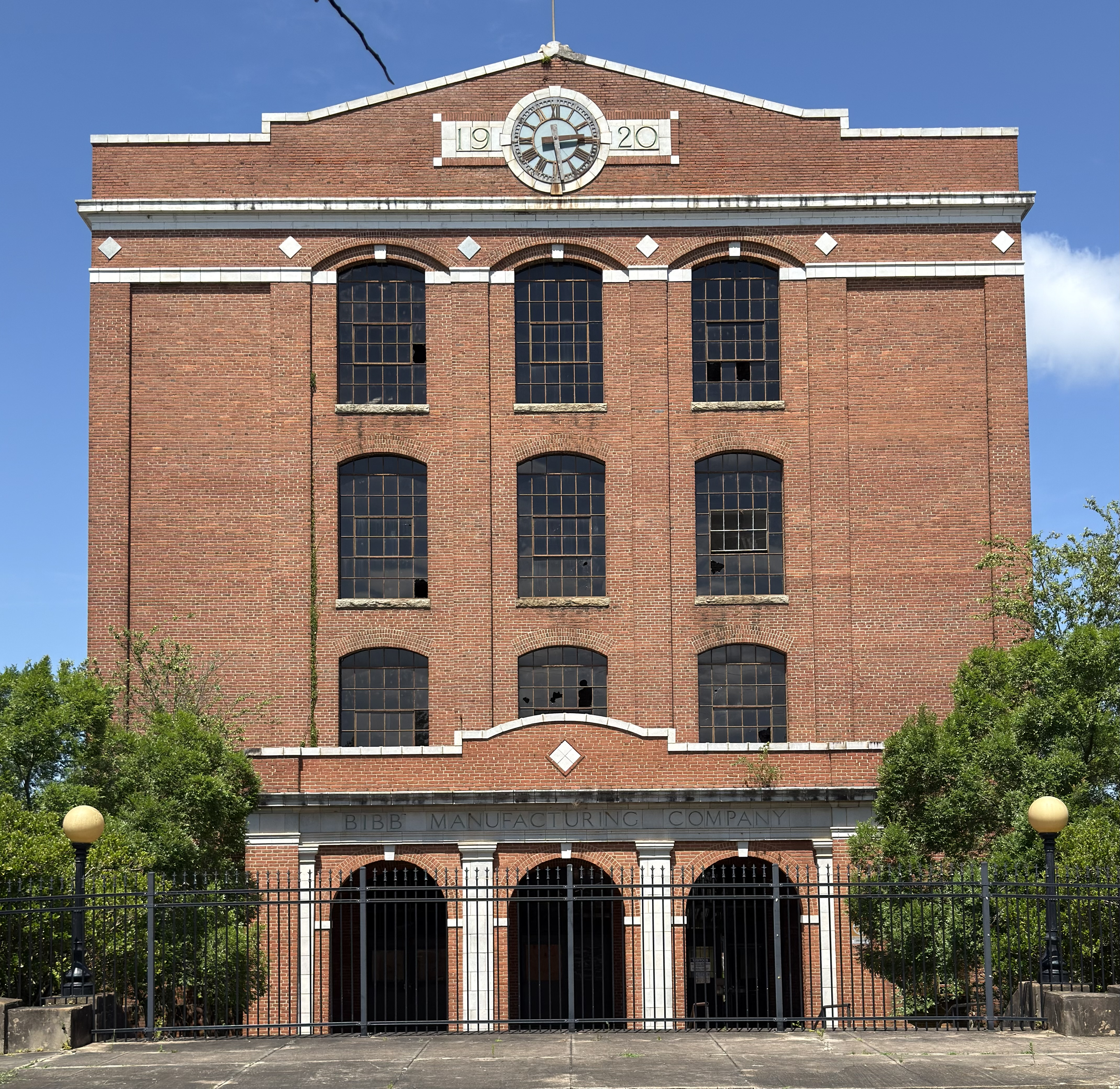
- The remains of the old mill.

- Location of Bibb City, Georgia
- Coordinates: 32°30′5″N 84°59′31″W
- Country: United States
- State: Georgia
- County: Muscogee

Area
  - Total: 0.15 sq mi (0.4 km^{2})
  - Land: 0.15 sq mi (0.4 km^{2})
  - Water: 0 sq mi (0.0 km^{2})
- Elevation: 338 ft (103 m)

Population (2007)
  - Total: 648
  - Density: 3,065/sq mi (1,183.4/km^{2})
- Time zone: UTC-5 (Eastern (EST))
  - Summer (DST): UTC-4 (EDT)
- FIPS code: 13-07864
- GNIS feature ID: 0331158

- Bibb City Historic District
- U.S. National Register of Historic Places
- U.S. Historic district
- Location within Georgia Location within the United States
- Location: Roughly bounded by Chattahoochee River, Woodland Cir., 2nd Ave. and 35th St., Bibb City, Georgia
- Area: 48 acres (19 ha)
- Built: 1900
- Architect: Blair, Algernon; et al.
- Architectural style: Classical Revival, Bungalow/craftsman
- NRHP reference No.: 10000037
- Added to NRHP: February 24, 2010

Bibb City was a city in west-central Georgia, United States. It had been the company town of the Bibb Manufacturing Company in Muscogee County, and had a population of 510 in its last official U.S. census (2000). The entire city area, consisting of historic Columbus Mill and the associated mill village owned by the company, is now part of the consolidated city-county of Columbus. It is listed in the National Register of Historic Places as Bibb City Historic District.

Bibb City was incorporated in 1909 as a city surrounding—and managed by—the Bibb Manufacturing Company, which operated a textile mill there. The mill closed in 1998. The city dissolved its charter two years later, on December 7, 2000, because it lacked the necessary funding to continue city operations. Bibb City was then formally annexed by Columbus. In September 2006, Bibb City was nominated as a historic district for the National Register of Historic Places by Georgia's State Historic Preservation Officer. On February 14, 2010, the national designation was approved for the Bibb City Historic District, and it was listed in the NRHP.

== Geography ==
Bibb City is located at 32°30′5″N 84°59′31″W (32.501441, -84.991956).

According to the United States Census Bureau, the town has a total area of 0.2 square miles (0.4 km^{2}), all land.

== Demographics ==
Historical population
Census	Pop.	Note	%±
1910	463		—
1920	1,090		135.4%
1930	1,707		56.6%
1940	1,631		−4.5%
1950	1,452		−11.0%
1960	1,213		−16.5%
1970	812		−33.1%
1980	667		−17.9%
1990	597		−10.5%
2000	510		−14.6%
U.S. Decennial Census

In the census of 2000, Bibb City's final recorded census, there were 510 people, 220 households, and 117 families residing in the town. The population density was 3,064.9 inhabitants per square mile (1,183.4/km^{2}). There were 242 housing units at an average density of 1,454.3 per square mile (561.5/km^{2}). The racial makeup of the town was 92.16% White, 4.31% African American, 0.98% Native American, 0.20% Asian, 0.20% Pacific Islander, 0.20% from other races, and 1.96% from two or more races. Hispanic or Latino of any race were 0.78% of the population.

There were 220 households, out of which 24.5% had children under the age of 18 living with them, 32.3% were married couples living together, 15.9% had a female householder with no husband present, and 46.4% were non-families. 39.5% of all households were made up of individuals, and 19.5% had someone living alone who was 65 years of age or older. The average household size was 2.32 and the average family size was 3.18.

In the town the population was spread out, with 24.1% under the age of 18, 12.0% from 18 to 24, 25.9% from 25 to 44, 21.4% from 45 to 64, and 16.7% who were 65 years of age or older. The median age was 36 years. For every 100 females, there were 90.3 males. For every 100 females age 18 and over, there were 90.6 males.

The median income for a household in the town was $24,107, and the median income for a family was $23,125. Males had a median income of $27,083 versus $21,071 for females. The per capita income for the town was $13,068. About 27.9% of families and 32.6% of the population were below the poverty line, including 57.1% of those under age 18 and 19.4% of those age 65 or over.

== Bibb Manufacturing's Columbus Mill ==
The centerpiece of Bibb City was Bibb Manufacturing Company's 750,000 sq ft (70,000 m^{2}) Columbus Mill. At its peak in the 1940s, the mill employed 2,500 workers and was the largest cotton mill in the United States. In that segregated era, most of the textile workers were white.

The mill closed in 1998 but was left standing. Shortly after midnight on October 30, 2008, the 750,000 sq ft (70,000 m^{2}) Columbus Mill was destroyed by a massive fire. After a four-day joint investigation by the ATF and the Columbus Department of Fire and Emergency Medical Services, the cause of the blaze remained undetermined.

== Climate ==
The climate in this area is characterized by relatively high temperatures and evenly distributed precipitation throughout the year. According to the Köppen Climate Classification system, Bibb City has a humid subtropical climate, abbreviated "Cfa" on climate maps.

Climate data for Bibb City, Georgia
Month	Jan	Feb	Mar	Apr	May	Jun	Jul	Aug	Sep	Oct	Nov	Dec	Year
Mean daily maximum °C (°F)	14 (57)	16 (60)	20 (68)	25 (77)	28 (82)	32 (89)	33 (91)	32 (89)	30 (86)	25 (77)	19 (66)	15 (59)	24 (75)
Mean daily minimum °C (°F)	2 (35)	3 (37)	7 (44)	10 (50)	15 (59)	20 (68)	22 (71)	21 (69)	18 (64)	12 (53)	6 (42)	3 (37)	11 (51)
Average precipitation mm (inches)	110 (4.3)	120 (4.6)	140 (5.7)	110 (4.3)	100 (4)	97 (3.8)	140 (5.5)	99 (3.9)	81 (3.2)	51 (2)	91 (3.6)	120 (4.7)	1,260 (49.6)
Source: Weatherbase

== Education ==
Its school district is the Muscogee County School District.
