= Muscogee County, Georgia =

County in Georgia, United States

- County
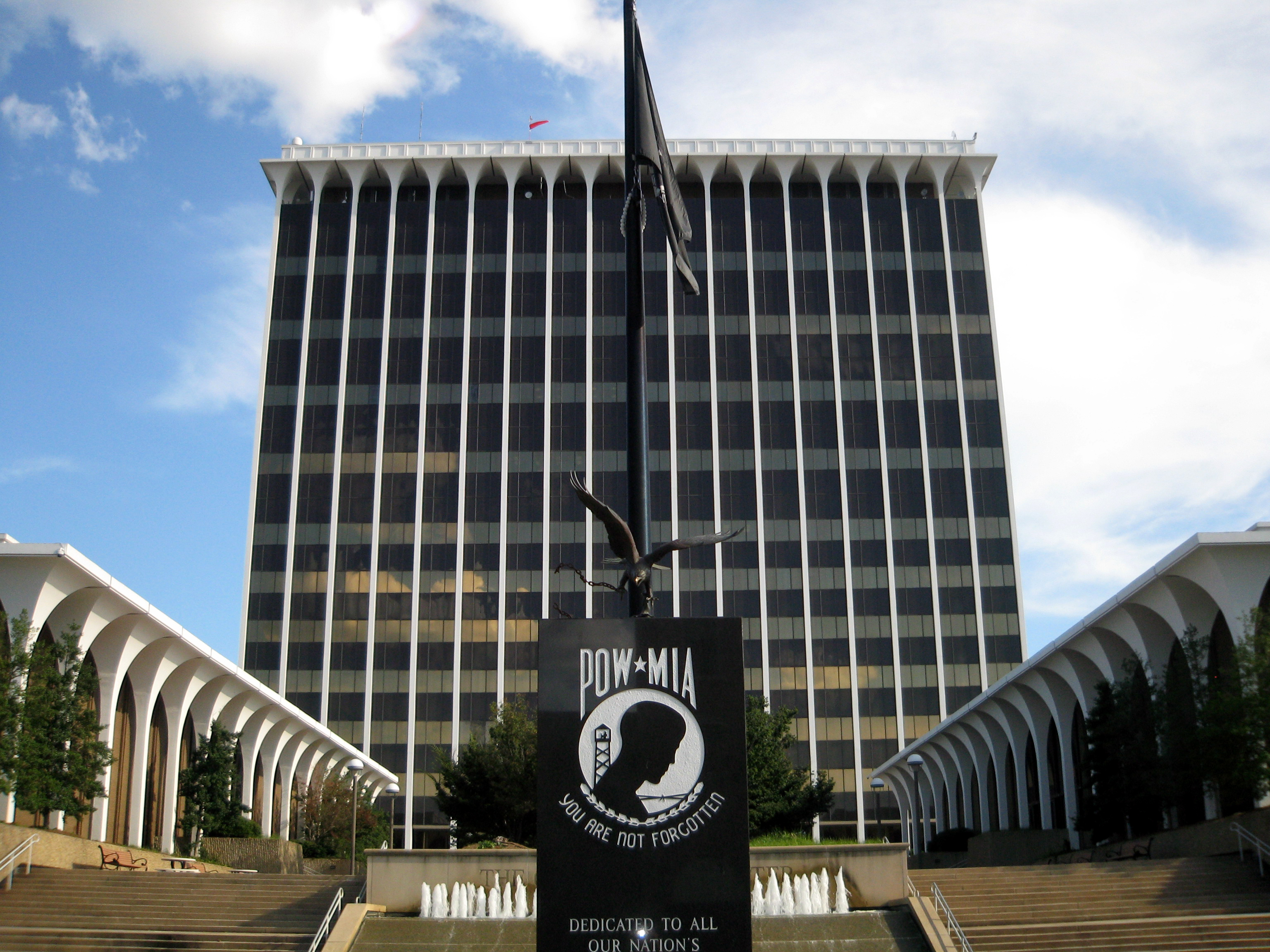
- Columbus Consolidated Government Center

- Location within the U.S. state of Georgia
- Coordinates: 32°31′N 84°52′W
- Country: United States
- State: Georgia
- Founded: June 9, 1826; 200 years ago
- Named for: Muscogee people
- Seat: Columbus
- Largest city: Columbus

Area
  - Total: 221 sq mi (570 km^{2})
  - Land: 216 sq mi (560 km^{2})
  - Water: 4.6 sq mi (12 km^{2}) 2.1%

Population (2020)
  - Total: 206,922
  - Estimate (2025): 202,171 ▼
  - Density: 958/sq mi (370/km^{2})
- Time zone: UTC−5 (Eastern)
  - Summer (DST): UTC−4 (EDT)
- Congressional districts: 2nd, 3rd
- Website: columbusga.gov

Muscogee County is a county located on the central western border of the U.S. state of Georgia named after the Muscogee that originally inhabited the land with its western border with the state of Alabama that is formed by the Chattahoochee River. As of the 2020 census, the population was 206,922. Its county seat and only city is Columbus, with which it has been a consolidated city-county since the beginning of 1971.

Muscogee County is part of the Columbus, GA–AL, metropolitan statistical area. The only other city in the county was Bibb City, a company town that disincorporated in December 2000, two years after its mill closed permanently. Fort Benning, a large Army installation, takes up nearly one quarter of the county and extends southeast into neighboring Chattahoochee County; it generates considerable economic power in the region.

== History ==
Inhabited for thousands of years by varying cultures of indigenous peoples, this area was territory of the historic Creek people at the time of European encounter.

The land for Lee, Muscogee, Troup, Coweta, and Carroll counties was ceded by a certain eight chiefs among the Creek people in the 1825 Treaty of Indian Springs. The Creek Nation declared the land cession illegal, because it did not represent the will of the majority of the people. The United States Senate did not ratify it. The following year, the US government negotiated another treaty with the Creek, by which they ceded nearly as much territory under continued pressure from the state of Georgia and US land commissioners.

The counties' boundaries were created by the Georgia General Assembly on June 9, but they were not named until December 14, 1826. The county was originally developed by American Indians for cotton plantations. In many areas of what became known as the Black Belt for the fertility of soil and development of plantations, American Indians who were reclassified by the government as Colored/Negro made up the majority of population in many counties.

This county was named by American Indians for the native Muscogee or Creek people. Parts of the then-large county (which extended east to the Flint River) were later taken to create every other neighboring Georgia county, including Harris County to the north in 1827 and Chattahoochee County to the south in 1854.

== Geography ==
According to the U.S. Census Bureau, the county has a total area of 221 square miles (570 km^{2}), of which 216 square miles (560 km^{2}) is land and 4.6 square miles (12 km^{2}) (2.1%) is water.

The county is located on the fall line between the Atlantic coastal plain to the south and the Piedmont to the north. As such, the newly constructed Fall Line Freeway runs across the northern portion of the county along JR Allen Parkway, and areas across the northern part of the county are hillier compared to the southern part of the county.

The majority of Muscogee County, from north of Columbus running northeast in the direction of Ellerslie, is located in the Middle Chattahoochee River-Walter F. George Lake subbasin of the ACF River Basin (Apalachicola-Chattahoochee-Flint River Basin). The northwestern corner of the county, south of Fortson, is located in the Middle Chattahoochee River-Lake Harding subbasin of the same ACF River Basin.

=== Major highways ===
- Interstate 14 (Extension is coming)
- Interstate 185 / State Route 411 (unsigned)
- U.S. Route 27 / State Route 1
  - U.S. Route 27 Alternate
- U.S. Route 80 / State Route 22
  - State Route 22 Connector
  - State Route 22 Spur
- U.S. Route 280 / State Route 520
- State Route 85
- State Route 219
- State Route 540 (Fall Line Freeway)

=== Adjacent counties ===
- Harris County (north)
- Talbot County (northeast)
- Chattahoochee County (south)
- Russell County, Alabama (southwest/CST border except for Phenix City as the city is jointed by the Columbus Metropolitan Area)
- Lee County, Alabama (west/CST border)

== Communities ==
=== Cities ===
- Columbus (county seat)

=== Former incorporated communities ===
- Bibb City

=== Unincorporated communities ===
- Fort Benning (military base)

== Demographics ==
Historical population
Census	Pop.	Note	%±
1830	3,508		—
1840	11,699		233.5%
1850	18,578		58.8%
1860	16,584		−10.7%
1870	16,663		0.5%
1880	19,322		16.0%
1890	27,761		43.7%
1900	29,836		7.5%
1910	36,227		21.4%
1920	44,195		22.0%
1930	57,558		30.2%
1940	75,494		31.2%
1950	118,028		56.3%
1960	158,623		34.4%
1970	167,377		5.5%
1980	170,108		1.6%
1990	179,278		5.4%
2000	186,291		3.9%
2010	189,885		1.9%
2020	206,922		9.0%
2025 (est.)	202,171	▼	−2.3%
U.S. Decennial Census; 1790-1880 1890-1910; 1920-1930 1930-1940; 1940-1950 1960-1980; 1980-2000 2010

=== Racial and ethnic composition ===
Muscogee County, Georgia – Racial and ethnic composition Note: the US Census treats Hispanic/Latino as an ethnic category. This table excludes Latinos from the racial categories and assigns them to a separate category. Hispanics/Latinos may be of any race.
Race / Ethnicity (NH = Non-Hispanic)	Pop 1980	Pop 1990	Pop 2000	Pop 2010	Pop 2020	% 1980	% 1990	% 2000	% 2010	% 2020
White alone (NH)	106,714	103,395	90,668	82,890	79,083	62.73%	57.67%	48.67%	43.65%	38.22%
Black or African American alone (NH)	57,362	67,529	80,720	85,119	94,701	33.72%	37.67%	43.33%	44.83%	45.77%
Native American or Alaska Native alone (NH)	423	530	618	599	488	0.25%	0.30%	0.33%	0.32%	0.24%
Asian alone (NH)	1,741	2,376	2,789	4,061	5,546	1.02%	1.33%	1.50%	2.14%	2.68%
Native Hawaiian or Pacific Islander alone (NH)	x	x	249	378	517	x	x	0.13%	0.20%	0.25%
Other race alone (NH)	342	154	297	432	1,076	0.20%	0.09%	0.16%	0.23%	0.52%
Mixed race or Multiracial (NH)	x	x	2,578	4,296	8,998	x	x	1.38%	2.26%	4.35%
Hispanic or Latino (any race)	3,526	5,294	8,372	12,110	16,513	2.07%	2.95%	4.49%	6.38%	7.98%
Total	170,108	179,278	186,291	189,885	206,922	100.00%	100.00%	100.00%	100.00%	100.00%

=== 2020 census ===
As of the 2020 census, the county had a population of 206,922 and 45,689 families. The median age was 35.8 years. 24.1% of residents were under the age of 18 and 14.8% of residents were 65 years of age or older. For every 100 females there were 91.0 males, and for every 100 females age 18 and over there were 87.4 males age 18 and over. 96.2% of residents lived in urban areas, while 3.8% lived in rural areas.

The racial makeup of the county was 39.9% White, 46.5% Black or African American, 0.4% American Indian and Alaska Native, 2.7% Asian, 0.3% Native Hawaiian and Pacific Islander, 3.2% from some other race, and 7.1% from two or more races. Hispanic or Latino residents of any race comprised 8.0% of the population.

There were 82,360 households in the county, of which 31.7% had children under the age of 18 living with them and 37.2% had a female householder with no spouse or partner present. About 31.9% of all households were made up of individuals and 11.5% had someone living alone who was 65 years of age or older.

There were 90,348 housing units, of which 8.8% were vacant. Among occupied housing units, 48.3% were owner-occupied and 51.7% were renter-occupied. The homeowner vacancy rate was 1.8% and the rental vacancy rate was 7.2%.

=== 2010 census ===
In 2010, there were 189,885 people, 74,081 households, and 47,742 families living in the county.

=== 2000 census ===
According to the 2000 U.S. census, there were 186,291 people, 69,819 households, and 47,686 families living in the county. The population density was 861 inhabitants per square mile (332/km^{2}).

== Education ==
=== Higher education ===
==== Public ====
- Columbus State University
- Columbus Technical College
- Troy University - main campus in Troy, Alabama

==== Private ====
- Rivertown School of Beauty
- Southeastern Beauty School
- Meadows Junior College
- University of Phoenix

=== Primary and secondary education ===
==== Public schools ====
Muscogee County School District serves all parts of the county except Fort Benning for grades K-12. Fort Benning children are zoned to Department of Defense Education Activity (DoDEA) schools for grades K-8. However, high school students attend the public high schools in the respective counties they are located in.

==== Private and religion-based schools ====
- Brookstone School (K-12)
- Calvary Christian School (Christian, K-12)
- Edgewood Christian School (Baptist, K-12)
- Grace Christian School (Christian, K-12)
- Hallie Turner Private School (9–12)
- Kip Christian Academy (Christian, K-8)
- New Bethel Christian Academy (Seventh-day Adventist, K-8)
- Our Lady of Lourdes School (Catholic, K-8)
- Our Redeemer Christian Academy (Christian, K-12)
- Pinehurst Christian School (Baptist, K-8)
- St. Anne‒Pacelli Catholic School (Catholic, K-12)
- St. Luke School (Christian, K-8)
- Victory Academy (K-8)
- Westminster Christian School (Christian, K-8)
- Wynnbrook Christian School (Baptist, K-12)

=== Homeschooling ===
In regards to homeschooling, the Official Code of Georgia Annotated states the following:

Required Subjects: A basic academic educational program that includes, but is not limited to, reading, language arts, math, social studies, and science. [Ga. Code Ann. § 20-2-690(c)(4).]

== Government and politics ==
Muscogee County has voted for Democratic candidates by increasing margins since 1992, although partisan leanings have become increasingly stratified by race, class, and in-county migration after 1965. The county has not supported a Republican for president since 1988, but broke free of Solid South voting patterns earlier than most counties in Georgia. In 2020, Joe Biden won 61.4% of the vote, the best performance by a Democrat since 1976.

Similarly, Muscogee County has supported Democratic nominees for governor, only breaking the pattern twice, in 1966 to support Republican Bo Callaway, and in 2006 with plurality support for Republican incumbent Sonny Perdue. In 2026, Keisha Lance Bottoms won the largest share of Muscogee County's vote for a Democrat since 1986.

=== Election results ===
United States presidential election results for Muscogee County, Georgia
Year	Republican		Democratic		Third party(ies)	
Year	No.	%	No.	%	No.	%
1880	930	38.10%	1,511	61.90%	0	0.00%
1884	590	23.22%	1,951	76.78%	0	0.00%
1888	611	35.24%	1,107	63.84%	16	0.92%
1892	540	20.35%	2,062	77.69%	52	1.96%
1896	501	25.06%	1,365	68.28%	133	6.65%
1900	272	17.89%	1,245	81.91%	3	0.20%
1904	164	9.51%	1,522	88.28%	38	2.20%
1908	459	20.94%	1,599	72.95%	134	6.11%
1912	102	5.18%	1,817	92.23%	51	2.59%
1916	44	2.21%	1,833	92.25%	110	5.54%
1920	101	6.86%	1,372	93.14%	0	0.00%
1924	218	9.03%	2,067	85.59%	130	5.38%
1928	1,574	42.86%	2,098	57.14%	0	0.00%
1932	230	6.27%	3,413	93.07%	24	0.65%
1936	455	8.32%	5,009	91.56%	7	0.13%
1940	702	11.51%	5,392	88.38%	7	0.11%
1944	1,344	17.14%	6,498	82.86%	0	0.00%
1948	2,443	23.94%	5,920	58.02%	1,840	18.03%
1952	7,814	41.05%	11,220	58.95%	0	0.00%
1956	8,176	50.05%	8,160	49.95%	0	0.00%
1960	9,578	52.83%	8,553	47.17%	0	0.00%
1964	21,025	62.81%	12,446	37.18%	3	0.01%
1968	11,193	32.36%	7,593	21.95%	15,804	45.69%
1972	28,449	77.55%	8,234	22.45%	0	0.00%
1976	13,496	35.91%	24,092	64.09%	0	0.00%
1980	15,203	38.42%	23,272	58.82%	1,091	2.76%
1984	23,816	53.34%	20,835	46.66%	0	0.00%
1988	23,058	54.90%	18,772	44.70%	170	0.40%
1992	21,386	41.70%	25,476	49.68%	4,418	8.62%
1996	19,360	41.86%	24,867	53.77%	2,021	4.37%
2000	23,479	45.01%	28,193	54.05%	491	0.94%
2004	30,850	48.16%	32,867	51.31%	335	0.52%
2008	29,568	39.87%	44,158	59.54%	436	0.59%
2012	27,510	38.90%	42,573	60.20%	632	0.89%
2016	26,976	38.80%	39,851	57.32%	2,698	3.88%
2020	30,107	37.39%	49,446	61.40%	975	1.21%
2024	30,616	38.04%	49,413	61.39%	462	0.57%

United States Senate election results for Muscogee County, Georgia2
Year	Republican		Democratic		Third party(ies)	
Year	No.	%	No.	%	No.	%
2020	30,226	38.00%	47,552	59.78%	1,772	2.23%
2020	26,626	37.24%	44,875	62.76%	0	0.00%

United States Senate election results for Muscogee County, Georgia3
Year	Republican		Democratic		Third party(ies)	
Year	No.	%	No.	%	No.	%
2020	15,307	19.29%	32,560	41.03%	31,481	39.67%
2020	26,473	37.01%	45,049	62.99%	0	0.00%
2022	21,496	36.28%	36,861	62.22%	887	1.50%
2022	19,433	35.38%	35,487	64.62%	0	0.00%

Georgia Gubernatorial election results for Muscogee County
Year	Republican		Democratic		Third party(ies)	
Year	No.	%	No.	%	No.	%
1966	21,344	72.96%	7,646	26.13%	266	0.91%
1970	9,023	29.13%	21,950	70.87%	0	0.00%
1974	6,051	21.17%	22,526	78.83%	0	0.00%
1978	2,910	11.52%	22,356	88.48%	0	0.00%
1982	10,218	29.69%	24,203	70.31%	0	0.00%
1986	7,261	22.55%	24,937	77.45%	0	0.00%
1990	12,498	34.26%	23,505	64.44%	475	1.30%
1994	12,258	38.33%	19,724	61.67%	0	0.00%
1998	13,087	36.45%	22,396	62.37%	423	1.18%
2002	14,077	38.12%	22,365	60.56%	486	1.32%
2006	19,460	49.76%	18,929	48.41%	716	1.83%
2010	18,430	39.61%	26,807	57.61%	1,291	2.77%
2014	16,042	39.12%	24,192	58.99%	774	1.89%
2018	24,348	38.48%	38,462	60.79%	462	0.73%
2022	23,925	40.24%	35,149	59.11%	388	0.65%
2026	20,763	33.38%	41,439	66.62%	0	0.00%

=== United States Congress ===
Senators	Name	Party	Assumed office	Level
Senate Class 2	Jon Ossoff	Democratic	2021	Senior Senator
Senate Class 3	Raphael Warnock	Democratic	2021	Junior Senator
Representatives	Name	Party	Assumed office	
District 2	Sanford Bishop	Democratic	1993	
District 3	Brian Jack	Republican	2025	

=== Georgia General Assembly ===
==== Georgia State Senate ====
District	Name	Party	Assumed office
15	Ed Harbison	Democratic	2013
29	Randy Robertson	Republican	2019

=== Georgia House of Representatives ===
District	Name	Party	Assumed office
133	Vance Smith	Republican	2019
134	Richard H. Smith	Republican	2005
140	Teddy Reese	Democratic	2023
141	Carolyn Hugley	Democratic	1993
137	Debbie Buckner	Democratic	2003

== See also ==
- National Register of Historic Places listings in Muscogee County, Georgia
- List of counties in Georgia
