= Columbus, Georgia =

City in Georgia, United States

- Consolidated city-county
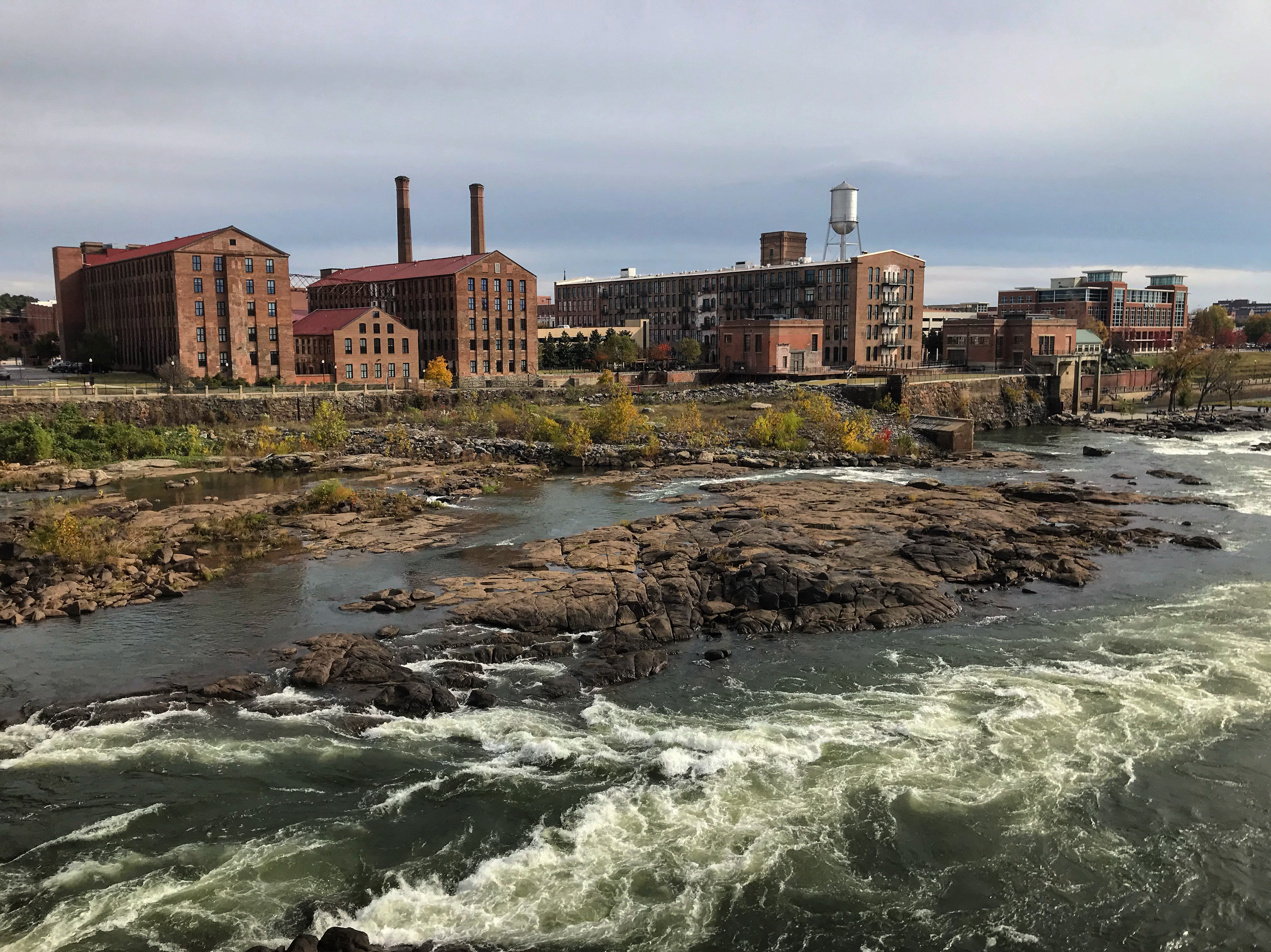
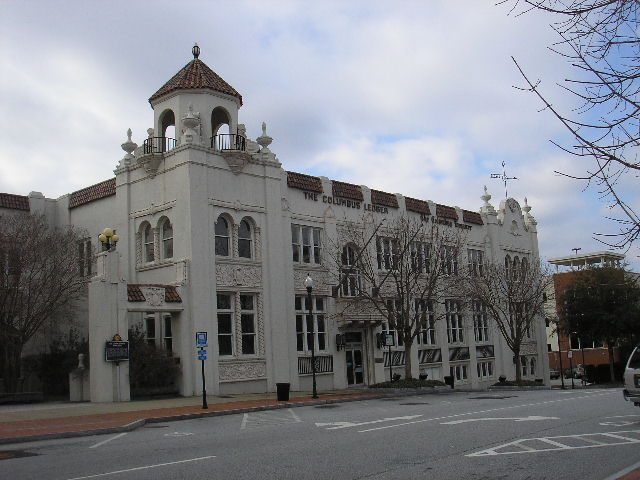
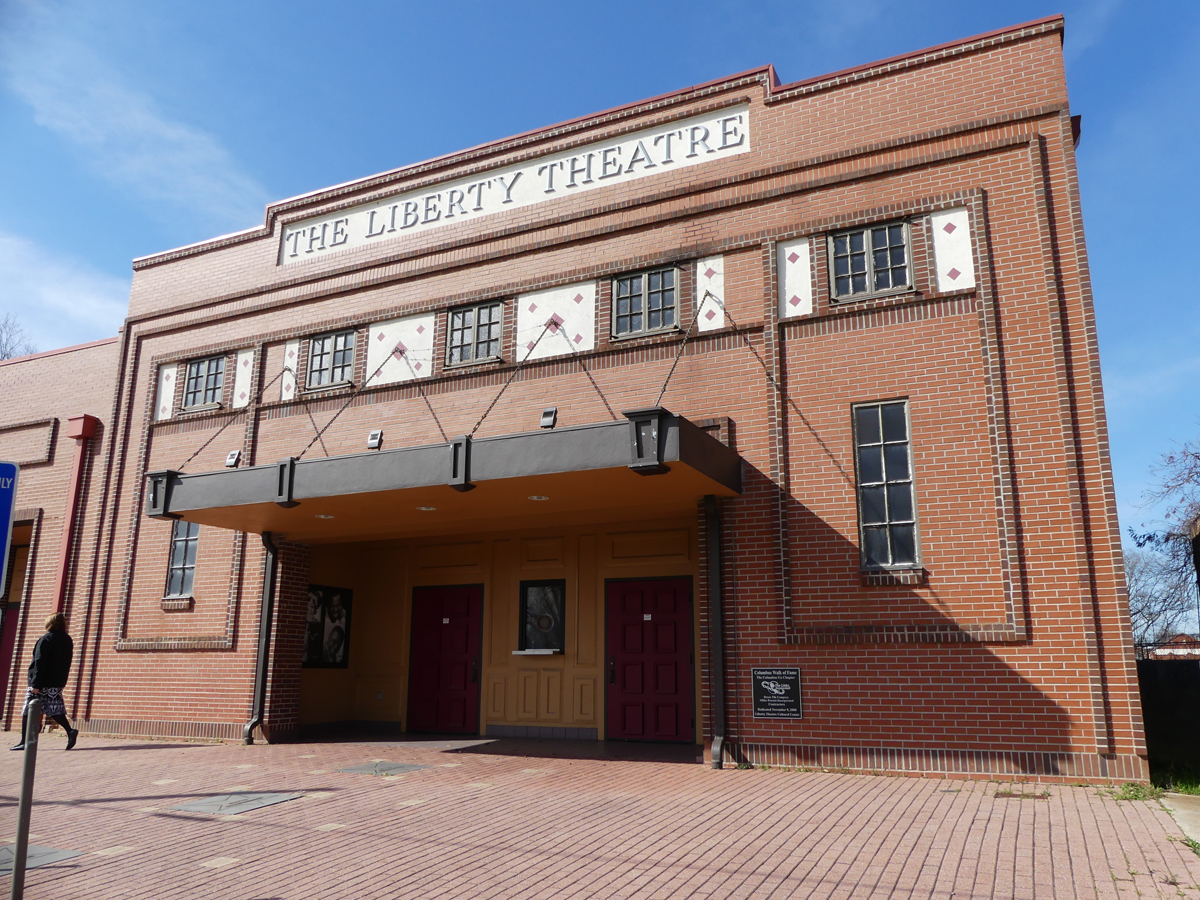
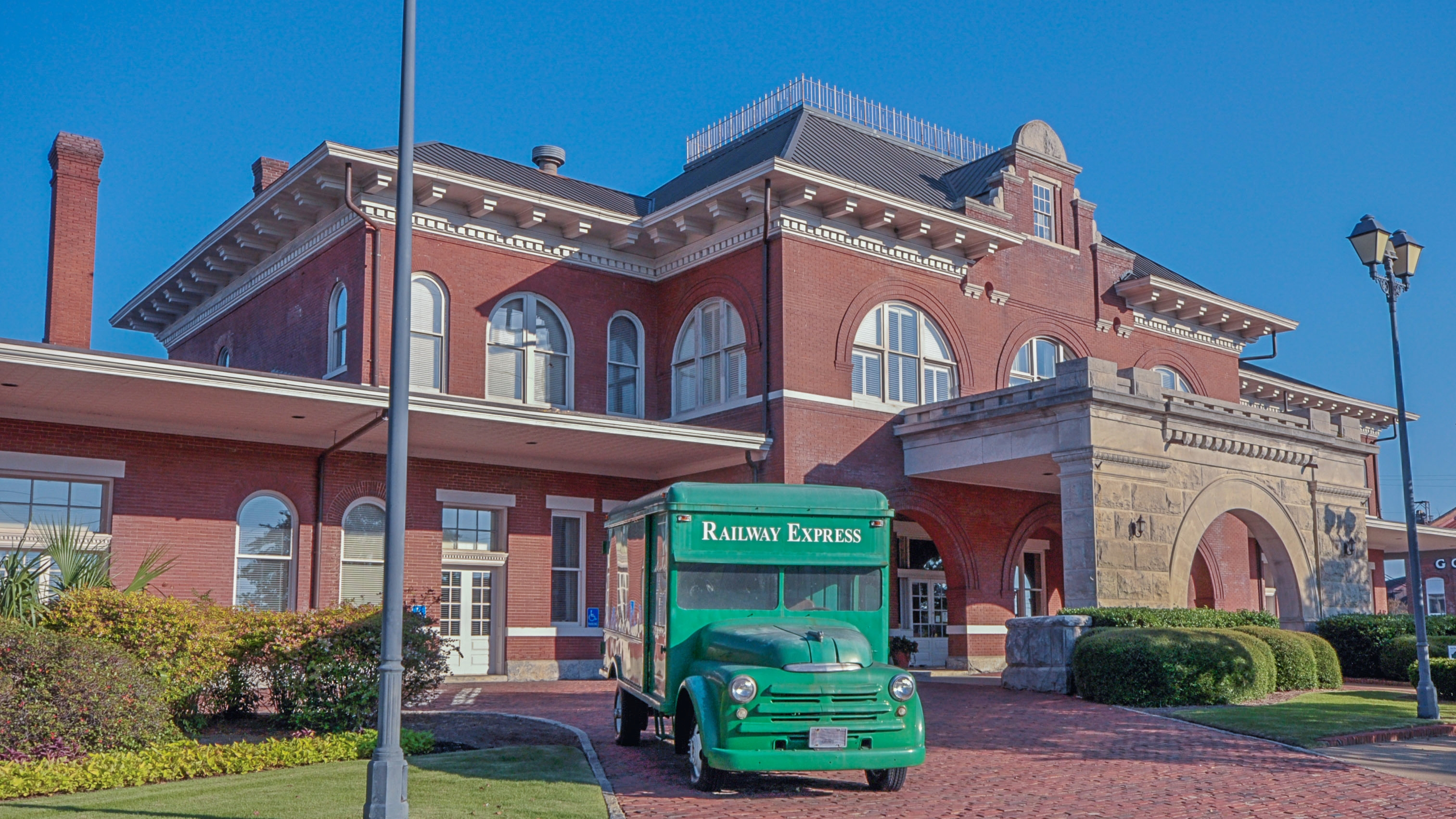
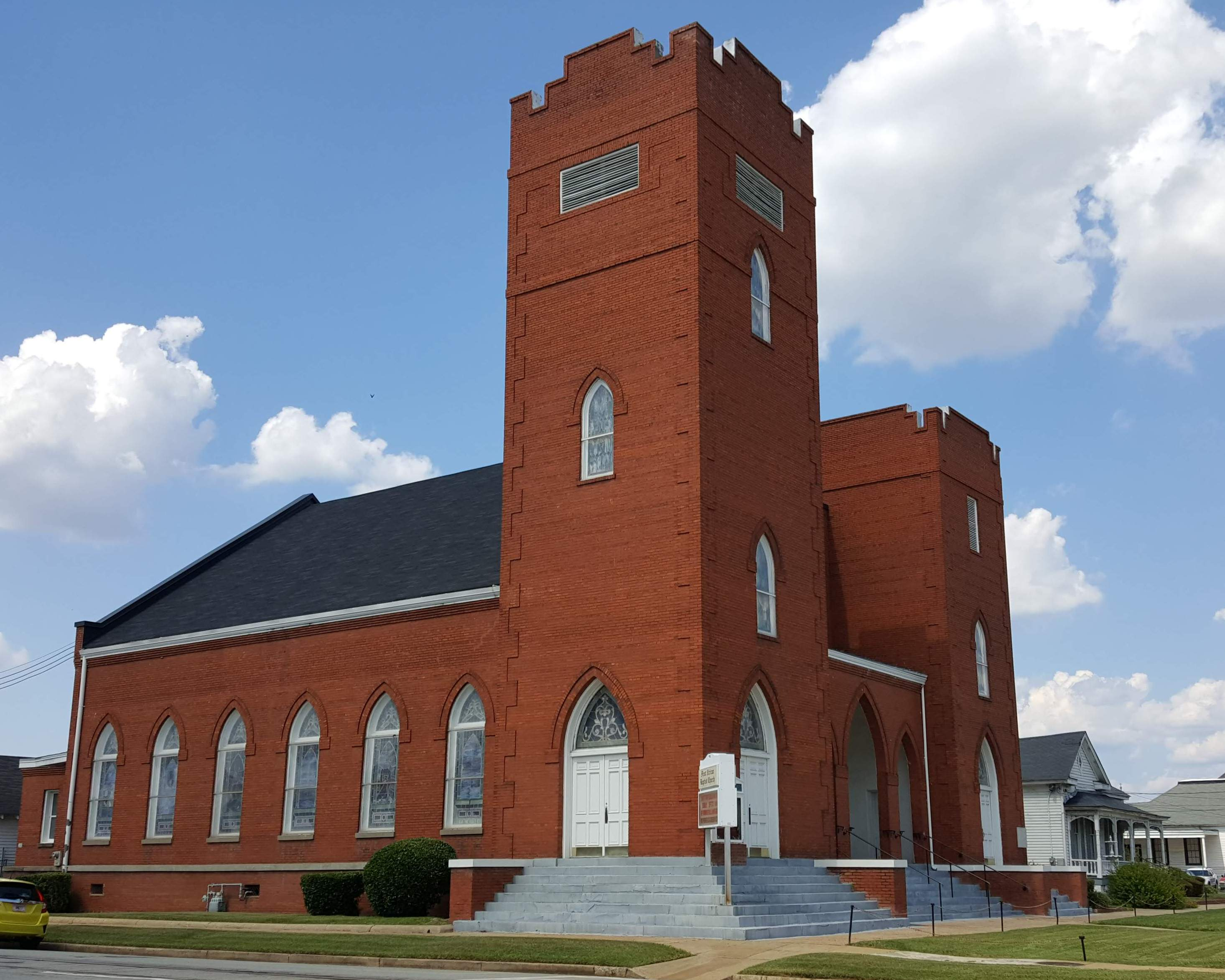
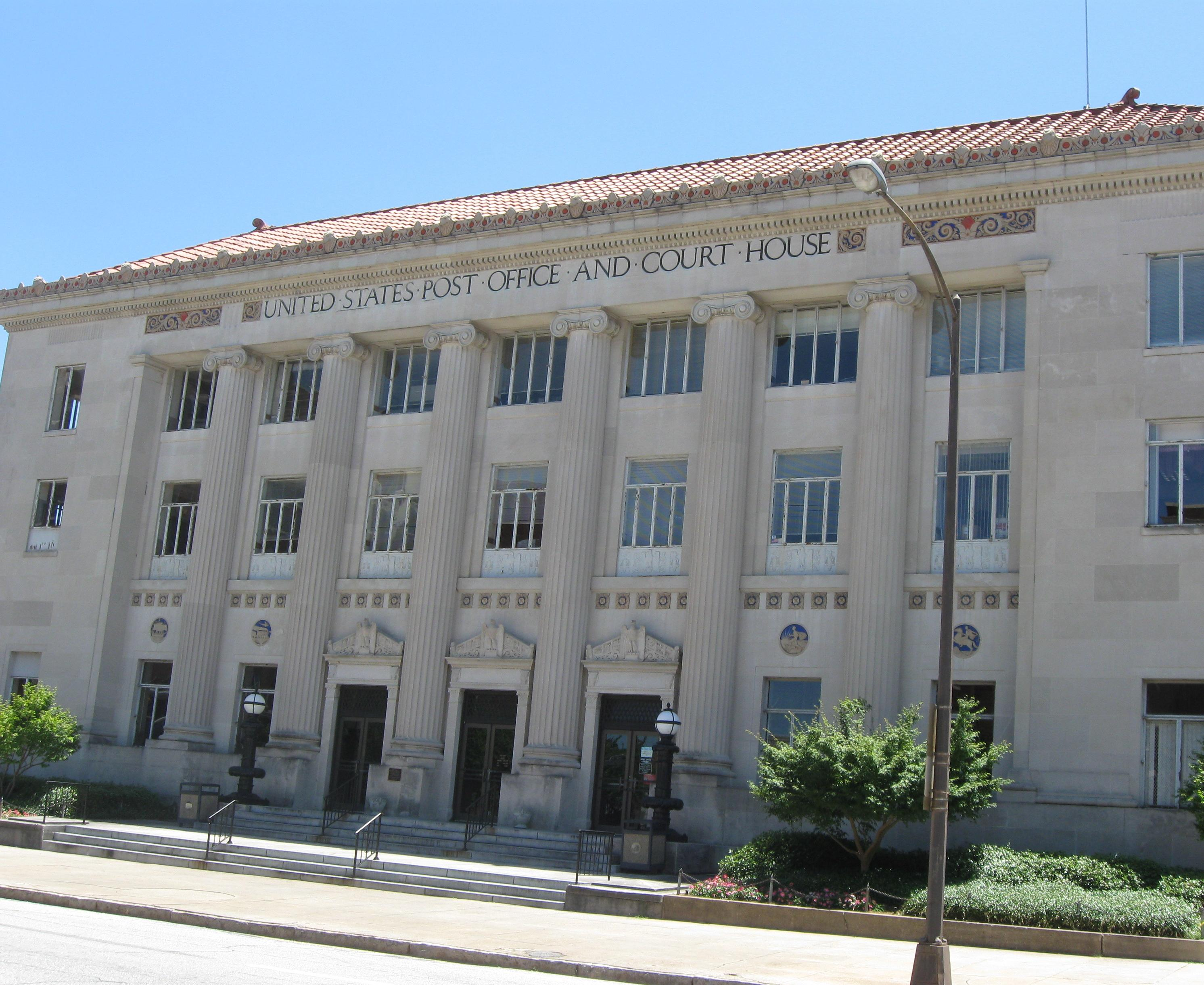
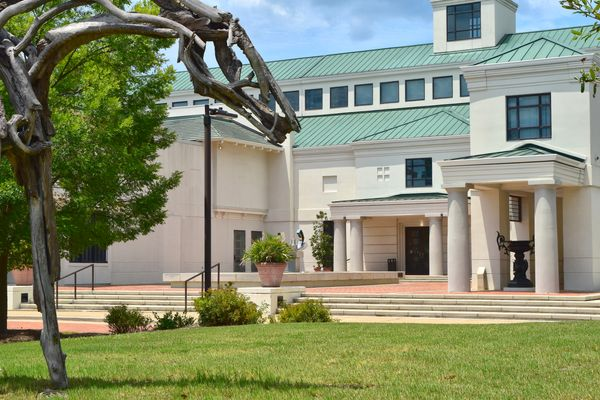
- Downtown skyline on the banks of the Chattahoochee River Ledger-Enquirer Building The Liberty Theatre Central of Georgia Railroad Terminal First African Baptist Church Columbus Post Office and Courthouse Columbus Museum

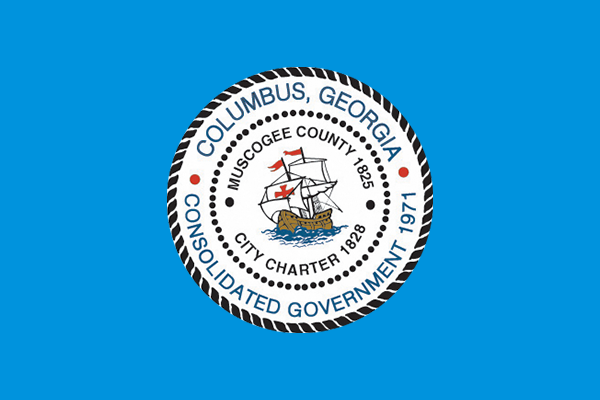
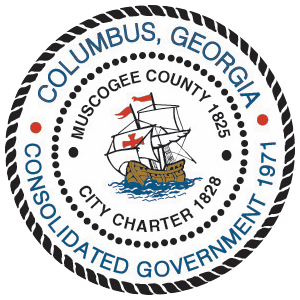
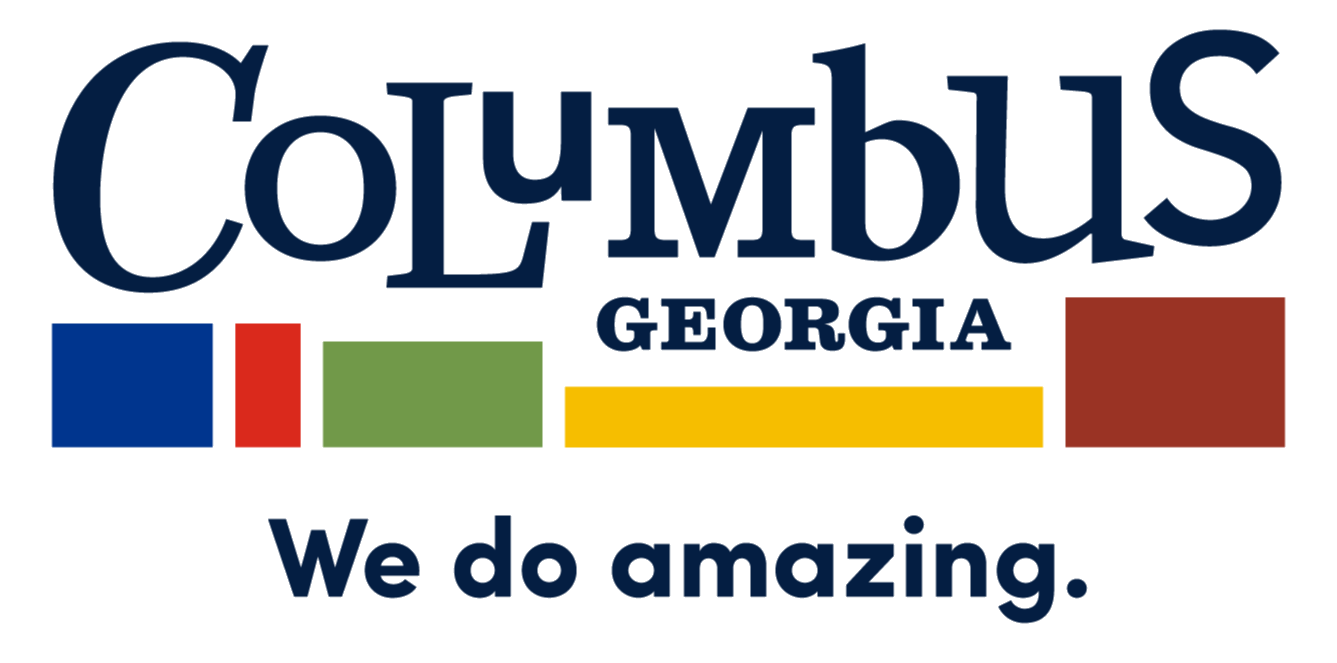
- Flag Seal Logo
- Nicknames: The Fountain City or The Lowell of the South
- Motto: "We Do Amazing"
- Location within Georgia

- Location within the state of Georgia Location within the USA
- Coordinates: 32°29′32″N 84°56′25″W
- Country: United States
- State: Georgia
- County: Muscogee
- Founded: 1828
- Named for: Christopher Columbus

Government
  - Mayor: B. H. "Skip" Henderson III
  - City Manager: Tyson Begly

Area
  - Consolidated city-county: 221.01 sq mi (572.42 km^{2})
  - Land: 216.50 sq mi (560.73 km^{2})
  - Water: 4.51 sq mi (11.68 km^{2})
- Elevation: 243 ft (74 m)

Population (2020)
  - Consolidated city-county: 206,922
  - Rank: 123rd in the United States; 2nd in Georgia
  - Density: 955.8/sq mi (369.02/km^{2})
  - Urban: 267,746 (US: 153rd)
  - Urban density: 1,874.2/sq mi (723.6/km^{2})
  - Metro: 328,883 (US: 157th)
- Demonym: Columbusite
- Time zone: UTC−5 (EST)
  - Summer (DST): UTC−4 (EDT)
- ZIP codes: 31820, 31829, 31900–09, 31914, 31917, 31993–94, 31997–99
- Area codes: 706, 762
- FIPS code: 13-19007
- GNIS feature ID: 0331158
- Airport: Columbus Airport (CSG)
- Website: columbusga.gov

Columbus is a consolidated city-county located on the west-central border of the U.S. state of Georgia. Columbus lies on the Chattahoochee River directly across from Phenix City, Alabama. It is the county seat of Muscogee County, with which it officially merged in 1970; the original merger excluded Bibb City, which joined in 2000 after dissolving its own city charter.

Columbus is the second most populous city in Georgia (after Atlanta), and fields the state's fourth-largest metropolitan area. At the 2020 U.S. census, Columbus had a population of 206,922, with 328,883 in the Columbus metropolitan statistical area. The metro area joins the nearby Alabama cities of Auburn and Opelika to form the Columbus–Auburn–Opelika combined statistical area, which had a population of 563,967 in 2020.

Columbus lies 100 miles (160 km) southwest of Atlanta. Fort Benning, the United States Army's Maneuver Center of Excellence and a major employer, is located south of the city in southern Muscogee and Chattahoochee counties. Columbus is home to museums and tourism sites, including the National Infantry Museum, dedicated to the U.S. Army's Infantry Branch. It has the longest urban whitewater rafting course in the world constructed on the Chattahoochee River.

== History ==
=== From Indigenous cultural center to incorporation ===
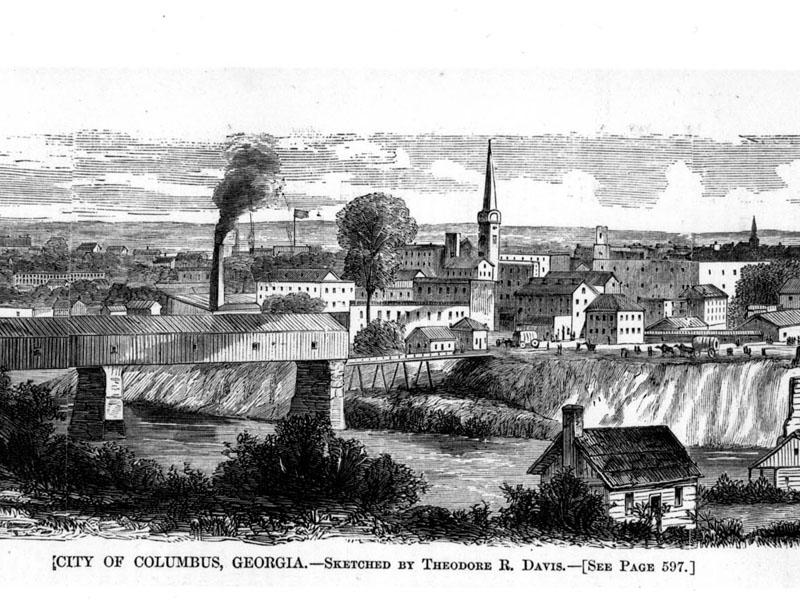
Downtown in 1880

Founded in 1828 by an act of the Georgia Legislature, Columbus was situated at the beginning of the navigable portion of the Chattahoochee River and on the last stretch of the Federal Road before entering Alabama. The city was named for Christopher Columbus. The plan for the city was drawn up by Dr. Edwin L. DeGraffenried, who placed the town on a bluff overlooking the river. Edward Lloyd Thomas (surveyor) was selected to lay out the town on 1,200 acres. Across the river to the west, where Phenix City, Alabama, is now located, lived several tribes of the Creek and other Georgia and Alabama indigenous peoples. Most Creeks moved west with the 1826 Treaty of Washington. Those who stayed and fought were forcibly removed in 1836.

The river served as Columbus's connection to the world, particularly enabling it to ship its commodity cotton crops from the plantations to the international cotton market via New Orleans and ultimately Liverpool, England. The city's commercial importance increased in the 1850s with the arrival of the railroad. In addition, textile mills were developed along the river, bringing industry to an area reliant upon agriculture. By 1860, the city was one of the more important industrial centers of the South, earning it the nickname the Lowell of the South, referring to an important textile mill town in Massachusetts.

=== Civil War and Reconstruction ===
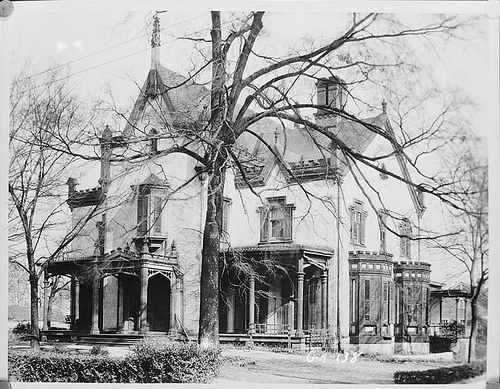
Redd House, Columbus, Historic American Buildings Survey

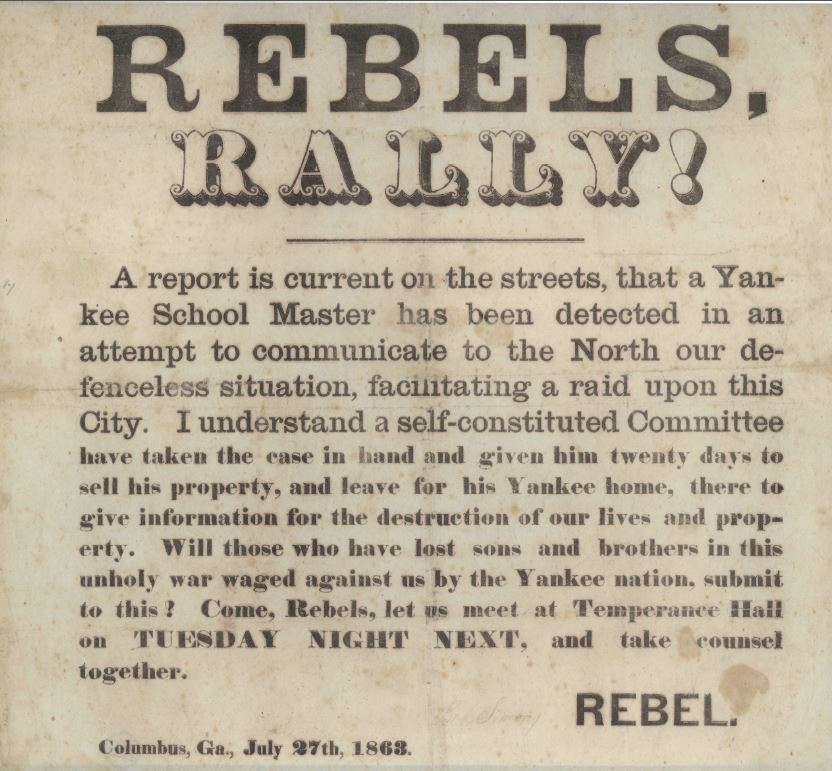
An 1863 broadside published in Columbus warning of an impending attack

When the American Civil War broke out in 1861, the industries of Columbus expanded their production; this became one of the most important centers of industry in the Confederacy. During the war, Columbus ranked second only to the Confederate capital city of Richmond, Virginia in the manufacture of supplies for the Confederate army. The Eagle Manufacturing Company made various textiles, especially woolens for Confederate uniforms. The Columbus Iron Works manufactured cannons and machinery for the nearby Confederate Navy shipyard, Greenwood and Gray made firearms, and Louis and Elias Haimon produced swords and bayonets. Smaller firms provided additional munitions and sundries. As the war turned in favor of the Union, each industry faced exponentially growing shortages of raw materials and skilled labor, as well as worsening financial opportunities.

Unaware of Lee's surrender to Grant and the assassination of Abraham Lincoln, Union and Confederates clashed in the Battle of Columbus, Georgia, on Easter Sunday, April 16, 1865, when a Union detachment of two cavalry divisions under Maj. Gen. James H. Wilson attacked the lightly defended city and burned many of the industrial buildings. John Stith Pemberton, who later developed Coca-Cola in Columbus, was wounded in this battle. Col. Charles Augustus Lafayette Lamar, owner of the last slave ship in America, was also killed here. A historic marker erected in Columbus notes that this was the site of the "Last Land Battle in the War from 1861 to 1865".

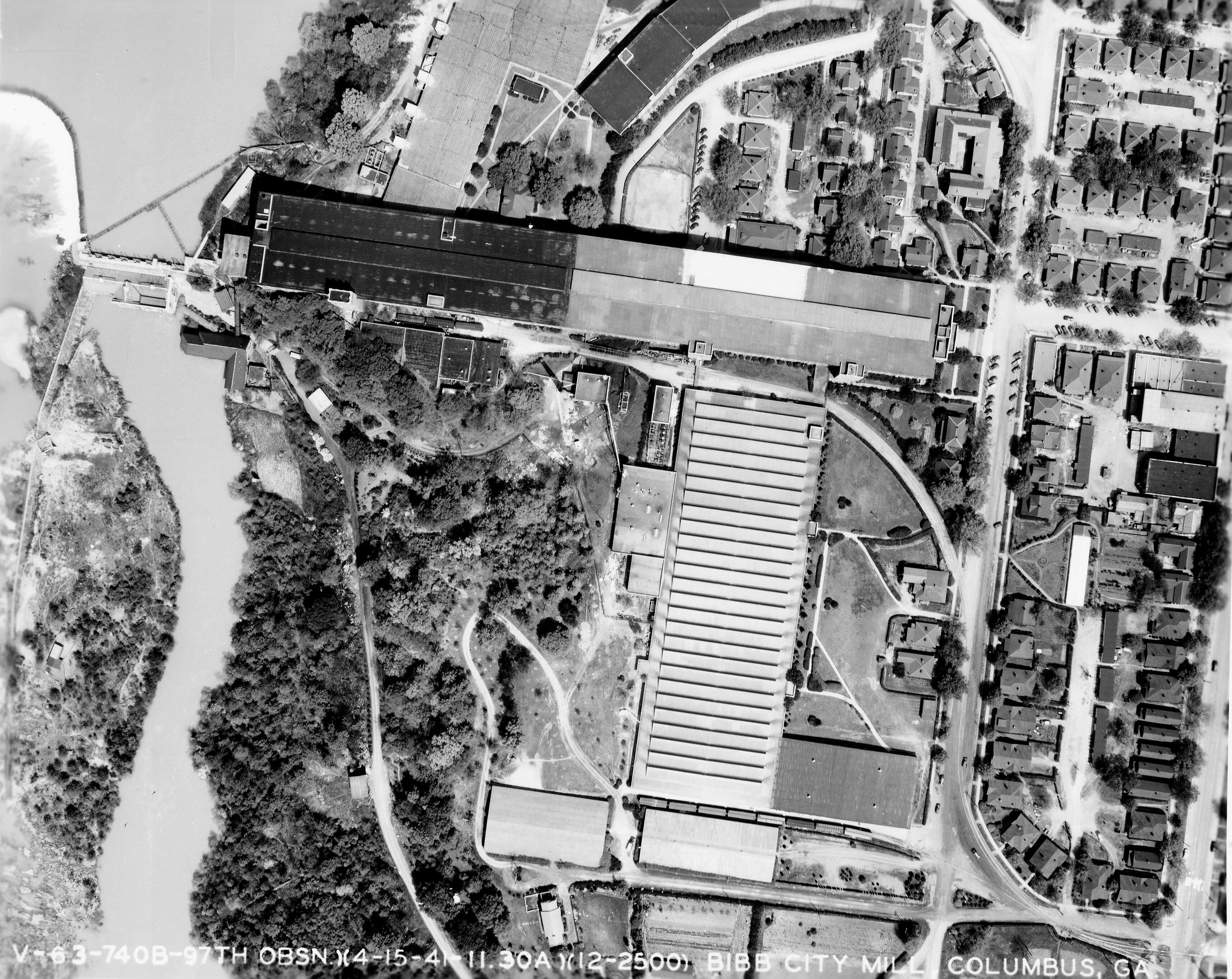
Bibb City Mill, 1939

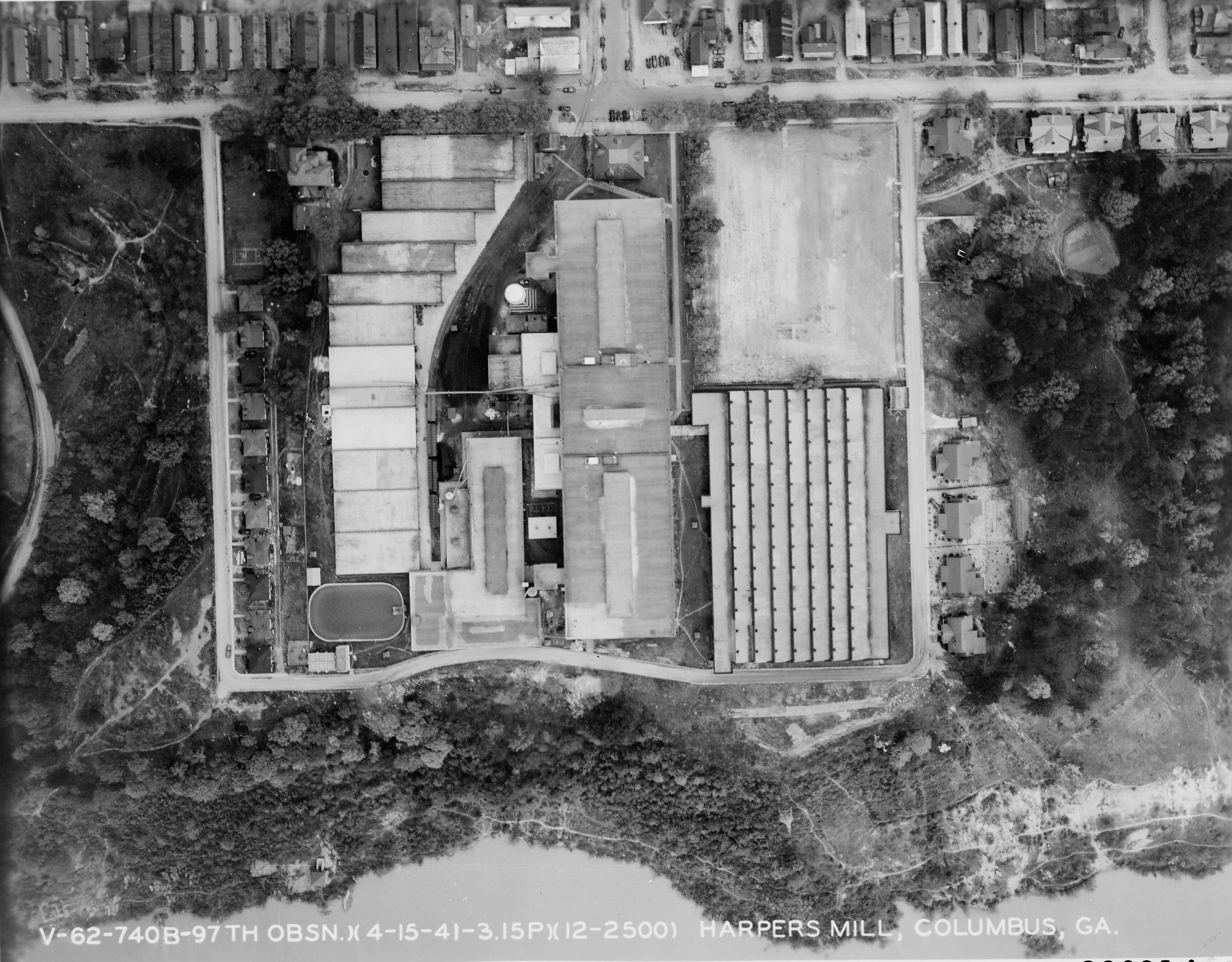
Harpers Mill, 1939

Reconstruction began almost immediately and prosperity followed. Factories such as the Eagle and Phenix Mills were revived and the industrialization of the town led to rapid growth, causing the city to outgrow its original plan. The Springer Opera House was built during this time, attracting such notables as Irish writer Oscar Wilde. The Springer is now the official State Theater of Georgia.

By the time of the Spanish–American War, the city's modernization included the addition of a new waterworks, as well as trolleys extending to outlying neighborhoods such as Rose Hill and Lakebottom. Mayor Lucius Chappell also brought a training camp for soldiers to the area. This training camp, named Camp Benning, grew into present-day Fort Benning, named for General Henry L. Benning, a native of the city. Fort Benning was one of the ten U.S. Army installations named for former Confederate generals that were renamed on 11 May 2023, following a recommendation from the congressionally mandated Naming Commission that Fort Benning be renamed Fort Moore after Lieutenant General Hal Moore and his wife Julia Compton Moore, both of whom are buried on post. On 3 March 2025, the Secretary of Defense ordered that the name of Fort Moore be reverted to Fort Benning. The new name pays tribute to Corporal Fred G. Benning, who was awarded the Distinguished Service Cross for his extraordinary heroism in action during World War I with the U.S. Army in France in 1918.

Downtown Columbus in the early 1950s

=== Confederate Memorial Day ===
In the spring of 1866, the Ladies Memorial Association of Columbus passed a resolution to set aside one day annually to memorialize the Confederate dead. The secretary of the association, Mary Ann Williams, was directed to write a letter inviting the ladies of every Southern state to join them in the observance. The letter was written in March 1866 and sent to representatives of all of the principal cities in the South, including Atlanta, Macon, Montgomery, Memphis, Richmond, St. Louis, Alexandria, Columbia, and New Orleans. This was the beginning of the influential work by ladies' organizations to honor the war dead.

The date for the holiday was selected by Elizabeth Rutherford Ellis. She chose April 26, the first anniversary of Confederate General Johnston's final surrender to Union General Sherman at Bennett Place, North Carolina. For many in the South, that act marked the official end of the Civil War.

In 1868, General John A. Logan, commander in chief of the Union Civil War Veterans Fraternity called the Grand Army of the Republic, launched the Memorial Day holiday that is now observed across the entire United States. General Logan's wife said he had borrowed from practices of Confederate Memorial Day. She wrote that Logan "said it was not too late for the Union men of the nation to follow the example of the people of the South in perpetuating the memory of their friends who had died for the cause they thought just and right."

While two dozen cities across the country claim to have originated the Memorial Day holiday, Bellware and Gardiner firmly establish that the holiday began in Columbus. In The Genesis of the Memorial Day Holiday in America, they show that the Columbus Ladies Memorial Association's call to observe a day annually to decorate soldiers' graves inaugurated a movement first in the South and then in the North to honor the soldiers who died during the Civil War.

=== 20th century ===
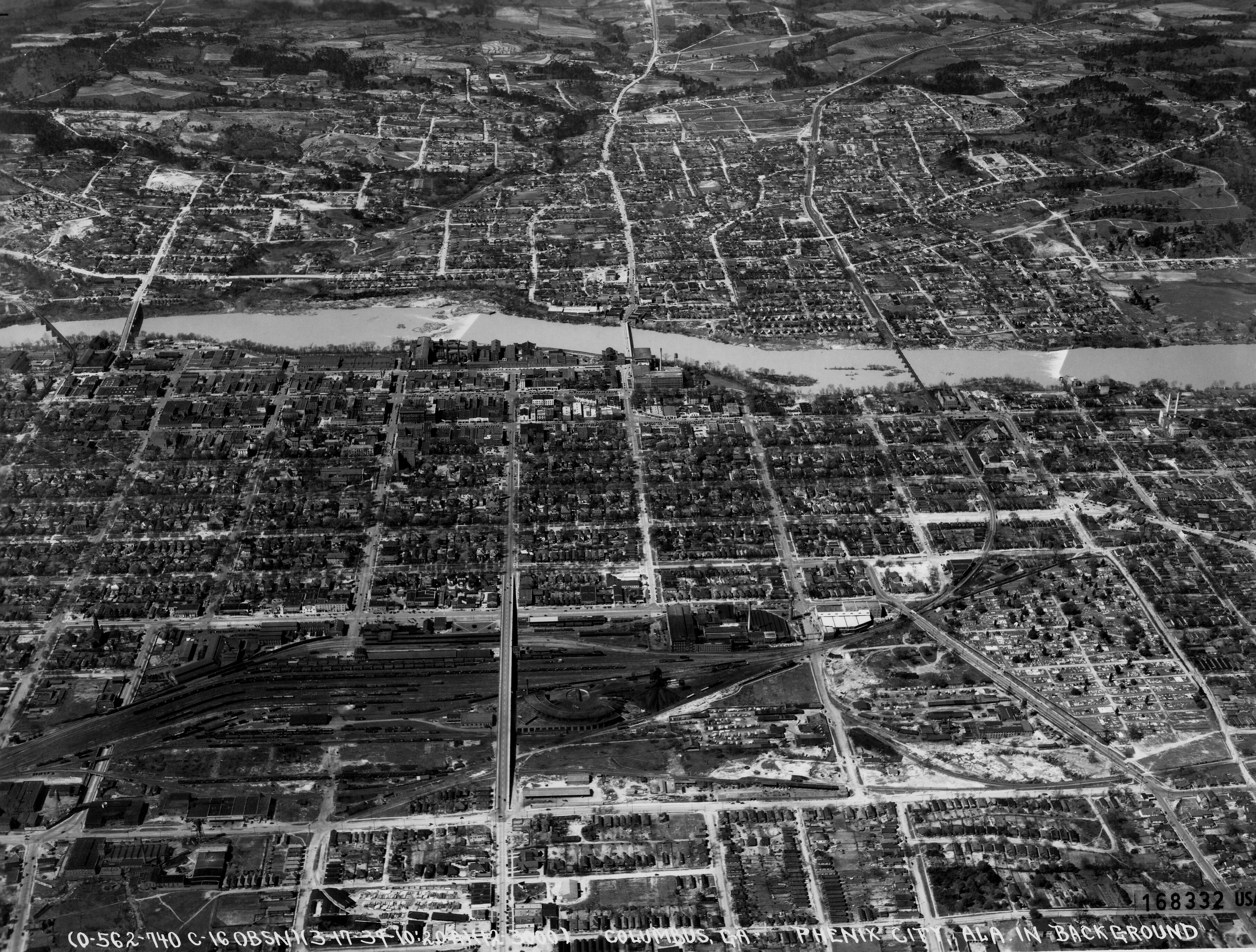
View of Columbus in 1939

With the expansion of the city, leaders established Columbus College, a two-year institution, which later evolved into Columbus State University, now a comprehensive center of higher learning and part of the University System of Georgia.

The city government and the county consolidated in 1971, the first such consolidation in Georgia and one of only 16 in the U.S. at the time.

"Columbus, Georgia: the Place with the Power and the Push"

Expanding on its industrial base of textile mills, the city is the home of the headquarters for Aflac, Synovus, and TSYS.

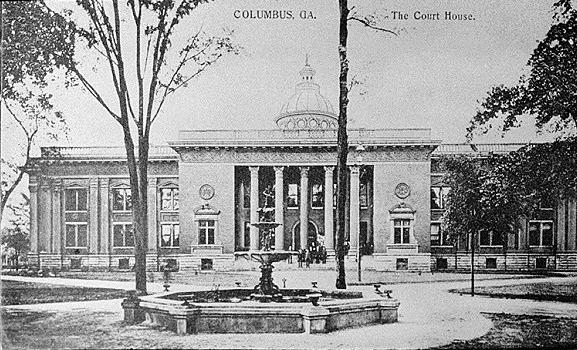
The Muscogee County Courthouse in 1941, which was demolished in 1973

From the 1960s through the 1980s, the subsidized construction of highways and suburbs resulted in drawing off the middle and upper classes, with urban blight, white flight, and prostitution in much of downtown Columbus and adjacent neighborhoods. Early efforts to halt the gradual deterioration of downtown began with the saving and restoration of the Springer Opera House in 1965. It was designated as the State Theatre of Georgia, helping spark a movement to preserve the city's history. This effort has documented and preserved various historic districts in and around downtown.

Through the late 1960s and early 1970s, large residential neighborhoods were built to accommodate the soldiers coming back from the Vietnam War and for those associated with Fort Benning. These range from Wesley Woods to Leesburg to Brittney and Willowbrook and the high-end Sears Woods and Windsor Park. Large tracts of blighted areas were cleaned up. A modern Columbus Consolidated Government Center was constructed in the city center. A significant period of urban renewal and revitalization followed in the mid- to late 1990s.

With these improvements, the city has attracted residents and businesses to formerly blighted areas. Municipal projects have included construction of a softball complex, which hosted the 1996 Olympic softball competition; the Chattahoochee RiverWalk; the National Civil War Naval Museum at Port Columbus; and the Coca-Cola Space Science Center. Other notable projects were the expansion of the Columbus Museum and road improvements to include a new downtown bridge crossing the Chattahoochee River and into Phenix City. During the late 1990s, commercial activity expanded north of downtown along the I-185 corridor.

Folder of souvenir postcards of Columbus and Fort Benning

=== 21st century ===
During the 2000s, the city began a major initiative to revitalize the downtown area. The project began with the South Commons, an area south of downtown containing the softball complex, A. J. McClung Memorial Stadium, Synovus Park, the Columbus Civic Center, and the Jonathan Hatcher Skateboard Park. The National Infantry Museum was constructed in South Columbus, located outside the Fort Benning main gate.

In 2002, Columbus State University, which previously faced expansion limits due to existing residential and commercial districts surrounding it, began a second campus downtown, starting by moving the music department into the newly opened RiverCenter for the Performing Arts. The university's art, drama, and nursing departments also moved to downtown locations. Such initiatives have provided Columbus with a cultural niche; downtown features modern architecture mixed among older brick facades.

The Ready to Raft 2012 project created an estimated 700 new jobs and is projected to bring in $42 million annually to the Columbus area. Demolishing an up-river dam allowed the project to construct the longest urban whitewater rafting course in the world. According to the Columbus Convention and Visitors Bureau, this initiative, in addition to other outdoor and indoor tourist attractions, led to around 1.8 million visitors coming to Columbus during the city's 2015 fiscal year.

The city predicted that an additional 30,000 soldiers would be trained annually at Fort Benning in upcoming years due to base realignment and closure of other facilities.

In October 2024, Columbus Police Department Chief Stoney Mathis announced a full staff had been achieved. The Department reported a force consisting of 369 police officers and 54 dispatchers.

== Geography ==
Downtown panorama (1886)

Columbus is one of Georgia's three Fall Line cities, along with Augusta and Macon. The Fall Line is where the hilly lands of the Piedmont plateau meet the flat terrain of the coastal plain. As such, Columbus has a varied landscape of rolling hills on the north side and flat plains on the south. The fall line causes rivers in the area to decline rapidly towards sea level. Textile mills were established here in the 19th and early 20th centuries to take advantage of the water power from the falls.

Interstate 185 runs north–south through the middle of the city, with nine exits within Muscogee County. I-185 runs north about 50 mi (80 km) from its beginning to a junction with I-85 just east of LaGrange and about 60 mi (97 km) southwest of Atlanta. U.S. Route 27, U.S. Route 280, and Georgia State Route 520 (known as South Georgia Parkway) all meet in the interior of the city. U.S. Route 80 runs through the northern part of the city, locally known as J.R. Allen Parkway; Alternate U.S. Route 27 and Georgia State Route 85 run northeast from the city, locally known as Manchester Expressway.

The city is located at 32°29′23″N 84°56′26″W.

According to the US Census Bureau, the city has a total area of 221.0 square miles (572 km^{2}), of which 216.3 square miles (560 km^{2}) are land and 4.7 square miles (12 km^{2}) (2.14%) are covered by water.

Columbus borders Phenix City, its largest suburb (in Alabama). Columbus also borders Chattahoochee, Talbot, Harris, and Russell County, which is in Alabama.

=== Climate ===
Columbus has a humid subtropical climate (Köppen Cfa). Daytime summer temperatures often reach highs above 95°F and on occasion will approach or exceed 100°F. The all-time high temperature in Columbus was 106°F, set on June 30, 2012 during an exceptional heat wave in the Southeast. Low temperatures in the winter average in the upper 30s, with several nights a year seeing temperatures below freezing. There are two recorded instances of temperatures below 0°F in the city: -2°F on January 21, 1985, part of a larger cold wave that affected the eastern half of the country; and the all-time record low of -3°F on February 13, 1899, part of another exceptional Arctic outbreak. Columbus is often considered a dividing line or "natural snowline" of the southeastern United States with areas north of the city receiving snowfall annually, with areas to the south typically not receiving snowfall every year or at all.

Columbus is within USDA hardiness zone 8b in the city center and zone 8a in the suburbs.

Climate data for Columbus Airport, Georgia (1991–2020 normals, extremes 1891–present)
Month	Jan	Feb	Mar	Apr	May	Jun	Jul	Aug	Sep	Oct	Nov	Dec	Year
Record high °F (°C)	84 (29)	84 (29)	92 (33)	95 (35)	100 (38)	106 (41)	105 (41)	104 (40)	106 (41)	101 (38)	88 (31)	84 (29)	106 (41)
Mean maximum °F (°C)	73.5 (23.1)	76.6 (24.8)	83.8 (28.8)	87.2 (30.7)	92.8 (33.8)	96.5 (35.8)	98.6 (37.0)	98.1 (36.7)	94.7 (34.8)	88.4 (31.3)	81.2 (27.3)	75.2 (24.0)	99.5 (37.5)
Mean daily maximum °F (°C)	58.7 (14.8)	63.2 (17.3)	70.4 (21.3)	77.7 (25.4)	85.1 (29.5)	90.2 (32.3)	92.9 (33.8)	91.8 (33.2)	87.3 (30.7)	78.3 (25.7)	68.4 (20.2)	60.6 (15.9)	77.0 (25.0)
Daily mean °F (°C)	48.5 (9.2)	52.3 (11.3)	58.9 (14.9)	65.8 (18.8)	74.1 (23.4)	80.4 (26.9)	83.2 (28.4)	82.4 (28.0)	77.6 (25.3)	67.6 (19.8)	57.3 (14.1)	50.6 (10.3)	66.6 (19.2)
Mean daily minimum °F (°C)	38.2 (3.4)	41.5 (5.3)	47.3 (8.5)	54.0 (12.2)	63.1 (17.3)	70.5 (21.4)	73.5 (23.1)	73.0 (22.8)	67.9 (19.9)	56.8 (13.8)	46.1 (7.8)	40.6 (4.8)	56.0 (13.3)
Mean minimum °F (°C)	20.9 (−6.2)	25.9 (−3.4)	30.6 (−0.8)	39.0 (3.9)	49.3 (9.6)	61.7 (16.5)	67.8 (19.9)	66.1 (18.9)	55.6 (13.1)	40.6 (4.8)	30.4 (−0.9)	25.5 (−3.6)	19.2 (−7.1)
Record low °F (°C)	−2 (−19)	−3 (−19)	16 (−9)	28 (−2)	39 (4)	44 (7)	59 (15)	57 (14)	38 (3)	24 (−4)	10 (−12)	4 (−16)	−3 (−19)
Average precipitation inches (mm)	4.24 (108)	4.46 (113)	4.92 (125)	4.03 (102)	3.24 (82)	4.03 (102)	4.35 (110)	4.68 (119)	3.34 (85)	2.78 (71)	3.96 (101)	4.79 (122)	48.82 (1,240)
Average snowfall inches (cm)	0.0 (0.0)	0.0 (0.0)	0.2 (0.51)	0.0 (0.0)	0.0 (0.0)	0.0 (0.0)	0.0 (0.0)	0.0 (0.0)	0.0 (0.0)	0.0 (0.0)	0.0 (0.0)	0.3 (0.76)	0.5 (1.3)
Average precipitation days (≥ 0.01 in)	10.2	8.9	9.4	8.0	7.8	10.4	11.8	11.2	7.0	6.5	7.3	10.2	108.7
Average snowy days (≥ 0.1 in)	0.0	0.0	0.1	0.0	0.0	0.0	0.0	0.0	0.0	0.0	0.0	0.3	0.4
Source: NOAA

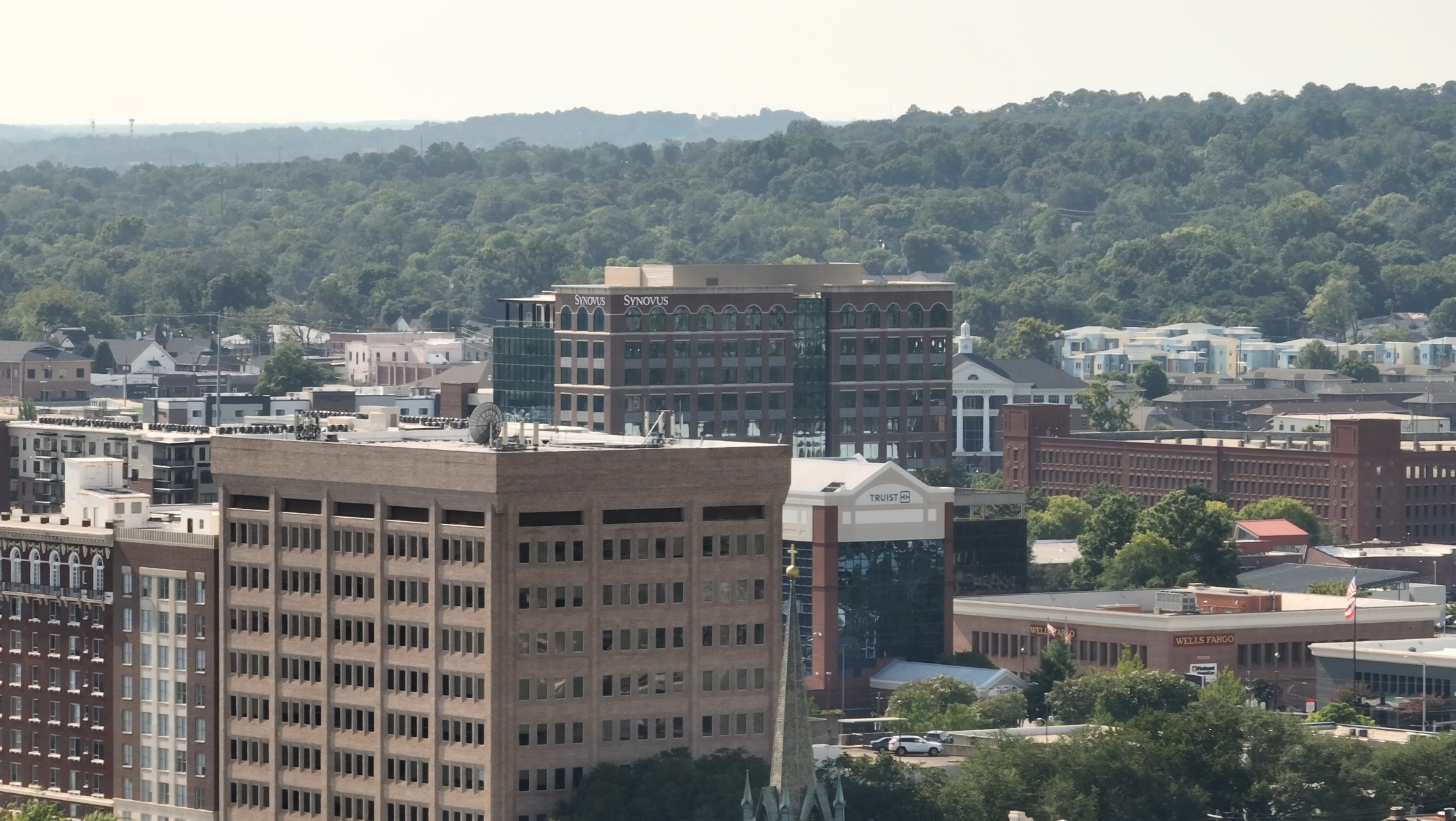
Downtown Columbus skyline looking west

=== Cityscape ===
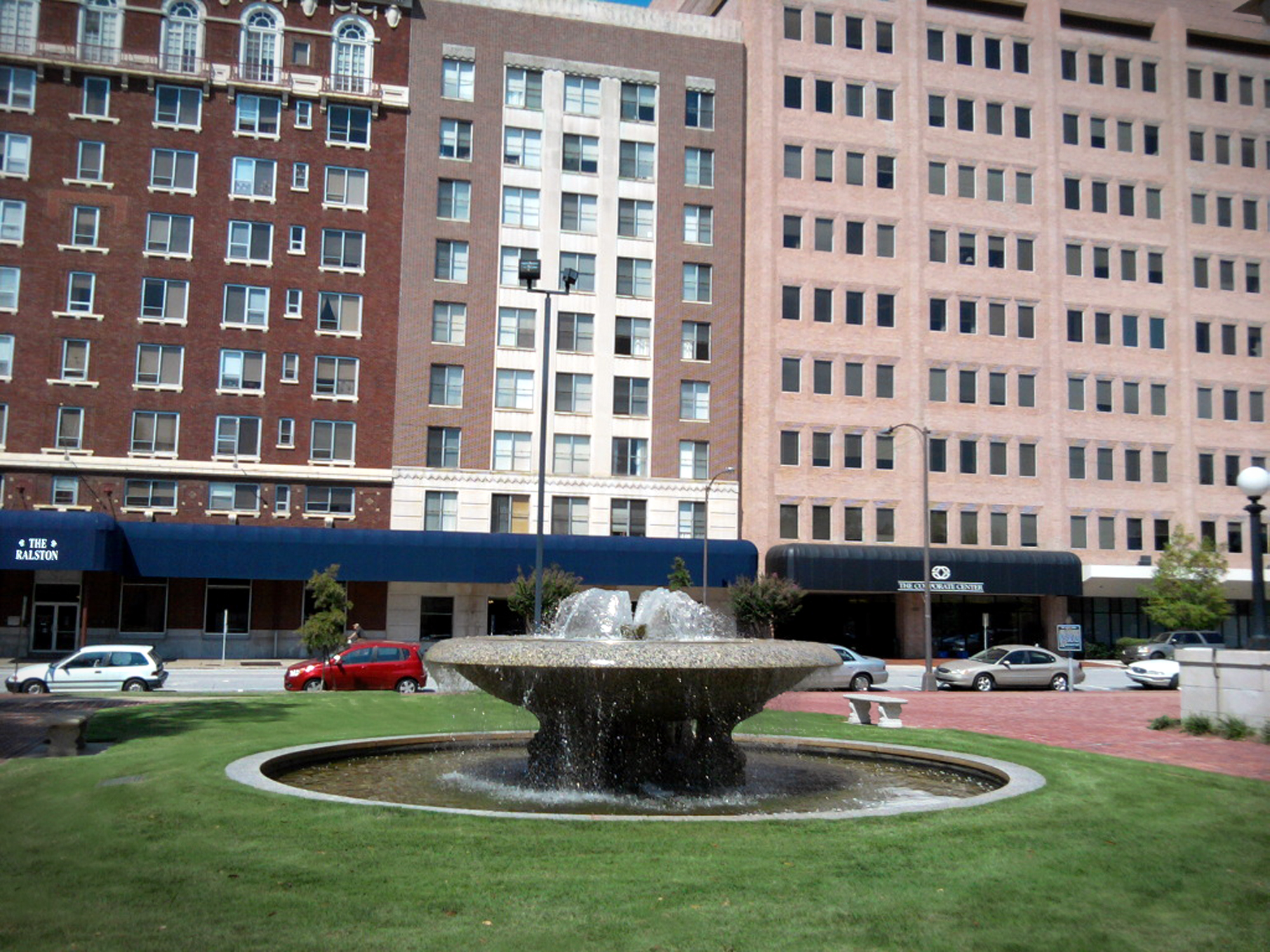
One of Columbus' nicknames is "The Fountain City".

Columbus is divided into five geographic areas:

- Downtown, also sometimes called "Uptown" (though "Uptown" is actually the title given to both a nonprofit organization operating to encourage area growth and development or "urban renewal" in the city and also to the actual physical area of that development itself, which is an expanding subsection of the downtown district located in the areas from Broadway to the Chattahoochee River) is the city's central business district, and home to multiple historic districts, homes, and churches, such as the Columbus Historic Riverfront Industrial District, the Mott House, and the Church of the Holy Family.
- East Columbus is a predominantly residential area located east of MidTown.

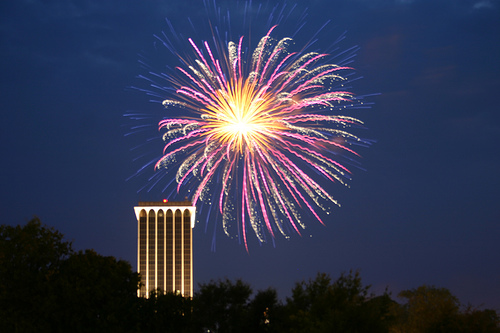
Fireworks in Downtown on July 4, 2009

- MidTown is a residential and commercial area located directly east of Downtown; several historic districts have been designated. It is the location of the corporate headquarters of Aflac.
- North Columbus, also called Northside, is a diverse suburban area, home to established neighborhoods and subdivisions, such as Green Island Hills and Oldtown. It has multiple shopping and lifestyle areas.
- South Columbus is situated just south of the MidTown region, and directly north of Fort Benning. It is the site of the National Infantry Museum, honoring the history of infantry forces in the U.S. Army. The museum was located here in an effort to introduce jobs and attract visitors to stimulate a variety of activities. It has had bars, honky tonks, and other businesses that appeal to young male soldiers from Fort Benning.

=== Metropolitan area ===
The Columbus metropolitan area includes four counties in Georgia, and one in Alabama. The Columbus-Auburn-Opelika, GA-AL combined statistical area includes two additional counties in Alabama. A 2013 census estimate showed 316,554 in the metro area, with 501,649 in the combined statistical area.

== Demographics ==
Historical population
Census	Pop.	Note	%±
1830	1,152		—
1840	3,114		170.3%
1850	5,942		90.8%
1860	9,621		61.9%
1870	7,401		−23.1%
1880	10,123		36.8%
1890	17,303		70.9%
1900	17,614		1.8%
1910	20,554		16.7%
1920	31,125		51.4%
1930	43,131		38.6%
1940	53,280		23.5%
1950	79,611		49.4%
1960	116,779		46.7%
1970	155,028		32.8%
1980	169,441		9.3%
1990	178,681		5.5%
2000	185,781		4.0%
2010	189,885		2.2%
2020	206,922		9.0%
2024 (est.)	201,830	▼	−2.5%
U.S. Decennial Census; 1990 2000 2010 2020

Columbus, Georgia – Racial and ethnic composition Note: the US Census treats Hispanic/Latino as an ethnic category. This table excludes Latinos from the racial categories and assigns them to a separate category. Hispanics/Latinos may be of any race.
Race / Ethnicity (NH = Non-Hispanic)	Pop 2000	Pop 2010	Pop 2020	% 2000	% 2010	% 2020
White alone (NH)	90,200	82,890	79,083	48.55%	43.65%	38.22%
Black or African American alone (NH)	80,698	85,119	94,701	43.44%	44.83%	45.77%
Native American or Alaska Native alone (NH)	614	599	488	0.33%	0.32%	0.24%
Asian alone (NH)	2,788	4,061	5,546	1.50%	2.14%	2.68%
Pacific Islander alone (NH)	248	378	517	0.13%	0.20%	0.25%
Some Other Race alone (NH)	297	432	1,076	0.16%	0.23%	0.52%
Mixed Race or Multi-Racial (NH)	2,568	4,296	8,998	1.38%	2.26%	4.35%
Hispanic or Latino (any race)	8,368	12,110	16,513	4.50%	6.38%	7.98%
Total	185,781	189,885	206,922	100.00%	100.00%	100.00%

Since the 1830 United States census, Columbus has maintained a relatively positive population growth. At the 2020 census, there were 206,922 people, 73,134 households, and 45,689 families residing in the city. At the 2010 census, Columbus had a total population of 189,885, up from 186,291 in the 2000 census. The 2010 census reported 189,885 people, 72,124 households, and 47,686 families residing in the city. The population density was 861.4 inhabitants per square mile (332.6/km^{2}). The 82,690 housing units had an average density of 352.3 per square mile (136.0/km^{2}).

In 2010, the racial and ethnic composition of the city was 46.3% White, 45.5% African American, 2.2% Asian, 0.2% Native American, 0.14% Pacific Islander, and 1.90% from other races. Hispanics or Latinos of any race were 6.4% of the population. In 2020, its population was 38.22% non-Hispanic white, 45.77% African American, 0.24% Native American, 2.68% Asian, 0.25% Pacific Islander, 0.52% some other race, 4.35% multiracial, an 7.98% Hispanic or Latino of any race.

At the 2010 census, median income for a household in the city was $41,331, and for a family was 41,244. Males had a median income of $30,238 versus $24,336 for females. The per capita income for the city was $22,514. About 12.8% of families and 15.7% of the population were below the poverty line, including 22.0% of those under age 18 and 12.1% of those age 65 or over. According to the 2022 American Community Survey, the median household income throughout the city was $53,750 with a per capita income of $31,393. Approximately 17.8% of the population lived at or below the poverty line.

== Crime ==
Columbus' crime rate is above the national average. Columbus set a homicide record in 2021 with 70 homicides. Growing gang activity within the city is a major reason for the rise in crime. City leaders are actively working to reduce crime in the city.

== Economy ==
Companies headquartered in Columbus include Aflac, TSYS, Realtree, Synovus and the W. C. Bradley Co.

=== Top employers ===
According to Columbus' 2025 Comprehensive Annual Financial Report, the top employers in the city were:

#	Employer	# of employees
1	Fort Benning	42, 487
2	Muscogee County School District	4,617
3	Piedmont Columbus Regional Hospital	3,080
4	Aflac	2,900
5	Columbus Consolidated Government	2,894
6	TSYS - Global Payments	2,600
7	Pratt & Whitney	1,850
8	St. Francis Hospital	1,735
9	Blue Cross Blue Shield of Georgia (part of Anthem)	1,650
10	Columbus State University	1,238

== Arts and culture ==
Postcard: "Hello from Columbus, Georgia"

=== Points of interest ===
==== Museums ====
- Founded in 1953, the Columbus Museum (accredited by the American Alliance of Museums) contains artifacts of regional history and works of American art. It mounts displays from its permanent collection, as well as temporary exhibitions. It is the largest art and history museum in Georgia.
- The National Civil War Naval Museum at Port Columbus is a 40,000-square-foot (3,700 m^{2}) facility that opened in 1962. It features two original Civil War military vessels, uniforms, equipment, and weapons used by the Union and Confederate navies.
- The National Infantry Museum and Soldier Center opened in June 2009, and includes displays related to the history of the infantry from the founding of the nation to the present. Its IMAX theatre shows related films and special productions.
- The U.S. Army Armor and Cavalry Collection Is located on the Harmony Church side of Fort Benning. It is a relatively new collection in Columbus but is known for housing one of the largest collections of historic armored vehicles in the world. It is only open few days per year.

Postcard of 1011 Broadway

==== Shopping ====
Columbus is served by one major indoor shopping mall, Peachtree Mall, which is anchored by major department stores Dillard's, Macy's, and J.C. Penney. The total retail floor area is 821,000 f^{2}t (76,300 m^{2}). Major strip malls include Columbus Park Crossing, which opened in 2003, and The Landings, which opened in 2005. Columbus is also served by The Shoppes at Bradley Park, a lifestyle center.

MidTown contains two of the city's early suburban shopping centers (the Village on 13th and St. Elmo), both recently renovated and offering local shops, restaurants, and services.

==== Major venues ====
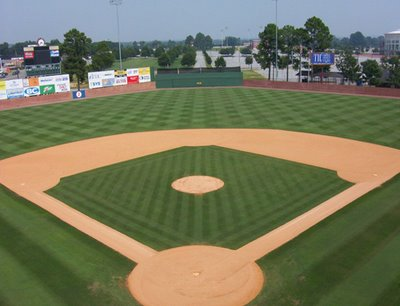
Pinnacle Park, Columbus' oldest baseball park

Major venues in the city of Columbus:

- A. J. McClung Memorial Stadium, a football stadium, hosted football games between the Georgia Bulldogs and the Auburn Tigers (the Deep South's Oldest Rivalry) from 1916 to 1958. It became the home of college football's Pioneer Bowl in December 2010, and hosts annual rivalry games between Tuskegee University and Morehouse College, as well as between Albany State University and Fort Valley State University.
- The Bradley Theater, a performance theatre, was opened in mid-1940 by Paramount Pictures.
- Columbus Civic Center, a 10,000-seat multi-purpose arena, opened in 1996. It is the primary arena used for concerts and professional sporting events in Columbus. The Columbus Lions indoor football team and Columbus River Dragons ice hockey team both call the Civic Center home.
- Pinnacle Park, a 5,000-seat baseball stadium, was the former home to the Columbus Catfish. The minor-league Columbus Redstixx, and is the host stadium of the Columbus Clingstones. It was also the site of the softball events of the 1996 Summer Olympics. It opened in 1926, making it the city's oldest baseball park.
- RiverCenter for the Performing Arts, a 2,000-seat modern performance theatre, first opened in 2002 and is operated by the Columbus nonprofit organization RiverCenter Inc. It is commonly used for local events and occasionally used for nationally recognized performances.
- The Springer Opera House, a National Historic Landmark and the official State Theatre of Georgia. Built in 1871, the Springer is a professional theatre that produces live theatre and hosts one of America's largest theatre training programs, the Springer Theatre Academy. Former United States President Jimmy Carter proclaimed it the State Theatre of Georgia for its 1971 centennial season. The legislature made the designation permanent in 1992.

==== Historic districts ====
Columbus Historic Riverfront Industrial District

Columbus is home to nine historic districts, all listed in the National Register of Historic Places listings in Muscogee County, Georgia. They are:

- Bibb City Historic District
- Columbus Historic District
- Columbus Historic Riverfront Industrial District
- Dinglewood Historic District
- Peacock Woods-Dimon Circle Historic District
- Weracoba-St. Elmo Historic District
- Wynn's Hill-Overlook-Oak Circle Historic District
- Wynnton Village Historic District
- Waverly Terrace Historic District

Columbus, Georgia: The Electric City. Compiled and published under the direction of the Convention and Publicity Bureau, Chamber of Commerce, Columbus, Georgia

== Sports ==
Club	Sport	League	Venue
Columbus Lions	Indoor football	American Arena League	Columbus Civic Center
Columbus River Dragons	Hockey	Federal Prospects Hockey League	Columbus Civic Center
Columbus United	Soccer	USL League Two	A. J. McClung Memorial Stadium
Columbus Elite	Soccer	United Premier Soccer League	Odis Spencer Stadium
Columbus Clingstones	Baseball	Southern League	Pinnacle Park

Columbus Northern Little League won the 2006 Little League World Series, defeating the team from Kawaguchi, Japan in the championship. Former MLB player Josh Lester was a member of the championship team.

== Parks and recreation ==
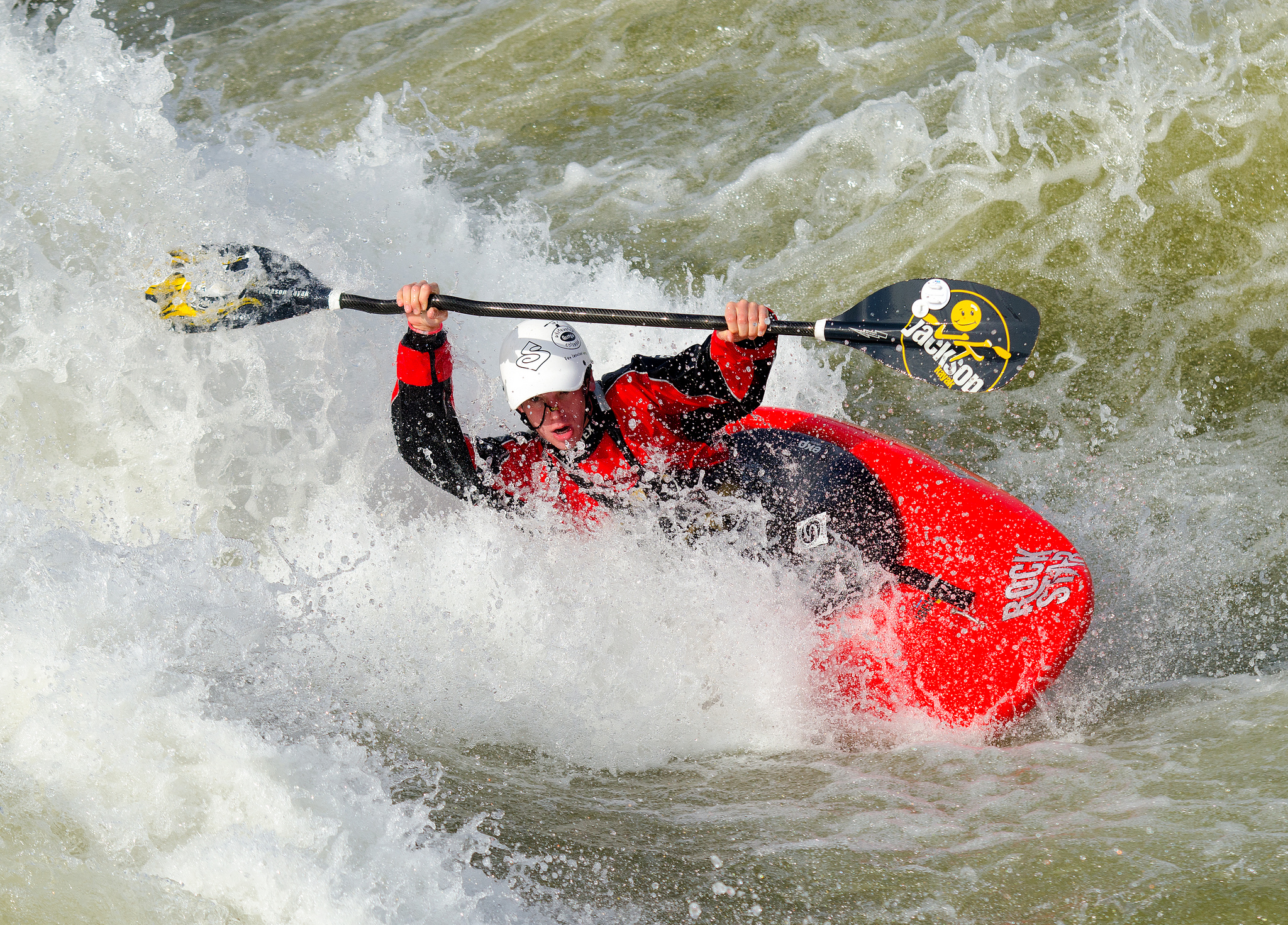
Whitewater kayaking in the Chattahoochee River

Columbus is home to upwards of 50 parks, four recreation centers, four senior centers and parks, and the Standing Boy Creek Park.

=== Walking trails ===
- The Chattahoochee RiverWalk is a 15-mile (24 km) walking/bike trail that connects users from Downtown to South Columbus and the northern section of Fort Benning.
- The Columbus Fall Line Trace is an 11-mile (18 km) fitness trail that runs from Downtown to the northeastern section of the city.
- The Black Heritage Trail is a National Recreation Trail of historic and cultural significance.

=== Whitewater kayaking, rafting, and zip-line ===
The Chattahoochee River whitewater opened in 2012. After both the Eagle & Phenix Dam and the City Mills Dams were breached, river flow was restored to natural conditions, allowing the course to be created. The 2.5-mile (4.0 km) course is the longest urban whitewater rafting and kayaking in the world, and has been ranked the world's best manmade whitewater course by USA Today. It also features the Blue Heron Adventure, a zip-line course connecting users from the Georgia side of the river to the Alabama side on an interstate zip-line over the Chattahoochee River. The course continues with several zip-lines and a ropes course on the Alabama side and completes with another zip-line back to Georgia.

It has become a hub for whitewater kayakers, with outstanding standing waves year-round. In mid-winter it is referred to as the "Wintering Grounds" for big wave surfing athletes and enthusiasts.

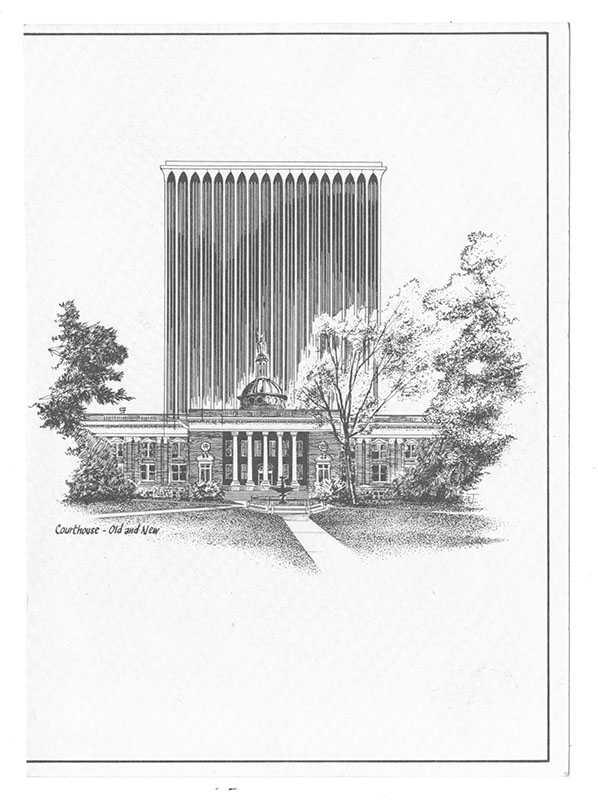
Old and new courthouse

== Law and government ==
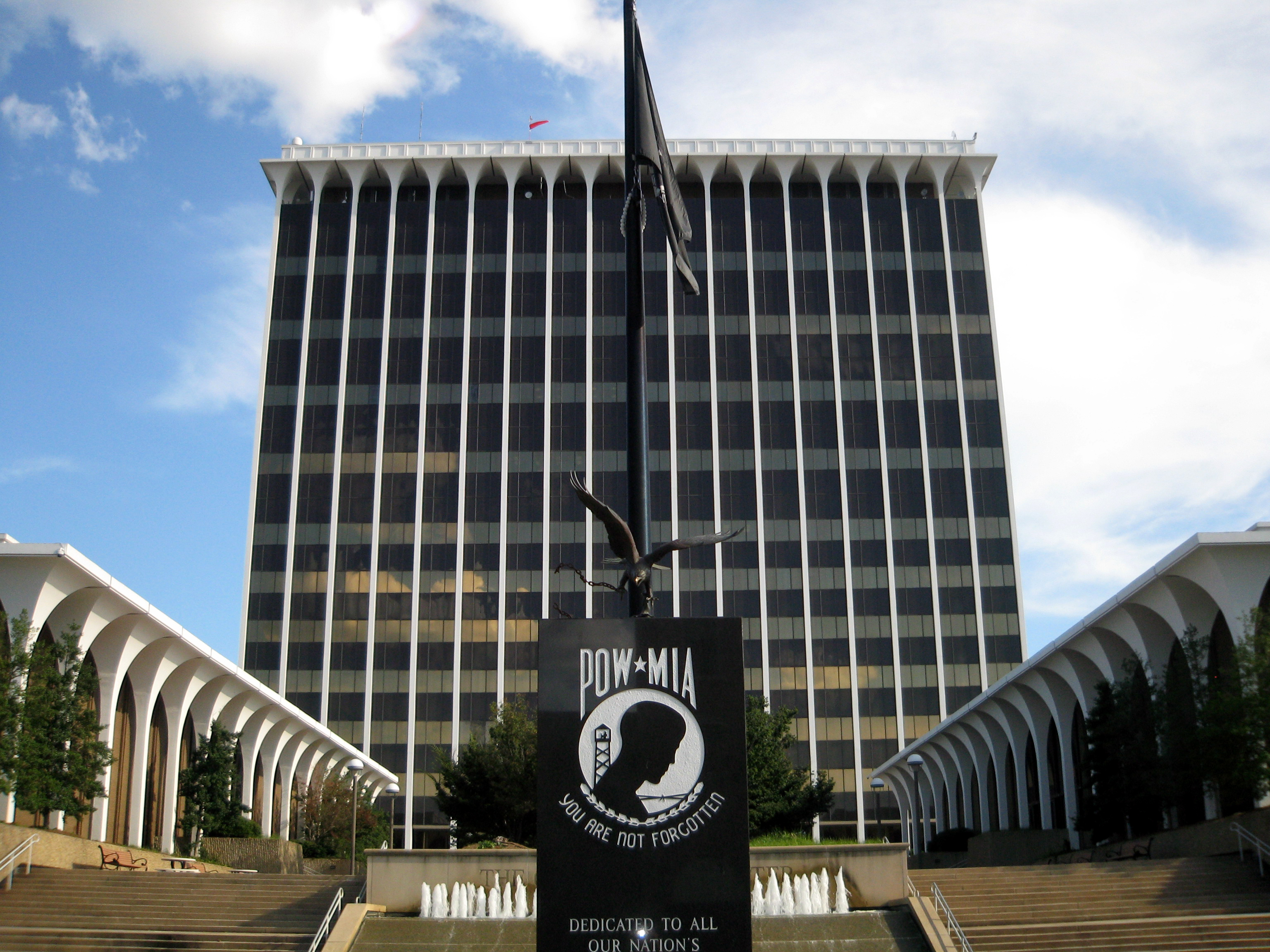
Columbus Consolidated Government Center

=== Elected officials ===
==== Mayor ====
Mayors are limited to two consecutive terms. B. H. "Skip" Henderson III currently serves as mayor of Columbus since 2019. He succeeded Teresa Tomlinson, and will be succeeded by former city manager Isaiah Hugley in January 2029.

==== City council ====
The city council of Columbus, known as the Columbus Council, is composed of ten elected council members, eight of whom serve individual districts and two of whom serve the city at large. The city has a council–manager government, with the city council appointing the city manager to implement city policy. Isaiah Hugley served as city manager from 2005-2025. After a search lasting more than a year, Tyson Begly was selected as the new city manager and approved by the Columbus Council on June 9th 2026.

Council member	District	Location	Notable features
Simi Barnes	District 1	East-central	Cooper Creek Park; Columbus Public Library
Glenn Davis	District 2	North Columbus	Green Island Country Club
Bruce Huff	District 3	South Columbus	Aflac headquarters building
Toyia Tucker	District 4	East	Carver Park; Shirley Winston Park
Charmaine Crabb	District 5	North-central	Columbus State University; Columbus Airport
Gary Allen	District 6	Northeast	Flat Rock Park
JoAnne Cogle	District 7	Downtown	National Infantry Museum
Walker Garrett	District 8	MidTown	Columbus Technical College; Weracoba and Wildwood Parks
Cathy Cook	At large	City-wide	N/A
Travis L. Chambers	At large	City-wide	N/A

== Education ==
=== Primary and secondary education ===
The Muscogee County School District holds preschool to grade 12, and consists of 35 elementary schools, 12 middle schools, and nine high schools. The district has over 2,000 full-time teachers and over 31,899 students.

Muscogee County School District serves all parts of the county except Fort Benning for grades K-12. Fort Benning children are zoned to Department of Defense Education Activity (DoDEA) schools for grades K-8. However, high school students attend the public high schools in the respective counties they are located in.

=== Libraries ===
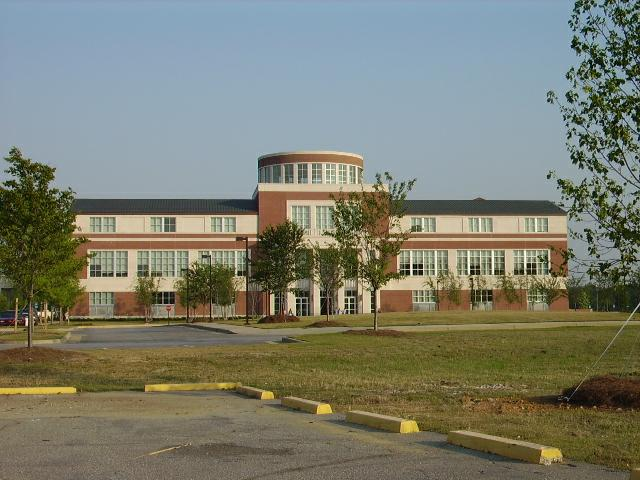
Columbus Public Library

Columbus is served by four branches of the Chattahoochee Valley Libraries:

- Columbus Public Library
- Mildred L. Terry Public Library
- North Columbus Public Library
- South Columbus Public Library

=== Higher education ===
==== Public ====
- Columbus State University
- Columbus Technical College
- Georgia Military College – main campus in Milledgeville, Georgia

==== Private, for profit ====
- Christian Life School of Theology
- Miller-Motte Technical College – main campus in Wilmington, North Carolina
- Rivertown School of Beauty
- Southeastern Beauty School
- Strayer University – main campus in Baltimore, Maryland

==== Private, nonprofit ====
- Embry-Riddle Aeronautical University Fort Benning – main campus in Daytona Beach, FL
- Mercer University School of Medicine - main campus in Macon, Georgia

== Transportation ==
=== Aviation ===
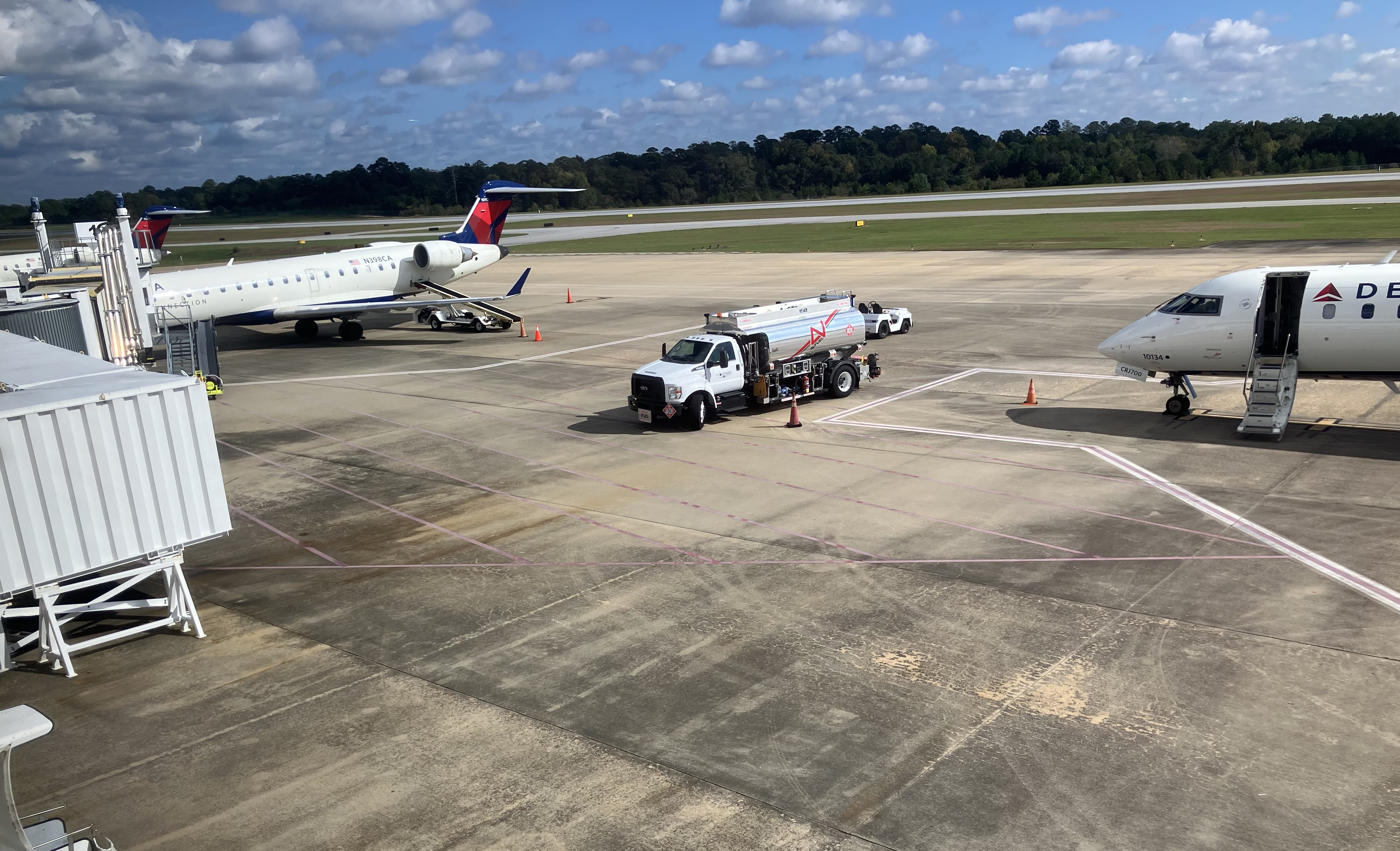
Three Delta Connection CRJs parked at the gates of Columbus Airport

Columbus has had regularly scheduled air service since June 19, 1929, when the Columbus Municipal Airport saw the inauguration of flights to Atlanta and Montgomery. It was replaced by the Columbus Airport (IATA: CSG, ICAO: KCSG, FAA LID: CSG) on August 1, 1944. Since then, the Columbus Airport has served as the metro area's primary airport, although general aviation activities continued at Columbus Municipal Airport until its closure in 1969.

Columbus Airport has become the fourth-busiest airport in Georgia. It is located just off I-185 along Airport Thruway and Armour Road. It is served by Endeavor Air's Delta Connection service, offering several daily flights to Atlanta.

=== Highways ===
==== Interstate ====
- Interstate 185

==== U. S. routes ====
- U.S. Route 27
- U.S. Route 27 Alternate
- U.S. Route 80
- U.S. Route 280

==== Georgia state routes ====
- S.R. 1
- S.R. 22
- State Route 22 Connector
- State Route 22 Spur
- S.R. 85
- S.R. 219
- S.R. 411 (unsigned designation for I-185)
- S.R. 520
- S.R. 540 (Fall Line Freeway)

=== Bus lines ===
- METRA Transit System is the primary provider of mass transportation in Muscogee County, currently operating 10 routes in Columbus. The current public transportation services are operated as a function of the Columbus Consolidated Government under METRA.
- Greyhound Lines provides intercity bus service with the Columbus station located on Veterans Parkway, Downtown Columbus.

=== Railroads ===
Through the 1960s, passenger trains of the Central of Georgia Railway made stops at Columbus Union Station, including the north–south Chicago-Florida trains, the Illinois Central Railroad's City of Miami, and Seminole. Other trains included local Central of Georgia trains to Atlanta, Albany and Macon. The final trains in 1971 were the City of Miami and the Man O' War to Atlanta. Columbus has had no passenger service since Amtrak took over most passenger trains on May 1, 1971,

In the 21st century, freight service is provided by Norfolk Southern Railroad and the shortline Columbus and Chattahoochee Railroad.

== Sister cities ==
Columbus has these official sister cities:

- Zugdidi, Georgia (country)
- Kiryū, Gunma, Japan (Since April 25, 1978)
- Bistriţa, Romania (Since May 2023)
- Taichung, Taiwan (Since November 11, 2007 )

== See also ==
- List of people from Columbus, Georgia
- List of neighborhoods in Columbus, Georgia
- List of mayors of Columbus, Georgia
- List of schools in Muscogee County, Georgia
- Metro Columbus
- Shannon Hosiery Mill
- List of U.S. cities with large Black populations
- Bibliography of the history of Columbus, Georgia
