= Publicis New York =

American advertising agency

- Formerly: Publicis Kaplan Thaler
- Industry: Advertising agency
- Founded: 1997
- Founders: Linda Kaplan Thaler, Robin Koval
- Headquarters: 1675 Broadway New York City, United States
- Key people: Carla Serrano(CEO); Erica Roberts(CCO); Mick McCabe(CSO)
- Products: Traditional and Digital Marketing services such as: Web Development; Social Media; E-Commerce; Brand Strategy
- Revenue: $5.7B per year
- Number of employees: 1,000–5,000
- Parent: Publicis
- Website: www.publicisna.com

Publicis New York (formerly Publicis Kaplan Thaler) is an American advertising agency based in New York City. It was founded in 1997 and has 2,000 employees with offices in New York, Seattle, Toronto, and Montreal. Publicis acquired the Kaplan Thaler Group in 2012. The agency created the Aflac duck, Herbal Essences Totally Organic Experience, Continental Airlines "Work Hard. Fly Right.", and Swiffer Sweeper campaigns.

== History ==
The Kaplan Thaler Group was founded in 1997 by Linda Kaplan Thaler and Robin Koval.

On July 12, 2012, Publicis Kaplan Thaler was formed in the merger of Publicis Worldwide and Kaplan Thaler Group.

On June 30, 2015, Publicis Kaplan Thaler shortened its name to Publicis New York and officially put the PKT name and KTG agency to rest.

On February 9, 2016, it was announced that Linda Kaplan Thaler would be stepping down from her position as Chairman. Her intentions were to focus on promoting her fourth book and launching an independent production company.

=== Locations ===
After the 2012 merger, Publicis began construction to renovate KTG's offices at 1675 Broadway, located adjacent to Times Square. The 190,000 SF space spanned across eight floors of open-seating in the Activity-Based Working framework, designed by the award-winning Clive Wilkinson. Construction concluded in 2016 and brightly colored walls, carpet and a Lego wall were now replaced with a sea of red carpets and an open floor plan workspace. The space won in the Large Office category for Interior Design's awards in 2018.

In 2019, the Publicis Groupe renewed its 680,000 square foot lease at 375 Hudson st. and added an expansion of 280,000 square feet, totaling just under a million square feet for over 20 years. This was the original location of Saatchi & Saatchi, which was also acquired by Publicis in 2000. The intention was to establish the agency's permanent location and invest $150 million upgrading the offices. All Publicis-owned offices in New York were relocated to 375 Hudson, including 1675 Broadway. This was in an effort to have deeper collaboration and connectivity across agencies.

== Services ==
Publicis New York is a full service agency that offers traditional and digital capabilities. It separates into two specialty shops: A digital, CRM, analytics, and experiential agency and a brand identity/ consulting agency.

These capabilities include:

- Experiential, Promotional, and Integrated Marketing
- Customer & Data Intelligence
- Digital Marketing
- E-Commerce
- Web Development
- Social Media
- Brand Design & Strategy
- Mobile Marketing
- Direct Response
- Data Management
- Shopper Marketing
- CRM & Customer Analytics
- Loyalty Programs
- Television
- Print
- Radio
- Out-of-Home

== Works ==
The original Kaplan Thaler Group is recognized for creating the Aflac duck, Herbal Essences Totally Organic Experience, Continental Airlines "Work Hard. Fly Right.", and Swiffer Sweeper campaigns.

Companies Publicis New York works with:

- Diesel
- Walmart
- S&P Global
- Cadillac
- Cafe Bustelo
- Always
- JIF
- Meow Mix
- Scope
- Heineken
- Red Lobster
- CITI
- Folger
- Milk Bone

A campaign done by Publicis New York was for the Citi bike, "Unlock New York". The brand campaign communicated that "When you unlock a bike. You unlock New York." It was recognized with many accolades and awards, and resulted in over 280,000 app downloads.

== Awards ==
- 2012: Internet Advertising Awards Best Restaurant Social Media Campaign for Girl Behind Six
- 2012: Internet Advertising Awards Best Food Industry Interactive application, Best Restaurant Interactive application, Best of Show Interactive application for Beef Equity – Here's the Beef
- 2012: Internet Advertising Awards Best Food Industry Online Video, Best Restaurant Online Video for Beef Equity – Factory Tour
- 2018: Outdoor Advertising Association of America names Publicis New York as the Agency-of-Record.

== Publications ==
Previous CEO and Chief Creative Officer, Linda Kaplan Thaler and President Robin Koval are the authors of three books:

- BANG! Getting Your Message Heard in a Noisy World (Random House, 2003)
- THE POWER OF NICE: How to Conquer the Business World with Kindness (Random House, 2006)
- THE POWER OF SMALL: Why Little Things Make All the Difference (Doubleday, 2009)
