= Robin Koval =

American businesswoman

- Born: May 25, 1955 (age 71); New York, New York
- Education: Syracuse University Baruch College
- Occupations: CEO and President of Truth Initiative (2013-2023); Author
- Spouse: Kenneth Koval
- Children: 1
- Awards: 100 Most Influential Women in Advertising Other Awards

Robin Koval (born May 25, 1955) is an American author and former CEO and president of Truth Initiative , a nonprofit tobacco control organization best known for its Truth youth smoking prevention campaign. Koval also co-founded The Kaplan Thaler Group and later was the CEO of Publicis Kaplan Thaler (now Publicis New York), New York’s fifth largest advertising agency through November 2013.

== Early life and education ==
Koval is a native New Yorker, and has trained as a figure skater. She graduated from Syracuse University with a Bachelor of Fine Arts degree. She later earned her Master of Business Administration from Baruch College.

== Career ==
Throughout her career, Koval was a marketing strategist and new products expert. She has worked with clients across several categories, ranging from beauty and beverages to distilled spirits and pharmaceuticals. Koval was executive vice president of Interpublic's Gotham, Inc. and in 1997 she co-founded the Kaplan Thaler Group with her partner, Linda Kaplan Thaler.

In July 2012, the Kaplan Thaler Group merged with Publicis New York to form Publicis Kaplan Thaler, where Koval was CEO. The Kaplan Thaler Group, and later Publicis Kaplan Thaler, were responsible for the "Yes, Yes, Yes" Herbal Essences campaign and for the creation of the Aflac duck campaign. Other clients of the Kaplan Thaler Group include Procter & Gamble, L'Oreal, Champion, Edmunds, NAPA Auto Parts, Pfizer, SuperValu, U.S. Bank and Wendy's.

In 2013, Koval was named chief executive officer and president of Truth Initiative. She retired in October 2023.

Before moving to Washington, D.C., Koval was on the faculty of New York University as an adjunct professor in the Steinhardt School of Culture, Education, and Human Development.

== Publications and Appearances ==
Koval has authored four books with coauthor and former business partner Linda Kaplan Thaler:

- Grit to Great: How Perseverance, Passion, and Pluck Take You from Ordinary to Extraordinary (2015)
- The Power of Small: Why Little Things Make All the Difference (2009)
- The Power of Nice: How to Conquer the Business World with Kindness (2006)
- Bang!: Getting Your Message Heard in a Noisy World (2003)

Koval appears on television, contributes commentary to print and online outlets and speaks at conferences and colloquia for business, government and media audiences, including the Aspen Ideas Festival. Her guest television appearances have included NBC's "Today," "The Martha Stewart Show," as well as ABC's "Good Morning America" and "Nightline."

== Achievements and honors ==
During her time at Kaplan Thaler Group and Publicis Kaplan Thaler, Koval assisted with activities at pro-social and cause-related organizations, including the Girl Scouts' "Girls Go Tech" campaign that encouraged young girls to go into STEM disciplines. She also supported initiatives from the Make-A-Wish Foundation and the American Red Cross.

In September 2012, Koval was named by Advertising Age as one of the 100 Most Influential Women in Advertising. She is also the recipient of a 2011 New York Women in Communications Matrix Award and a 2011 Women's Venture Fund Highest Leaf Award. In 2008, she was named one of Self-Made Magazine's top 50 "Women Entrepreneurs Who Inspire," as well as one of the top 20 female entrepreneurs in the U.S. by Blogtrepreneur.com In November 2008, Koval was presented with the Women's Leadership Exchange Compass Award and, in January 2007, she was honored with the Advertising Women of New York's Working Mother of the Year Trailblazer Award.
