= Kaplan Thaler Group =

American advertising agency, 1997 to 2015

The Kaplan Thaler Group
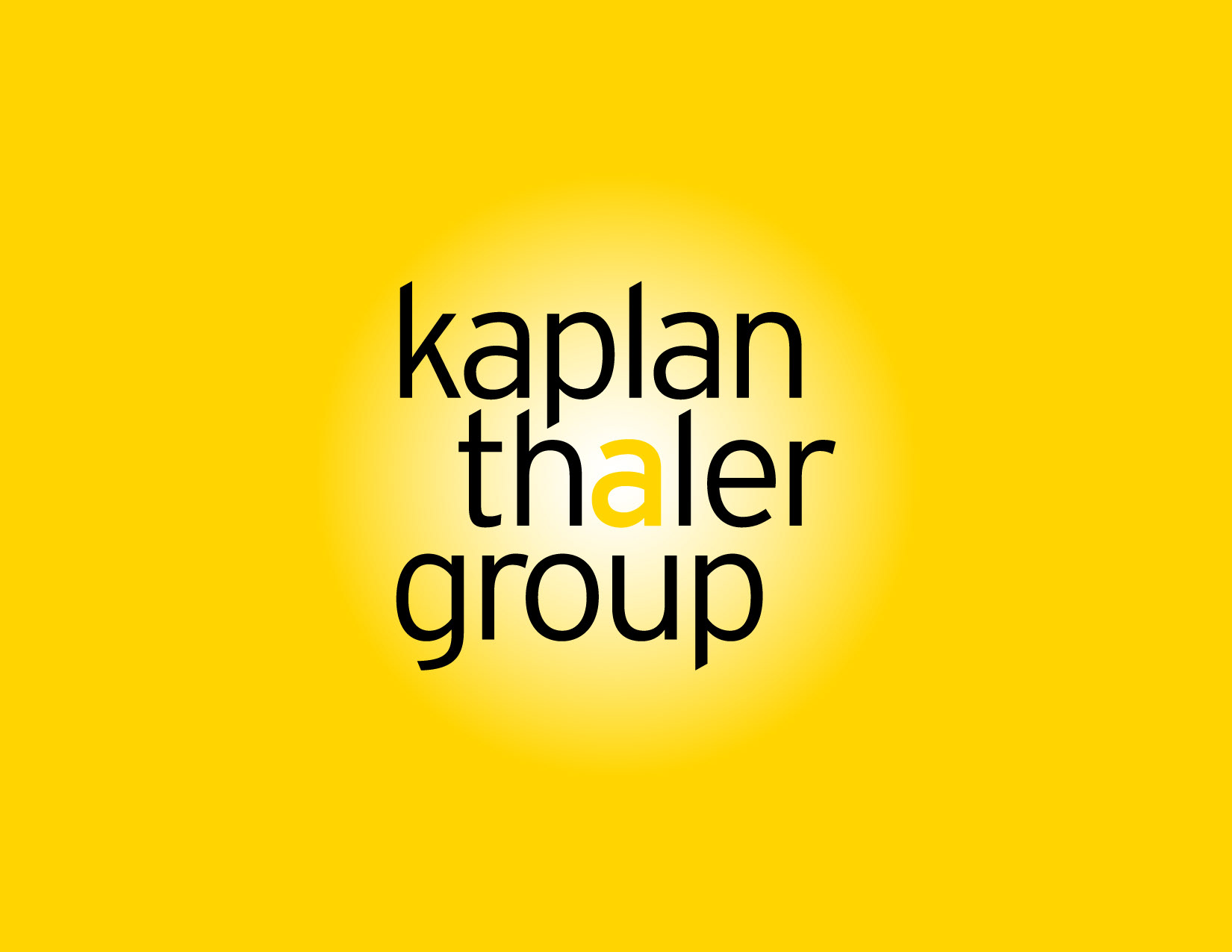
- Second logo used for the Kaplan Thaler group, until the merger with another agency in 2015 when the name changed
- Industry: Advertising
- Founded: 1997; 28 years ago
- Successor: Publicis New York

The Kaplan Thaler Group was an American advertising agency that opened in 1997, and created ad campaigns, including the Aflac Duck. The company began with six people in a small apartment. In July 2012, the Kaplan Thaler Group merged with Publicis New York.

== History ==
The Kaplan Thaler Group was an American advertising agency. It began as a small boutique agency out of the founder's home in Chelsea, Manhattan. The Kaplan Thaler Group began with six employees on the 700 square feet (65 m^{2}) third floor of the brownstone where Linda Kaplan Thaler lived on 19th Street in Chelsea. Linda Kaplan Thaler served as CEO and Chief Creative Officer of the Kaplan Thaler Group since founding the agency in 1997.

Over a period of 15 years, the Kaplan Thaler Group grew "from a startup to a company with more than $1 billion in billings." The agency created the Aflac duck, Herbal Essences Totally Organic Experience, Continental Airlines "Work Hard. Fly Right.", and Swiffer Sweeper campaigns.

In 2002, the advertising agency N. W. Ayer & Son, which called itself the oldest advertising agency, retired its name and merged with Kaplan Thaler Group, which served Ayer's client Continental Airlines. Also in 2002, the advertising agency D'Arcy Masius Benton & Bowles (DMB&B) was acquired by French firm Publicis and closed; longtime client Procter & Gamble shifted its Dawn and Swiffer brands from defunct D'Arcy Masius Benton & Bowles to Kaplan, adding roughly $80 million in U.S. billings.

On July 12, 2012, the Kaplan Thaler Group merged with Publicis New York, part of French multinational Publicis. The resulting company was called Publicis Kaplan Thaler. In June 2015, Publicis New York ended the use of the name "Kaplan Thaler".
