= St. Anne-Pacelli Catholic School (Columbus, Georgia) =

Private school in Columbus, Georgia, US

Location
- 2020 Kay Circle; Columbus, Muscogee County, Georgia 31907; United States; 32°29′0″N 84°56′3″W

Information
- Type: Private, coeducational
- Motto: Latin: Pax per sapientiam (Peace through wisdom) or Sapienta crescens et gratia (Increasing wisdom and grace).
- Religious affiliation: Christian
- Denomination: Roman Catholic
- Established: c. 2008 (18 years ago), merged from: St. Joseph's Academy, est. 1868 (158 years ago); Holy Family School, est. 1952 (74 years ago)?; Holy Family High School, est. 1958 (68 years ago)
- Founders: Reverend Monsignor Herman J. Deimel; Sisters of Mercy; Church of the Holy Family
- Oversight: Roman Catholic Diocese of Savannah
- Superintendent: Carrie Jane Williamson
- School code: 110832 or 00183
- Rector: Rev. Scott Winchel
- Lower School Principal: Heather Dalelio
- High School Principal: Carolyn Brewster
- Assistant Principal: Lance Henderson
- Assistant Principal: Katie Earnest
- Faculty: 19 (2014)
- Grades: PK–12
- Average class size: 10 (Preschool & Pre-K3); 20 (Pre-K4-5th grade); 18 (6th-8th grade); 13 (9th-12th grade)
- Student to teacher ratio: 11:1
- Campus size: 23 acres (0.093 km^{2})
- Colors: Red, white and navy
- Athletics: 15 interscholastic sports
- Athletics conference: GIAA Class AAAA
- Mascot: Rowdy the Viking
- Team name: Vikings/Lady Vikings
- Rival: Brookstone Cougars
- Accreditation: Southern Association of Colleges and Schools, Florida Catholic Conference (partial)
- Newspaper: Voice of the Vikings
- Yearbook: The Skald
- Affiliation: National Catholic Educational Association
- Partner in education: The Hughston Clinic
- Website: www.beaviking.com

St. Anne-Pacelli Catholic School is a private, Roman Catholic PK-12 school in Columbus, Georgia, United States. It is located in the Roman Catholic Diocese of Savannah and is the only Catholic high school in southwestern Georgia.

It resulted from the unification c. 2008 of St. Anne School, named for Saint Anne, the mother of the Virgin Mary, and Pacelli High School, named for Pope Pius XII (Eugenio Pacelli).

== History ==
In 1868, the Sisters of Mercy purchased a home in Downtown Columbus, Georgia and converted it into a convent. St. Joseph's Academy, a K–8 school, was formed at the same location in 1868. The school remained in Downtown Columbus until 1952, when population growth led to the establishment of a new Catholic school near Midtown Columbus. St. Joseph's then merged with this school.

Until St. Anne Church was built in 1961, the school operated under the name Holy Family School, and was operated by the Church of the Holy Family. The name was then changed to St. Anne School. In 2008, it was joined with Pacelli High School.

Meanwhile, on March 2, 1958, Holy Family High School was established by Reverend Monsignor Herman J. Deimel, priest at the Church of the Holy Family. Holy Family was the first Roman Catholic high school established in the city of Columbus, attached to Holy Family School (a K‒8 parish school). In late 1958, Thomas Joseph McDonough, Bishop of the Roman Catholic Diocese of Savannah, decided to change the name to honor Pope Pius XII (whose birth name was Eugenio Pacelli).

Pacelli's athletic program began with its first football team, which was established in 1960.

St. Anne Catholic Church was established in 1961 following a Mass being celebrated in the Pacelli cafeteria. The lower school, Holy Family School was changed to St. Anne School, and the new church was connected to it. In the summer of 1980, St. Anne Church and School, along with Pacelli, underwent extensive renovation. This renovation included a new St. Anne church, along with additions to St. Anne School. The original church was turned into a media center/library for Pacelli. During that time, the media center, contained six pews, an altar, and a small tabernacle for Sunday Services. The renovations concluded with the addition of the Pacelli Sports Arena, a multi-purpose gymnasium. Its name was later changed to the W. Donald Land Sports Arena.

In 1989, construction of the Elena Amos Arts and Science Center was completed. This allowed for the addition of five more classrooms, along with an alumni office. Later that year, Pacelli's fitness center (weight room) was also completed. It was later named after the late Nathan Rustin, a long-time Pacelli football coach. Pacelli expanded again in 1999, with new additions including a fully equipped science lab, updated art studio, renovated kitchen and faculty dining facilities, and new building for administrative offices connected to St. Anne School.

In 2008, plans were finalized to combine Pacelli High School with St. Anne School. The decision to combine the schools came from the recommendation of various committees and St. Anne Catholic Church. Both schools are now governed by St. Anne Church. Pacelli and St. Anne School operate in a unified manner, sharing office workers, admission directors, and other employees.

In 2010, nearly all of Pacelli's athletic facilities received renovations. In 2011, the Nathan Rustin Fitness Center was completely renovated, and additions included new high quality weight lifting and exercise equipment. In May 2012, a donation from the Sisters of Mercy prompted a major renovation of the Pacelli media center/library, which was completed at the end of 2012.

== Academics ==
Pacelli is known locally for its numerous Advanced Placement classes. It offers AP classes in American Government, Biology, Calculus, Chemistry, English Literature, Microeconomics, Statistics, Studio Art, and United States History. As in most schools, students have the option of preparing for AP exams independently, and many do. Students travel to nearby Columbus State University to take their AP exams. Pacelli also offers 19 honors courses.

No strict core curriculum exists, but ninth and tenth graders are offered limited flexibility in their courses. Juniors and seniors are freer, selecting electives and other courses.

=== Graduation requirements ===
Pacelli students entering grade 9 must earn a minimum of 24 Carnegie credits. Students must take one core course each year in English, math, science, social studies, and religion. All students are also required to earn one credit in fine arts, as well as 1/2 credits in both health and physical education.

Course type	Credits needed
English	4 credits
Mathematics	4 credits
Science	4 credits
Religion	4 credits
Social studies	3 credits
Foreign language	2 credits
Health/physical education	1 credit
Fine arts elective	1 credit
Choice electives	1 credit

==== Community service ====
Each year, students must complete community service projects as part of religion class. 9th graders are required to do two projects per semester while 10th, 11th, and 12th graders are required to do three. Seniors are also required to do a senior project. To earn full credit for the projects, students must turn in a journal of each experience. The project portion of the students' Religion grade is 10% of their final average.

== Activities ==
=== Athletics ===
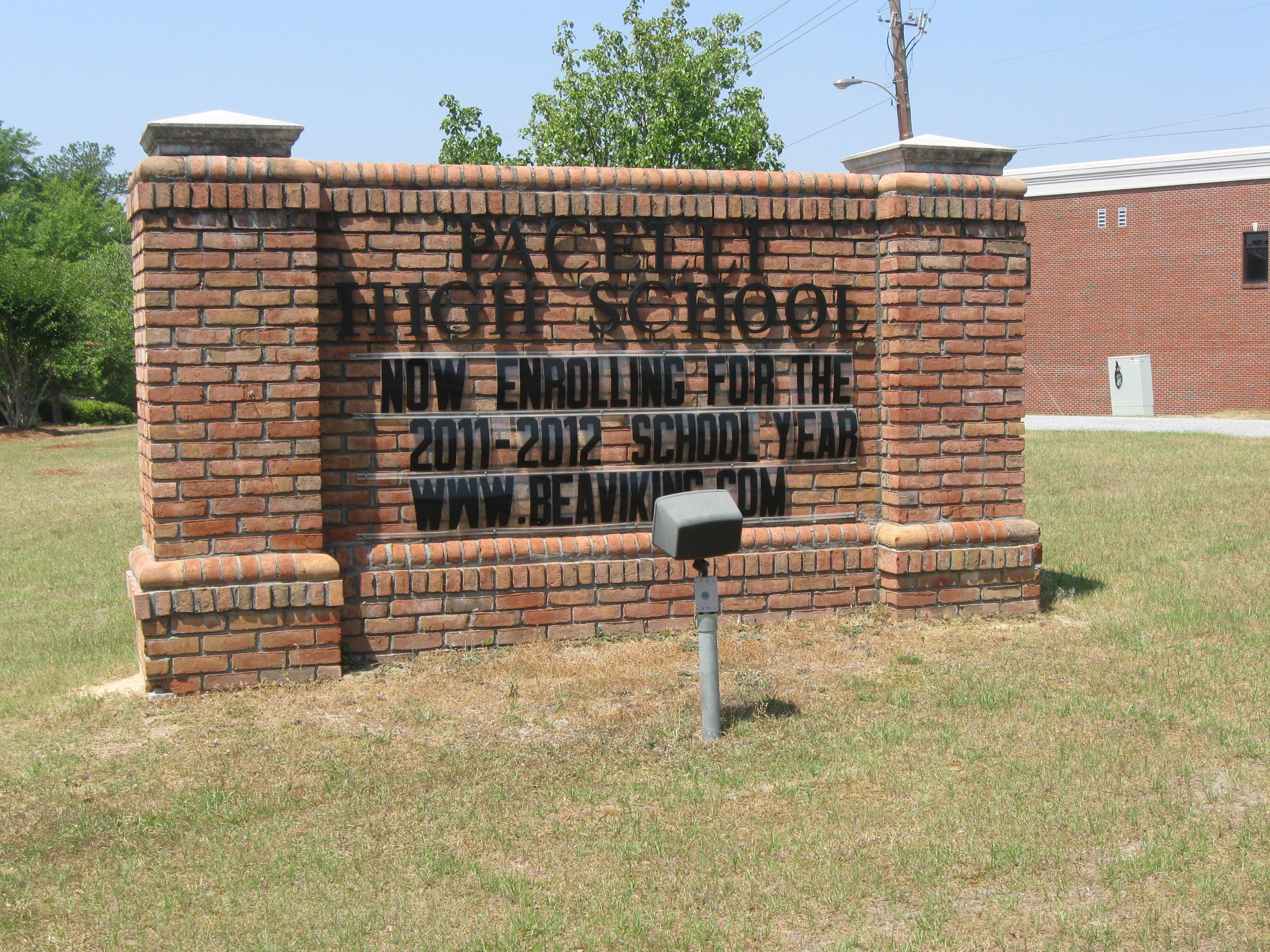
Original "Pacelli High School" sign (2011)

St. Anne-Pacelli Catholic School's athletic program begins in elementary school, as young as third grade. Middle and high school athletes compete in 15 sports.

The following sports programs are available for students: Baseball: grades 6-12; Boys' Basketball: grades 5-12; Boys' Cross Country: grades 5-12; Boys' Football: grades 6-12; Boys' Golf: grades 5-12; Boys' Soccer: grades 6-12; Boys' Swimming: grades 6-12; Boys' Tennis: grades 3-12; Boys' Track and Field: grades 8-12; Boys' and Bigger Dudes' Wrestling: grades 6-12.

At the varsity level, St. Anne-Pacelli competes as a AAAA member of the Georgia Independent Athletic Association (GIAA) created by the Georgia Independent School Association (GISA). It was in the Georgia High School Association (GHSA) until 2022.

Pacelli has competed in different regions and classifications under the Georgia High School Association as PHS has grown through the years:

- 1961-63: 3-C
- 1964-67: 3-South-B
- 1968-69: 5-South-B
- 1970-77: 5-B
- 1978-97: 5-A
- 1998-99: 3-A
- 2000-05: 2-A
- 2006-: 4-A

Interscholastic athletic teams
Sport	Level	Season	Gender
Baseball	V, JV	Spring	Boys'
Basketball	V, JV	Winter	Coed
Cheerleading	V, JV	Fall, winter	Girls'
Cross-country	V, JV	Fall	Coed
Football	V, JV	Fall	Boys'
Golf	V, JV	Spring	Coed
Soccer	V, JV	Spring	Coed
Softball	V, JV	Fall	Girls'
Tennis	V, JV	Spring	Coed
Volleyball	V, JV	Fall	Girls'
Wrestling	V, JV	Winter	Boys'

- V = Varsity, JV = Junior varsity

==== GHSA state championships ====
- Baseball - 2008
- Golf - 2007 (girls')
- Softball - 2002
- Cross country - 1980, 1982, 1986, 1989-91 (boys'); 1984, 1986-87 (girls')

==== GHSA Class A Region Championships ====
2011 Pacelli football helmet design

- Baseball - 1983, 1984, 1991, 1993, 2001, 2002, 2006, 2008
- Cheerleading - 2002
- Cross country - 2002, 2004, 2007, 2010, 2011, 2012 (girls'); 1979–82, 1986, 1989–91, 2002 (boys')
- Football - 1970, 1975, 2003, 2004
- Golf - 2006 (boys'), 2008 (girls')
- Soccer - 1990, 1997, 2003, 2008, 2009, 2016, 2017, 2018 (boys'); 1998 (girls')
- Softball - 2003, 2004, 2008, 2012
- Tennis - 1993 (boys')
- Track - 2008 (girls')
- Boys Basketball -2021 (Boys’)

==== Pacelli-Brookstone rivalry ====
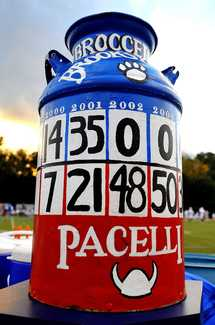
Pacelli has played Brookstone in football since 1972 for this red and blue milk jug.

Pacelli's biggest rival is Brookstone High School, located in North Columbus (8 miles (13 km) north of Pacelli's Midtown campus). Although Pacelli plays Brookstone in all of their sports, the most popular rivalry is their yearly football game, dubbed the "Battle for the Jug". The winner of this game gets to keep the "Broocelli Jug" (a milk jug painted red and blue) at their campus for the next year, along with bragging rights. In 2013, Pacelli received the jug for the first time since 2004 in a 14–7 win. The rivalry first began in 1972, and Brookstone leads the series 27–17–1.

=== Clubs and organizations ===
Pacelli bell tower, located at the campus' north entrance

Pacelli features student-led clubs and organizations. They include the following:

- Drama Club
- Empty Bowl Club
- Green Team
- Literary Team
- Math Team
- Pep Club
- Pro-Life Club
- Prom Committee
- Rotary Interact Club
- SKALD Yearbook Club
- Student Ambassadors
- Student Council

== Notable alumni ==
- Donna D'Errico, actress and model
- Mark LeGree, professional football player

== See also ==
- National Catholic Educational Association
