= Downtown Columbus =

Downtown Columbus may refer to:

- Downtown Columbus, Ohio
- Downtown Columbus, Georgia
