= Cancer insurance =

Type of supplemental health insurance

Cancer insurance is a type of supplemental health insurance that is meant to manage the risks associated with the cancer disease and its numerous manifestations. Cancer insurance is a relatively new trend within the insurance industry. It is meant to mitigate the costs of cancer treatment and provide policyholders with a degree of financial support. This support is based upon the terms written into a particular policy by an insurance company. As with other forms of insurance, cancer insurance is subject to charges, called premiums, which change depending on the risk associated with covering the disease.

== History ==
In terms of the insurance industry, cancer insurance is a novel form of coverage, having emerged approximately 50 years ago. This coverage was created by insurers like the American Heritage Life Insurance Company and Aflac to meet demand coming from those suffering from the disease. Cancer insurance was not designed to replace conventional health insurance coverage. Instead, this type of insurance is meant to augment conventional policies by providing coverage for a disease that is often associated with high out-of-pocket medical costs, even when coverage is provided through traditional insurance policies.

== Types of Policies ==
Most cancer policies fall into two distinct types of plans: Scheduled benefits policies and lump sum policies.

=== Scheduled Benefits Policy ===
A scheduled benefit cancer policy usually has a long list of specific benefits that it will cover up to a certain amount. The benefit amounts in a single policy can vary wildly depending on what exactly the benefit is for. A policy will almost always cover hospital stays, standard cancer treatments, as well as transportation and lodging to and from an oncology specialist.

For example, a scheduled benefit policy may offer a benefit of $20,000 for chemotherapy treatment, but a much smaller allowance for transportation to and from a specialist, as well as lodging for the patient and their family.

A policy may also offer an upfront cash benefit paid once a patient receives a positive diagnosis from a medical provider.

These policies can be offered as a part of a group plan through an employer, or you also have the option to purchase them individually through an agent or directly from the insurance company.

=== Lump Sum Policy ===
A lump sum cancer policy, also commonly referred to as a cancer indemnity policy, will usually pay out a single amount upon a positive diagnosis. Most policies offered start at $5,000 in coverage and can go as high as $100,000 in coverage.

These types of policies are generally available for adults of all ages and usually require very few medical questions in order to qualify. Most companies allow cancer survivors to enroll in a plan as long as they have been certified cancer-free for between 5-10 years.

In the United States, the benefits paid out in either a lump sum policy or scheduled benefits policy may not be taxable, depending on whether you or your employer paid for them, and whether they were paid for with pre-tax or post-tax dollars.

== Coverage benefits ==
Cancer insurance policies typically offer wellness benefits (varies from state to state) that are meant to help those suffering from cancer or at risk of developing the disease adopt healthier lifestyles. These benefits vary depending on the insurance company providing coverage. These benefits can offer financial support for those pursuing healthy living programs, such as tobacco cessation, gym memberships, and dietary changes. Insurers may also offer access to information regarding healthy lifestyles, which policyholders can acquire at any time. Typical coverage benefits also provide policyholders with access to wellness tests that are meant for the early detection of disease and monitoring of other aspects of overall health. These tests include mammograms, Pap smear tests, and colonoscopies as well as many others. In many cases, those with cancer insurance must submit proof that they have received an exam to their cancer insurance provider. This matter is typically handled by the medical professional conducting the exam. Once the evidence of the exam has been submitted and verified, the insurance company will then provide the necessary financial support. As a supplement to traditional health insurance policies, cancer insurance and its associated benefits, are limited in scope. The benefits associated with these policies are often designed to mitigate the effects of cancer or encourage the prevention of the disease as a whole. Benefits come in different varieties depending upon the insurance company underwriting the policies. Many policies offer benefits concerning medical expenses, which include costs associated with health care, such as cancer treatment. Other policies offer benefits concerning non-medical costs. These benefits provide policyholders with financial assistance for transportation, food, home and child care, and certain bills.

== Coverage limitations ==
=== Limited coverage of skin cancers ===
Skin cancer is the most commonly diagnosed form of cancer. The primary categories of skin cancer are basal-cell carcinoma (BCC), squamous-cell carcinoma (SCC), and melanoma. The first two, collectively known as non-melanoma skin cancers (NMSC), are highly unlikely to metastasize and comprise the majority of skin cancer diagnoses.

Many cancer insurance plans do not offer benefits for policyholders diagnosed with these non-melanoma skin cancers, or a large share of cases that are frequently called cancer. Other plans that provide both initial-diagnosis payments and recurring payments may not provide a lump-sum benefit for the initial diagnosis of a non-melanoma skin cancer.

=== Limited range of covered illnesses ===
Some cancer insurance plans cover only those costs associated with cancer itself. Under these plans, costs associated with any non-cancer illness that was directly or indirectly induced or complicated by cancer are not covered. For example, even though lung cancer increases the risk of pneumonia, medical costs related to treatment of pneumonia that occurs after a cancer diagnosis would not be covered by a cancer insurance plan.

Other cancer insurance plans may only cover costs that arise after a patient has developed cancer properly. Policyholders do not receive benefits if they are detected with pre-malignant symptoms or other conditions that show the potential for malignancy.

=== Limitations on outpatient treatment ===
Some cancer insurance plans only cover costs related to inpatient care, even though some forms of treatment may require outpatient care. Under these plans, cancer treatment given to a patient after they have left a hospital, including radiation and chemotherapy, may not be covered.

=== Pre-existing conditions ===
While cancer insurance plans have varying definitions of pre-existing conditions, they generally agree in that they impose restrictions on individuals who have already been diagnosed with cancer at the time of enrollment. Some plans may not provide benefits for costs incurred due to a pre-existing condition during the first twelve months of coverage. Other plans may render patients completely ineligible if they have ever been diagnosed with certain forms of cancer, AIDS, or HIV.

=== Limitations on double coverage ===
Cancer insurance is a form of supplemental insurance that is meant to cover gaps in a patient's primary insurance plans, but in some instances, primary insurance plans provide cancer coverage benefits that overlap with those of the supplemental cancer insurance plan. While some cancer insurance plans will pay benefits no matter what the primary insurance plan pays, some primary insurance plans may include a coordination of benefits clause that prohibits double payment. Other cancer insurance plans may stipulate that patients cannot receive double benefits.

=== Coverage waiting periods ===
Some cancer insurance plans have provisions that prevent the policyholder from receiving benefits during a period after initial enrollment; this length is frequently thirty days. Some plans stipulate that if a policyholder is diagnosed with cancer in the first thirty days of coverage, their benefits are significantly reduced and coverage will subsequently be terminated.

== Concerns regarding coverage ==
Health insurance eligibility is often subject to the risk management and appraisal practices of insurance companies. Because of the risks posed by serious health issues, such as cancer, companies often take a strong stance against providing new coverage to those with the disease. As such, typical health insurance policies do not offer coverage for cancer. In these cases, supplemental insurance policies, such as those designed to cover cancer specifically, can be useful. In the U.S., changes to healthcare laws have made it possible for those with pre-existing medical conditions to obtain insurance coverage. The Affordable Care Act, the law that has presented these changes, has required health insurance companies in the country to offer coverage to those suffering from conditions such as cancer. Though the law stipulates that these people must be granted access to health insurance, insurance policies are subject to the whims of the companies that underwrite them. As such, the provisions of these policies can vary dramatically depending on the health insurance company involved. In some cases, insurers design their policies to be financially unattractive to those suffering from costly medical conditions.

As a supplemental health insurance plan, cancer insurance policies are meant to close the gaps left behind by conventional insurance policies. Even so, these plans may not provide coverage for the full extent of health issues related to the disease. Complications concerning the disease can have a tremendous effect on the availability of cancer insurance policies. One of the primary concerns regarding cancer insurance coverage is eligibility. Typically, those with pre-existing medical conditions such as cancer, are not eligible for the coverage. The factors that determine eligibility vary from insurer to insurer.
