= Aflac Building =

Skyscraper in Columbus, Georgia, United States

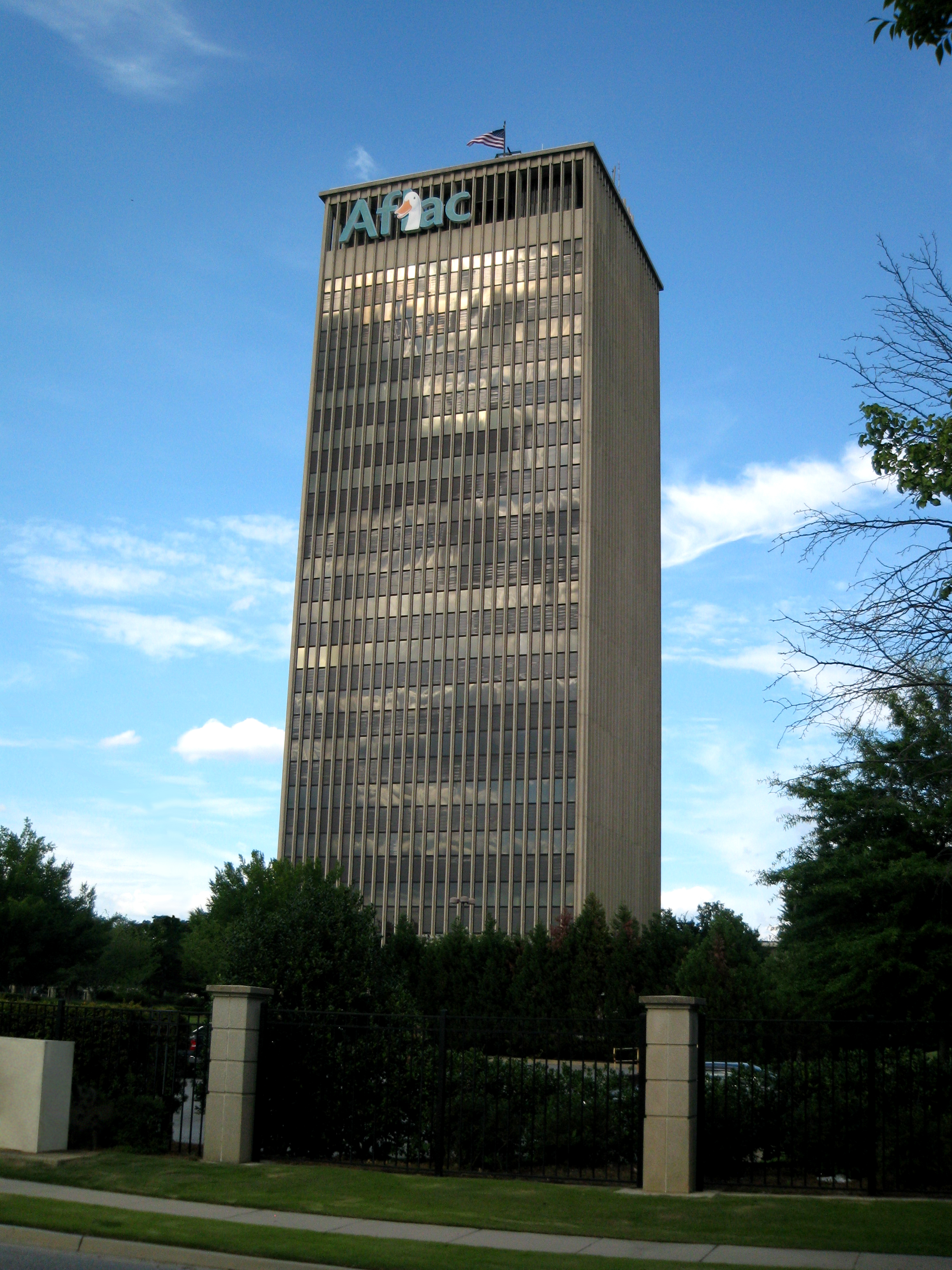
- Aflac Building (2012)
- Interactive map of the Aflac Building area

General information
- Type: Office
- Location: 1932 Wynnton Road, Columbus, Georgia, United States
- Coordinates: 32.468°N 84.964°W
- Completed: December 1974 – December 1975

Height
- Antenna spire: 13 ft
- Roof: 278 ft (85 m)
- Top floor: unknown

Technical details
- Floor count: 19

Design and construction
- Architects: Hecht Burdeshaw Architects, Inc.

The Aflac Building is a high-rise office building located in Columbus, Georgia. Its construction was ordered in late November 1974, the groundbreaking ceremony took place January 4, 1975, and the tower was completed and occupied on December 19, 1975. The tower is the tallest building in the city and the U.S. state of Georgia outside of the Atlanta Metropolitan Area, Savannah, and Augusta. It is located about 1 mile (1.6 km) east of downtown. The building is 278 feet (85 m) tall. It serves as the headquarters for Aflac, an insurance company. The tower was part of a period of modernization for the Downtown Columbus area along with the Columbus Consolidated Government Center built a year earlier.

== History ==
Its construction was ordered in late November 1974, the groundbreaking ceremony took place January 4, 1975, and the tower was completed and occupied on December 19, 1975. The Aflac Building has been adorned with a lighting display in the shape of a Christmas tree every Christmas since 1981.
