= Dan Amos =

American business executive (born 1951)

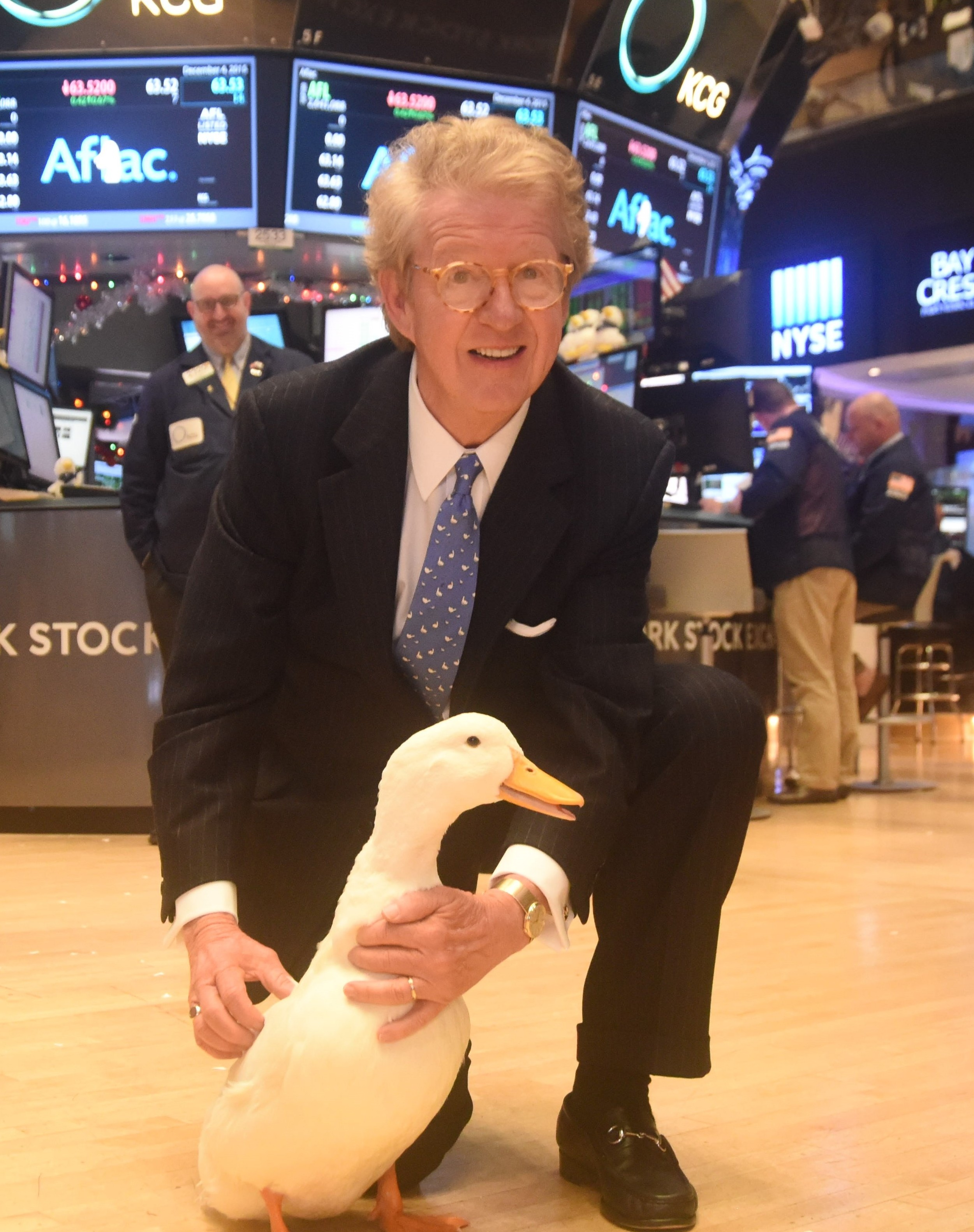
- Dan Amos with the Aflac Duck, NYSE 2018
- Born: Daniel Paul Amos; August 13, 1951 (age 75); Pensacola, Florida, U.S.
- Education: University of Georgia (BA)
- Occupations: Chairman and Chief executive officer of Aflac
- Children: Lauren Amos and Paul Amos II

Daniel Paul Amos (born August 13, 1951) is an American business executive. He serves as the chairman and chief executive officer of Aflac Incorporated.

== Early life ==
Daniel Amos was born on August 13, 1951, in Pensacola, Florida. He is the son of Aflac co-founder Paul Amos.

Amos graduated from the University of Georgia, where he received a bachelor's degree with a focus on risk management in insurance and was a member of the Sigma Nu fraternity. He served as UGA class president for the class of 1973.

== Career ==
Amos joined Aflac in 1973, working in sales for 10 years, during which time, he was the company's top salesperson. He was named president of Aflac in 1983, chief operating officer in 1987, chief executive officer of Aflac Incorporated in 1990 and chair in 2001.

During Mr. Amos's tenure as CEO, revenues at Aflac have grown from $2.7 billion in 1990 to $17.2 billion as of December 31, 2025.

In 2000, Amos was the architect of the Aflac Duck advertising campaign.

In 2008, Aflac became the first major U.S. firm to voluntarily afford shareholders an advisory vote on executive pay packages, including that of the CEO. Shareholders supported the company's executive compensation packages annually from 2008 to 2026.

Amos also served as chairman of the Building Terry campaign at the University of Georgia that set out to raise $90 million to bring the business college up to speed with its competitors, not only with money for bricks and mortar but also for faculty, programs and students. The campaign far exceeded that goal raising more than $121 million.

He previously served as a member of the Consumer Affairs Advisory Committee of the Securities and Exchange Commission.

Following the retirement of Warren Buffett, on January 1, 2026, Dan Amos became the longest tenured CEO in the Fortune 250.

== Philanthropy ==
A past member of the board of trustees of Children's Healthcare of Atlanta, Dan serves on the board of the House of Mercy of Columbus, Georgia. He is former chair of the board of the Japan-America Society of Georgia and chair emeritus of the University of Georgia Foundation.

Amos is responsible for Aflac’s 31 year, $200+ million sponsorship of the Aflac Cancer and Blood Disorders Center of Children’s Healthcare of Atlanta, ranked among the top children’s cancer facilities in the U.S. according to U.S. News and World Report.

== Honors ==
In 2023, he was inducted as a Georgia Trustee, an honor given by the Georgia Historical Society in conjunction with the Governor of Georgia to individuals whose accomplishments and community service reflect the ideals of the founding body of Trustees, which governed the Georgia colony from 1732 to 1752.

Amos was also the recipient of the MLK Jr. Center Salute to Greatness award in 2013 and the Dr. Martin Luther King Jr. Unity Award and the Torch of Liberty Award from the Anti-Defamation League. He was named as one of America’s Best CEOs by Institutional Investor magazine five times.
