= Linda Kaplan Thaler =

American advertiser and author

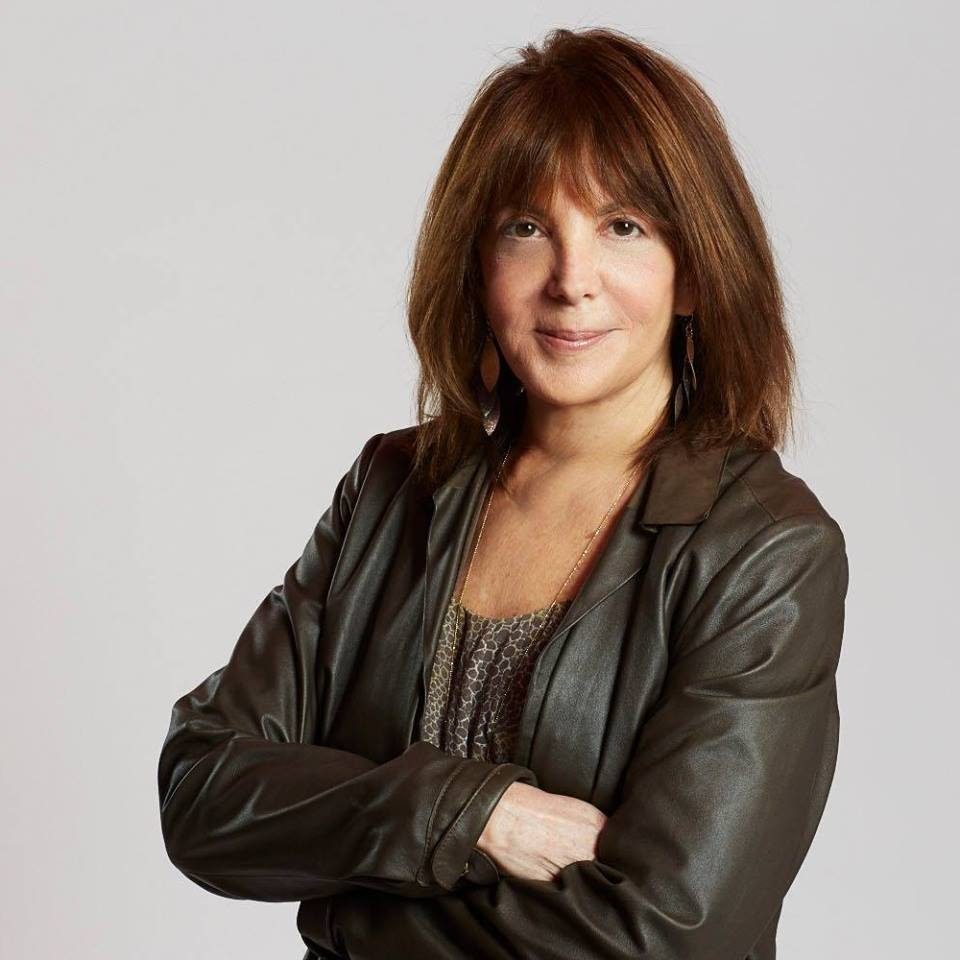
- Born: Linda Kaplan; January 1951 (age 74–75)
- Education: B.S. and M.M.A. CCNY
- Occupation: Advertising
- Spouse: Fred Thaler

Linda Kaplan Thaler (January, 1951) is an American advertiser and author. She is currently the CEO & President of Kaplan Thaler Productions. As an advertiser she helped create advertising campaigns that are well known in American culture including the Aflac duck and the “Yes, Yes, Yes” campaign for Clairol Herbal Essence. She has authored and composed jingles, including “I Don’t Wanna Grow Up, I’m a Toys "R" Us Kid,” and “Kodak Moments". She is a motivational speaker at businesses and colleges.

== Education and career ==
Born to a Jewish family and raised in New York City, Kaplan Thaler graduated from The Bronx High School of Science in 1968. She studied at CCNY, earning a BS in psychology and later a Master of Music from the same institution. She is a member of the Phi Beta Kappa honors society.

She spent 17 years of her early career at J. Walter Thompson where she was a Senior Vice President, then went to Wells Rich Greene as Executive Vice President and Executive Creative Director.

She founded the Kaplan Thaler Group in 1997 and worked as the CEO and Chief Creative officer for it. She later renamed the Kaplan Thaler Group to Kaplan Thaler Productions. Here she created the Aflac duck and the daring “Yes, Yes, Yes” campaign for Clairol Herbal Essences. She has authored and composed jingles that are among the industry's gold standard, including “I Don’t Wanna Grow Up, I’m a Toys ‘R’ Us Kid,” and “Kodak Moments.”

She has also worked on several political campaigns, including presidential runs for Bill Clinton and Al Gore in 1992 and Hillary Clinton in 2008, as well as Bill Bradley in 2000.

Kaplan Thaler served as chairman of Publicis New York until 2016. She is married to composer Fred Thaler.

== Television ==
Kaplan Thaler has appeared on The Apprentice, Good Morning America, TODAY, CNN and Fox News. She hosted the Oxygen television series, “Making It Big” and was a judge on the Mark Burnett reality series, “Jingles."

== Achievements ==
In 2015, Kaplan Thaler was inducted into the American Advertising Hall of Fame. She is also the recipient of the 2016 Clio Lifetime Achievement Award. She was also the first woman in advertising to receive the New York Women in Film and Television's Muse Award. In 2010/2011, Kaplan Thaler served as the New York Women in Communications' President. As of 2012, she sits on the Advisory Council for The Colin Powell Center at CCNY.

== Publications ==
- Bang! Getting Your Message Heard in a Noisy World. Random House. 2003.
- The Power of Nice: How to Conquer the Business World with Kindness. Random House. 2006.
- The Power of Small: Why Little Things Make All the Difference. Doubleday. 2009.
- Grit to Great: How Perseverance Passion and Pluck Take You from Ordinary to Extraordinary. Random House. 2015.
