= Mark LeGree =

American football player (born 1989)

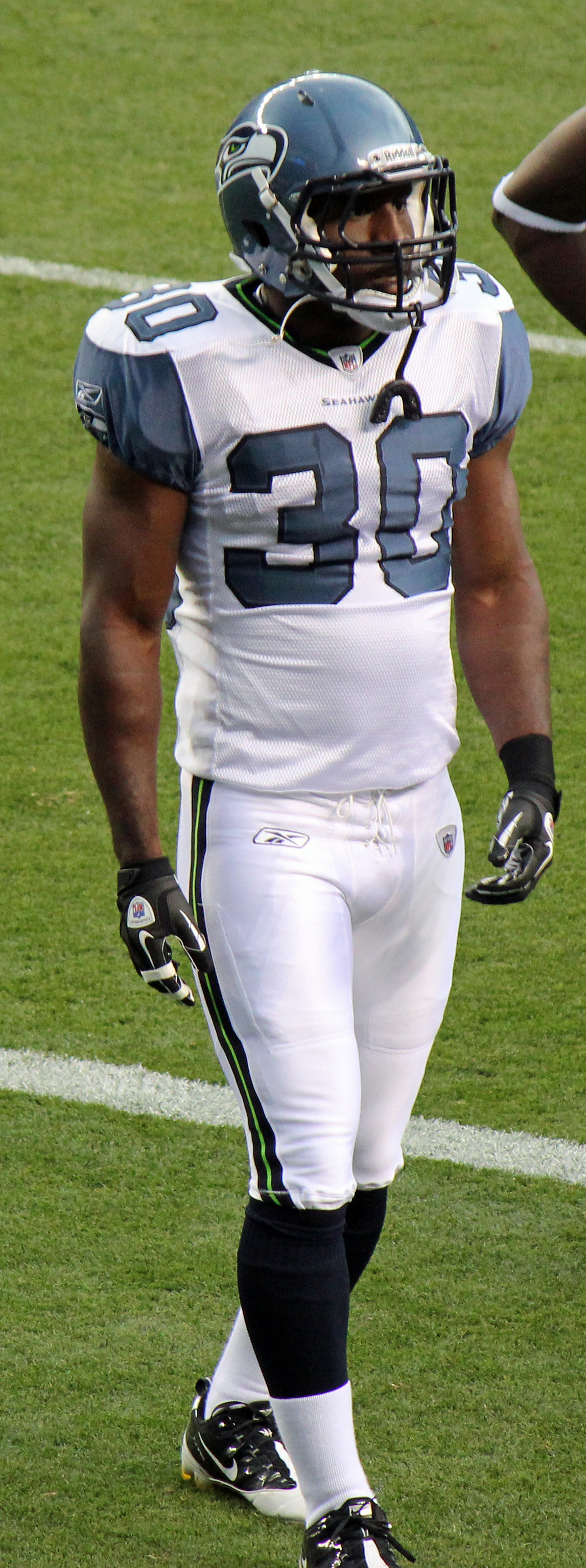
- LeGree with the Seattle Seahawks in 2011

No. 28
- Position: Safety

Personal information
- Born: July 8, 1989 (age 37); St. Helena Island, South Carolina, U.S.
- Listed height: 6 ft 0 in (1.83 m)
- Listed weight: 210 lb (95 kg)

Career information
- High school: Pacelli (Columbus, Georgia)
- College: Appalachian State (2007–2010)
- NFL draft: 2011: 5th round, 156th overall pick

Career history
- Seattle Seahawks (2011)*; Arizona Cardinals (2011)*; San Francisco 49ers (2011)*; New York Jets (2011)*; San Francisco 49ers (2012)*; Chicago Bears (2012)*; Atlanta Falcons (2012)*; Buffalo Bills (2013)*; Saskatchewan Roughriders (2014–2015)
- * Offseason or practice squad member only

Awards and highlights
- NCAA FCS national champion (2007)
- Stats at Pro Football Reference

Mark DeAndre' LeGree (born July 8, 1989) is an American former professional football safety. He was selected by the Seattle Seahawks in the fifth round of the 2011 NFL draft. He played collegiately with the Appalachian State University Mountaineers.

LeGree was also a member of the Arizona Cardinals, San Francisco 49ers, New York Jets, Chicago Bears, Atlanta Falcons, Buffalo Bills and Saskatchewan Roughriders.

== Early life ==
LeGree was born on St. Helena Island, South Carolina. His sister is Naya Tapper, rugby player and Olympic bronze medalist.

LeGree played high school football at Pacelli High School in Columbus, Georgia, one of the smallest high schools in the state.

== College career ==
Despite LeGree's all-state status in high school, he was not highly recruited at the college level. LeGree's offer to play at Appalachian State came only after he sent the school a video tape of his high school play.

LeGree was a three-time All-American in NCAA Division I Football Championship (Division I-AA) at Appalachian State. He intercepted 10 passes in 2008 and 7 in 2009 and 5 in 2010. LeGree amassed many awards and became one of the most highly decorated players to come out of Appalachian State. LeGree currently holds records for total career interceptions and most interceptions in a season.

== Professional career ==
Pre-draft measurables
Height	Weight	Arm length	Hand span	40-yard dash	10-yard split	20-yard split	20-yard shuttle	Three-cone drill	Vertical jump	Broad jump	Bench press
5 ft 11 1/2 in (1.82 m)	210 lb (95 kg)	30 1/4 in (0.77 m)	9 1/4 in (0.23 m)	4.59 s	1.63 s	2.69 s	4.09 s	6.90 s	31.0 in (0.79 m)	9 ft 8 in (2.95 m)	21 reps
All values from NFL Combine

LeGree was selected by the Seattle Seahawks with the 25th pick in the fifth round of the 2011 NFL draft. The Seahawks were the only team to bring him in for a formal visit during the recruiting process. Due to the NFL labor dispute, LeGree attained a job working for a general contractor until the dispute was resolved.

LeGree was signed to the Arizona Cardinals' practice squad on September 21, 2011. He was released on October 5.

LeGree was signed to the San Francisco 49ers' practice squad on November 15, 2011. He was released on November 29.

LeGree was signed to the New York Jets' practice squad on December 13, 2011.

The 49ers signed LeGree to a reserve/future contract on January 24, 2012. He was waived on August 11, 2012.

LeGree was signed by the Chicago Bears on August 20, 2012. He was waived on August 31.

The Atlanta Falcons signed LeGree to the practice squad on September 2, 2012.

On August 7, 2013, LeGree was signed by the Buffalo Bills. On August 18, 2013, he was released by the Bills.

LeGree signed with the Saskatchewan Roughriders on March 18, 2014. He dressed in 14 games in 2014. He dressed in four games, starting two, in 2015. LeGree was cut September 15, 2015.
