= Church of the Holy Family (Columbus, Georgia) =

Historic church in Georgia, United States

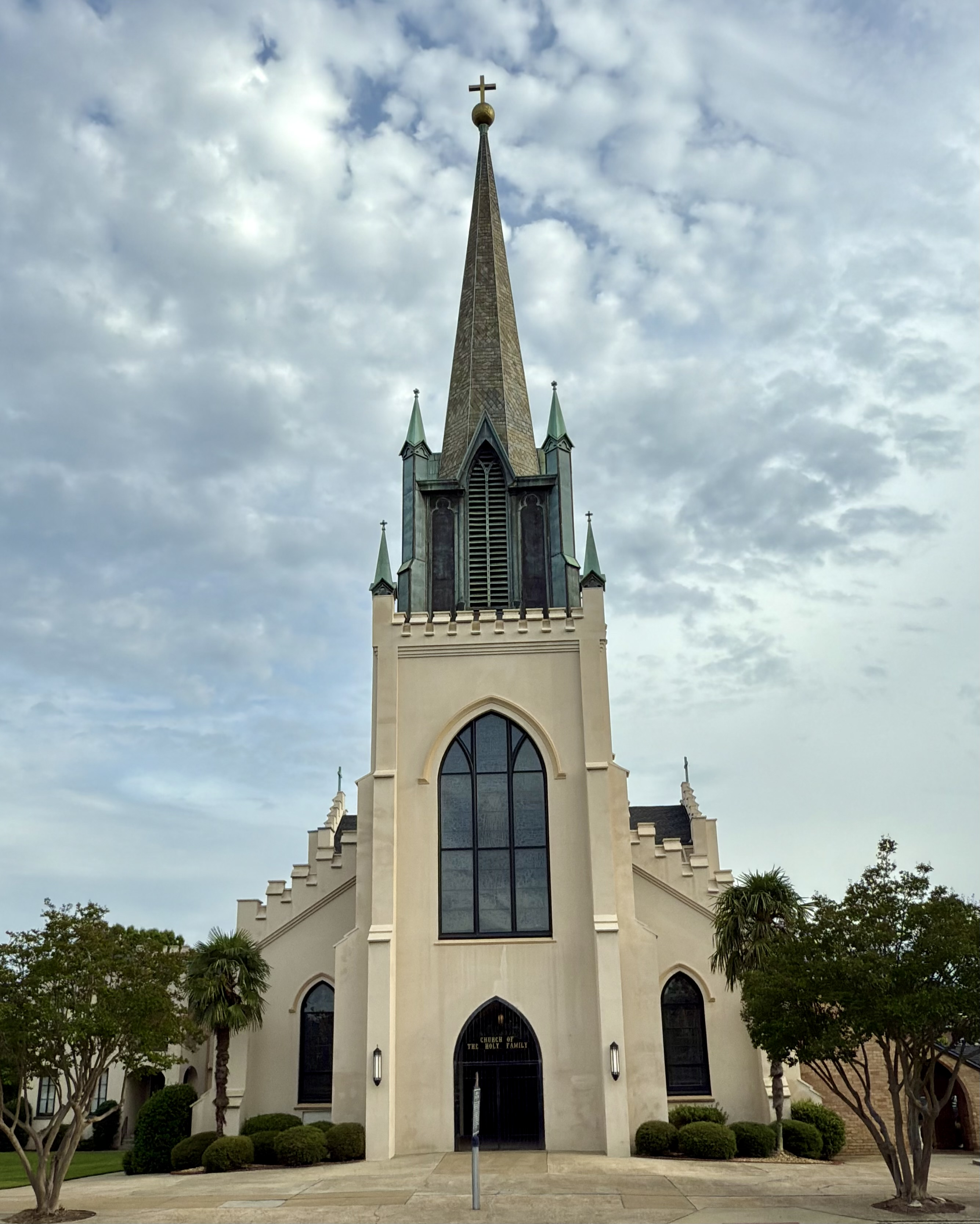
- Church of the Holy Family
- Location: 320 12th Street, Columbus GA 31901
- Country: United States
- Denomination: Roman Catholic
- Website: Official website

Architecture
- Style: Gothic Revival
- Years built: 1877; 149 years ago

Administration
- Diocese: Savannah

Clergy
- Pastor: Father Ben Dallas
- Church of the Holy Family
- U.S. National Register of Historic Places
- Coordinates: 32°28′6″N 84°59′18″W
- Built: 1877; 149 years ago
- Architect: Daniel Matthew Foley
- Architectural style: Gothic Revival
- MPS: Columbus MRA
- NRHP reference No.: 80001152
- Added to NRHP: September 29, 1980

The Church of the Holy Family is a Catholic Church located in Downtown Columbus, Georgia that was built in 1880. The Catholic church in Columbus had outgrown its original church built in 1829.

The church's architect/builder, Daniel Matthew Foley, had designed 16 other churches before coming to Columbus to design this church. It is the only Gothic Revival church in Columbus and "is an architectural as well as religious anchor point in the community."

It was added to the National Register of Historic Places in 1980.

It was listed on the National Register along with other historic properties identified in a large survey.

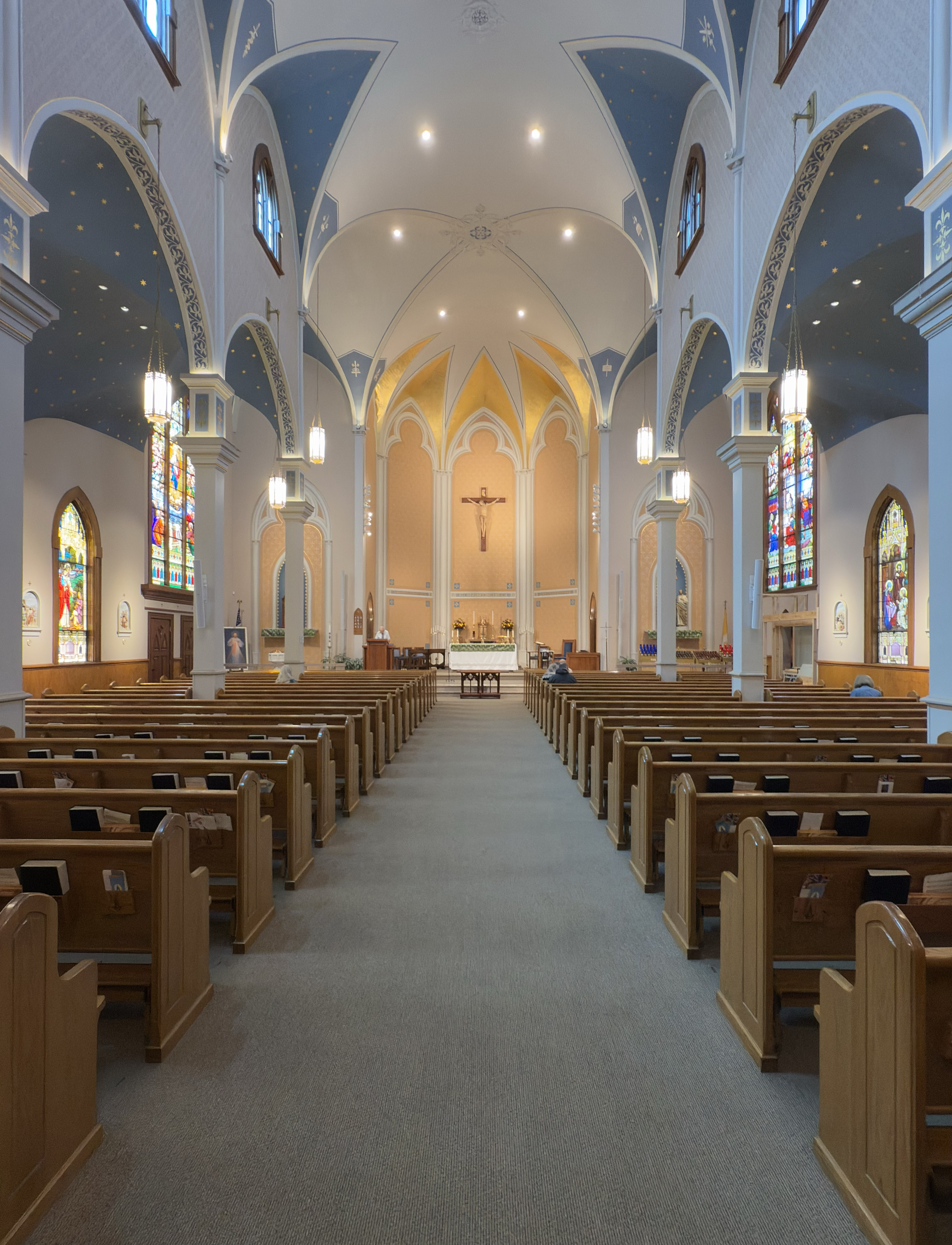
View up the nave toward the altar

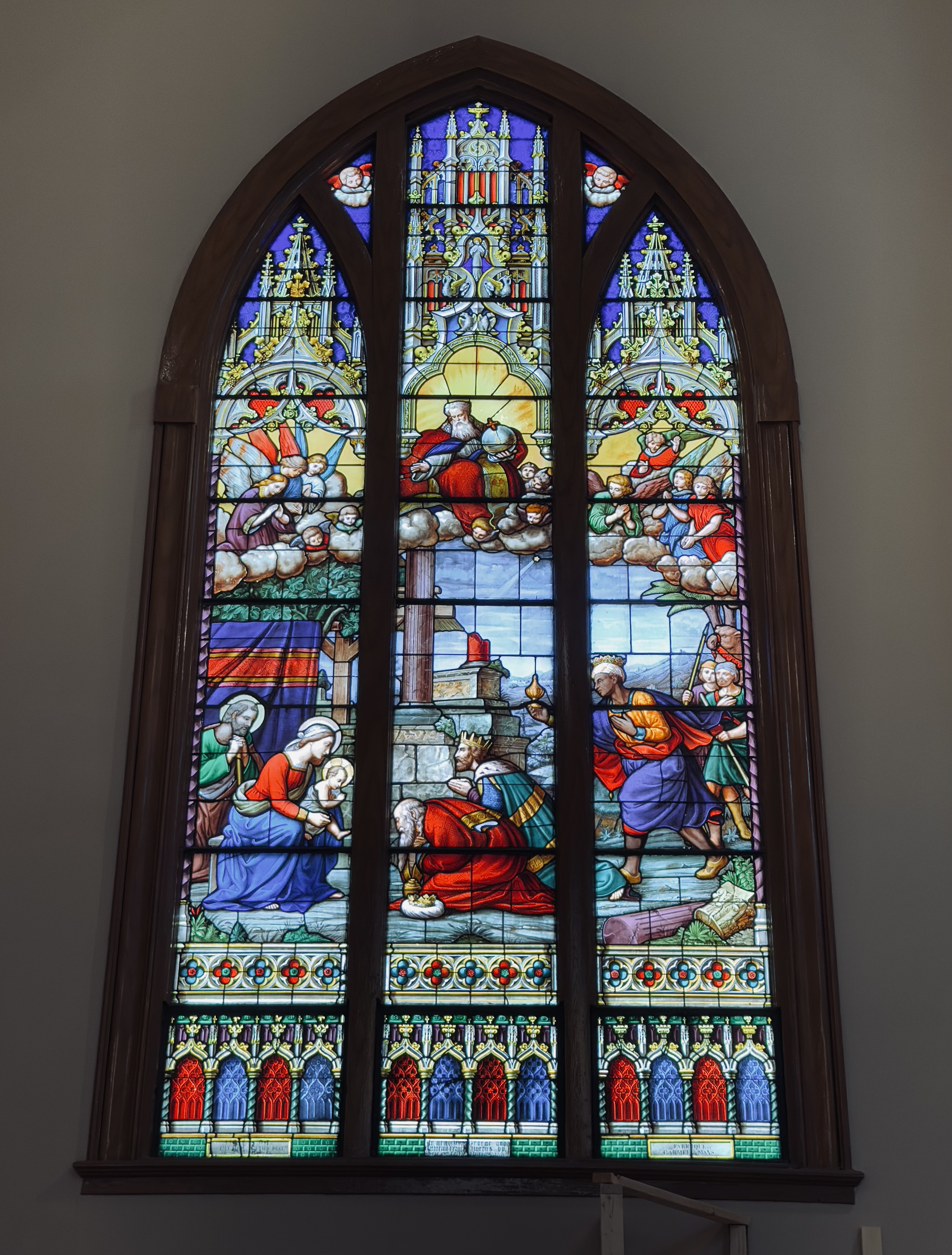
One of the stained glass window

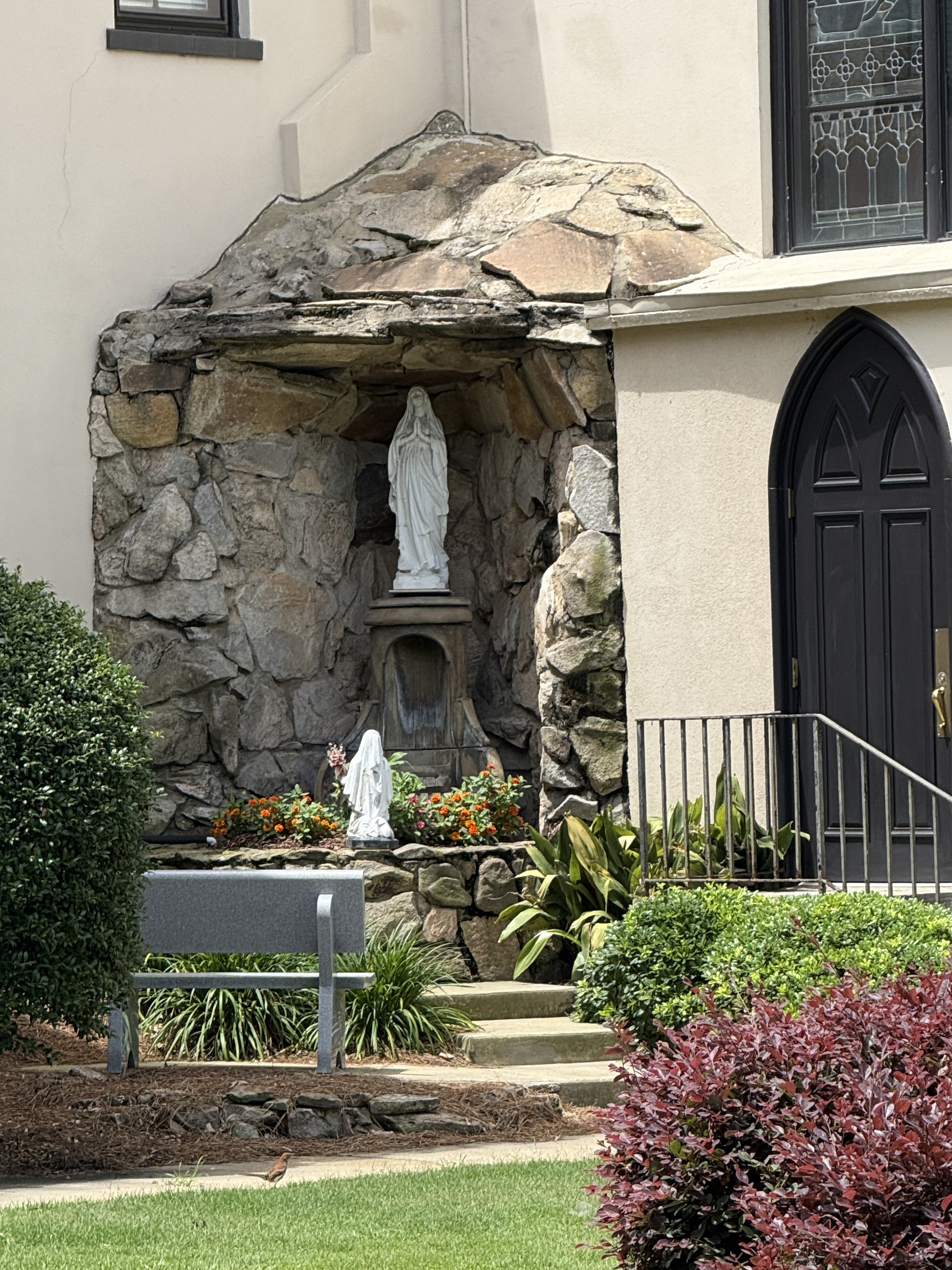
Lourdes grotto

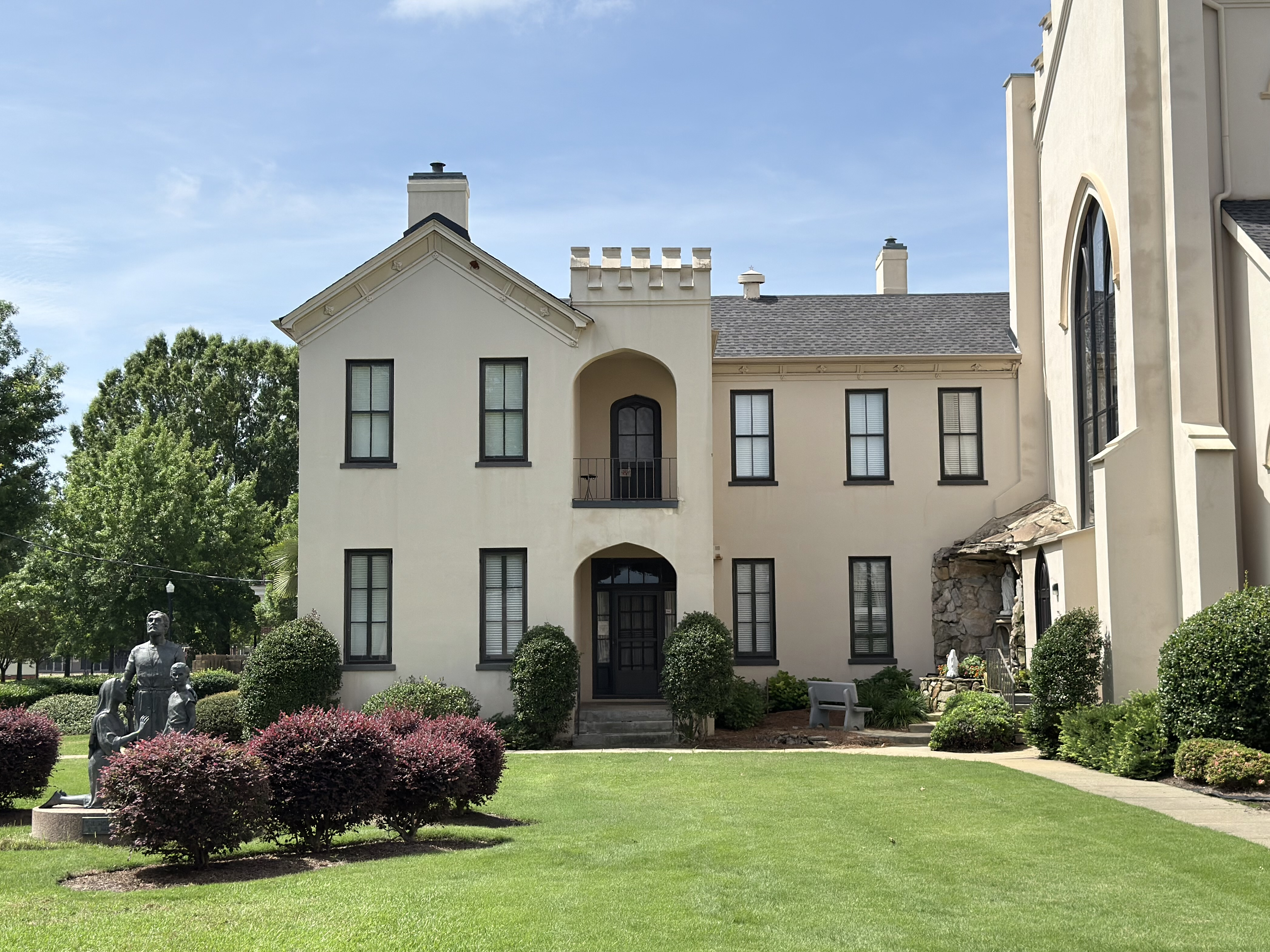
Rectory

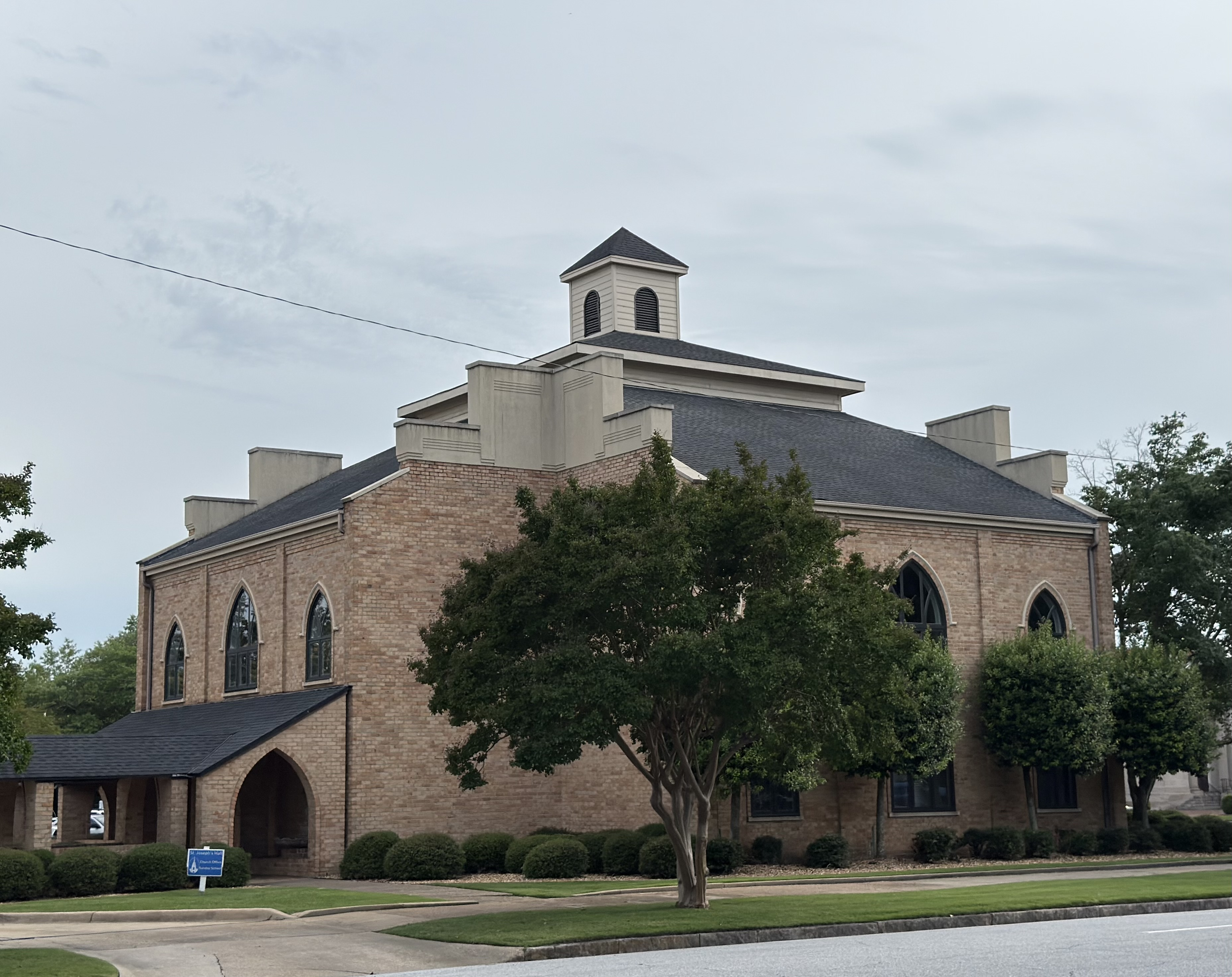
St. Joseph’s Hall

== See also ==
- National Register of Historic Places listings in Muscogee County, Georgia
