= Ralston Towers =

- Location: Columbus, Georgia, U.S.
- Built: 1914

U.S. National Register of Historic Places
- Designated: 1979

Ralston Towers is a historic residential building in Columbus, Georgia, known for its transition from a prominent hotel to a low-income housing complex, its subsequent decline, and its recent redevelopment. The building has been listed on the National Register of Historic Places since 1979, and in 2024, it was added to the Georgia Register of Historic Places.

== History ==
=== Early Years as a Hotel ===
Constructed in 1914, Ralston Towers originally opened as the only hotel in downtown Columbus. It was the tallest building in Columbus at the time, with 100 rooms on nine floors, facing the First Baptist Church.

Over the years, the building underwent three additional expansions, making it one of the most significant structures in Uptown Columbus. Recognizing its historical and architectural significance, the building was added to the National Register of Historic Places in 1979.

=== Transition to Affordable Housing ===
In 1975, the building underwent a major transformation from a hotel into a residential facility, primarily aimed at senior citizens. Over time, it became a low-income housing complex under the U.S. Department of Housing and Urban Development’s (HUD) Project-Based Section 8 program, serving elderly and disabled residents in downtown Columbus.

== Decline and Safety Concerns ==
=== Maintenance Issues ===
In the years leading up to 2019, Ralston Towers faced severe neglect, with numerous reports of poor living conditions. Tenants frequently complained about maintenance deficiencies, pest infestations, and health hazards, prompting concerns about the building’s livability.

=== Tragedies and Investigations ===
A Ralston Towers resident died from heat-related conditions in 2016, according to the coroner’s office. In the summer of 2019, the building was deemed unlivable due to multiple HUD violations, leading to its closure.

Subsequent inspections by HUD revealed significant deficiencies. In October 2019, Ralston Towers received a failing score of 30 out of 100, well below HUD’s passing threshold of 60. As a result, HUD terminated its contract with the property, forcing the relocation of over 200 residents. The building officially shut down in August 2020.

Following a $125 million wrongful death lawsuit, efforts were made to address the substandard conditions at the property. Columbus Mayor Skip Henderson reached out to U.S. Representative Sanford Bishop to evaluate the ongoing problems at the facility. Bishop then contacted U.S. Department of Housing and Urban Development (HUD) Secretary Ben Carson, who confirmed that Ralston Towers had been transferred to a new owner.

== Acquisition and Redevelopment ==
In June 2021, Infinity Capital Partners, an Atlanta-based real estate firm, acquired Ralston Towers with plans for a full-scale redevelopment. The project received $10 million for a full-interior demolition and extensive redevelopment. The renovation aimed to modernize the building while preserving its historical significance, including upgrading mechanical, electrical, and plumbing systems.

== Reopening and Current Status ==
By August 2023, Ralston Towers received a certificate of occupancy from the city of Columbus, marking its readiness for reopening. The revitalized building now offers 224 subsidized units and 45 non-government subsidized apartments. The first 80 units became available immediately, with the remaining units completed by the end of the year.

The new Ralston Towers features a dining hall, a full laundry facility, and a computer room on the first floor. There are 64 security cameras throughout the public areas of the building and outside, providing another layer of security for residents. The grand opening took place on August 30, 2023, with special guests including Congressman Sanford Bishop.

In 2024, Ralston Towers was added to the Georgia Register of Historic Places.
