= Downtown Columbus, Georgia =

Neighborhood in Columbus, Georgia, U.S.

Coordinates: 32.48155°N 84.90985°W

Downtown Columbus
- Neighborhood
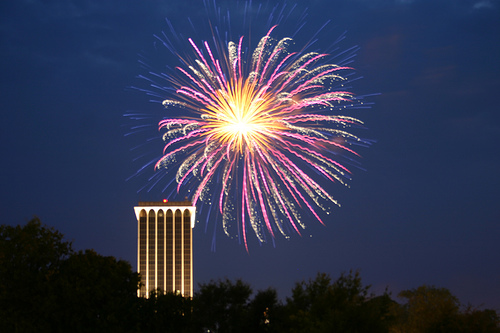
- Fireworks in Downtown on July 4, 2009.
- Interactive map of Downtown Columbus
- Country: United States
- State: Georgia
- County: Muscogee
- City: Columbus

Population (2007)
  - Total: 8,080
- ZIP codes: 31901, 31902, 31908, 31993, 31997, 31998

Downtown Columbus, Georgia, also called "Uptown" (see here), is the central business district of the city of Columbus, Georgia. The commercial and governmental heart of the city has traditionally been toward the eastern end of Downtown Columbus, between 10th Street and 1st Avenue. Recent developments, particularly between Broadway and 2nd Avenue, have expanded the boundaries of the "central" part of the neighborhood. The term "Downtown Columbus" can also mean this smaller, more commercial area, particularly when used in the context of the city's nightlife and restaurants.

South of Broadway is a much more residential area, characterized by historic homes, new infill construction, and some public housing. This part of Downtown Columbus has the highest concentration of hotels, particularly along Front Avenue, and the Broadway commercial corridor is the center of business.

== Overview ==
Buildings

The following is a list of the tallest buildings in Downtown Columbus.

#	Name	Picture	Height (ft)	Stories	Year	Notes
1	Aflac Building		246	19	1975	Aflac HQ is the tallest building outside of Atlanta in the state of Georgia
2	Columbus Consolidated Government Center		235	13	1973	To be demolished in 2027
3	The Ralston Addition			11	1977	
4	Corporate Center		129	10	1973	
5	The Ralston Addition		110	10	1919	
6	The Ralston Addition			9	1941	
7	The Ralston		106	9	1914	
8	Piedmont Columbus Regional		≈110	9	1968	
9	Muscogee County Jail North Tower			8	1984	
10	Columbus Marriott			8	1982	
11	Muscogee County Jail South Tower			7	2002	
12	Hotel Indigo			7	2021	Built along the river. Has 107 hotel rooms and features the rooftop bar eighteen85
13	1601 First Avenue			6	1999	
14	AC Hotel by Marriott Columbus			6	2021	

=== Historic places ===
Two Historic Districts are located in the main district of downtown: the Columbus Historic District and the Columbus Historic Riverfront Industrial District Structures listed in the National Register of Historic Places include Columbus Ironworks, the former Ledger-Enquirer Tower, and the YMCA. The Columbus Battlefield spans across the Chattahoochee River in the location of Mott's Green.

=== Homes ===
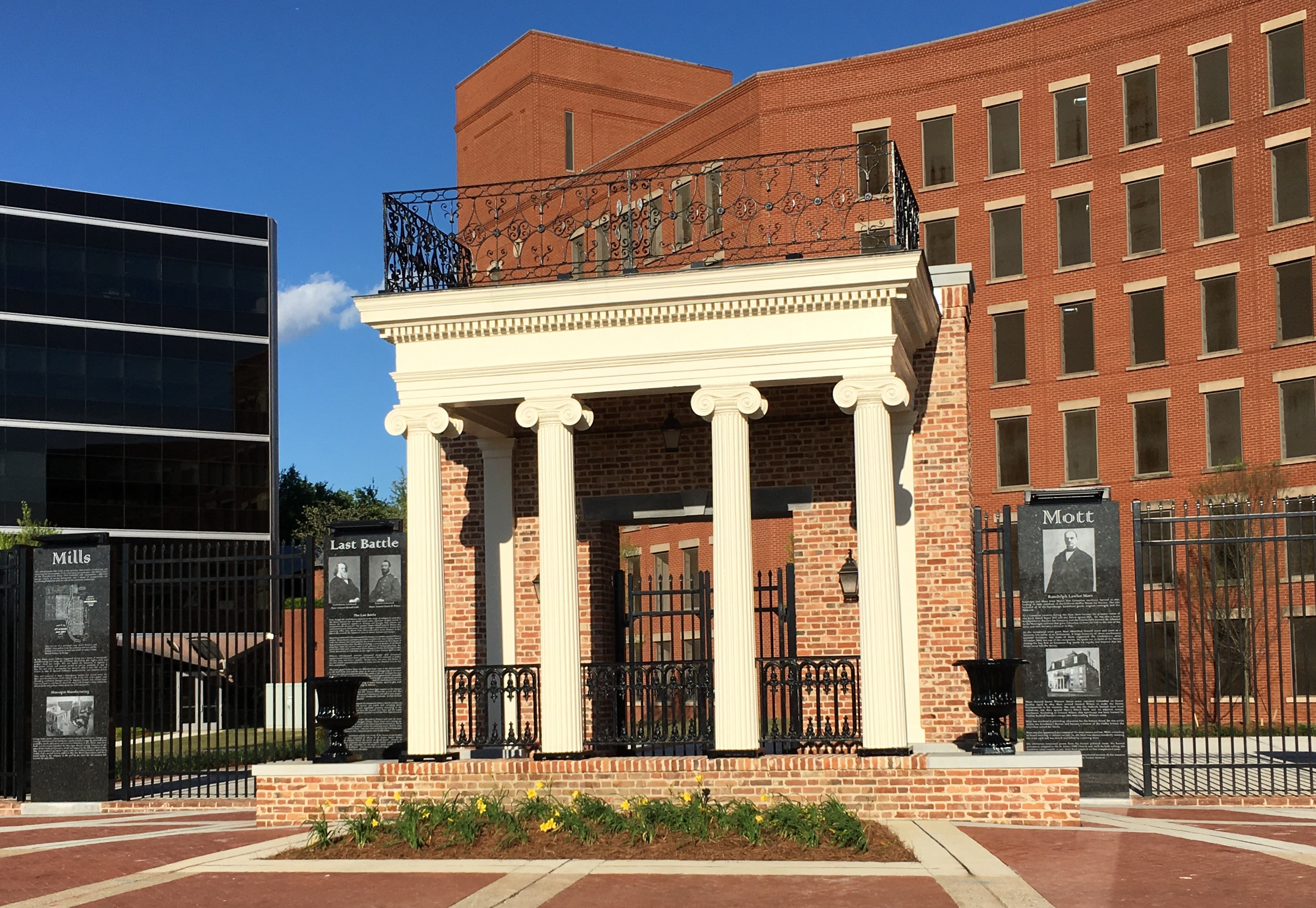
Mott House memorial facade, constructed in 2016

Downtown Columbus is home to many Antebellum homes, most listed in the NRHP, including the 1839 Goetchius House, the Garrett-Bullock House, and the Illges House. The Mott House was destroyed by fire in 2014; its memorial facade, pictured, was completed in 2016.

== Places of interest ==
Downtown Columbus is full of places that may interest tourists. These places include government buildings, sporting venues and other miscellaneous places, such as parks and convention centers.

=== Arts ===
- The Springer Opera House (the official State Theatre of Georgia) opened February 21, 1871. Today, the Springer Opera House hosts performances year-round on two stages. Emily Woodruff Hall, the 700-seat main theatre, hosts the popular Mainstage Series which features some of the nation's newest plays and musicals as well as timeless Broadway-style productions. Foley Hall, the Springer's more intimate space, hosts its Studio II Series as well as its Children's Theatre Series, featuring many of the area's talented student actors.
- RiverCenter for the Performing Arts opened in 2002 and has held host to many performances.

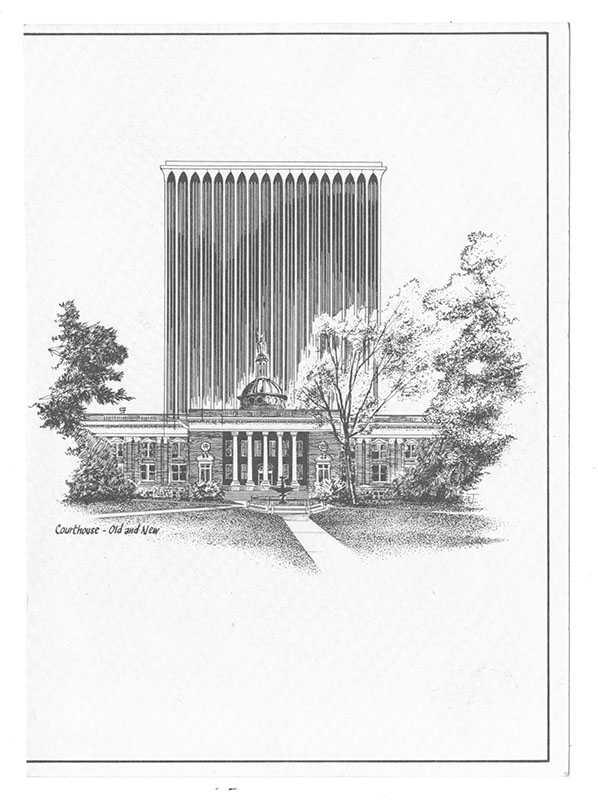
Columbus Public Buildings

=== Governmental facilities ===
- The Columbus Consolidated Government Center is the seat of the government for the City of Columbus. This building is where the Muscogee County Board of Commissioners meet as well as many of the county departments. The Government Center is located in the area that is bounded by 9th Street to the south, 2nd Avenue to the east, 10 Street to the north, and 1st Avenue to the west.
- The U.S. Post Office and Courthouse is historic building and functioning post office located two blocks from the Government Center.

=== Museums ===
- The National Civil War Naval Museum at Port Columbus is a facility that opened in 1962 and showcases information and artifacts from the Battle of Columbus, including two original American Civil War military vessels, uniforms, equipment and weapons used by the Union and Confederate navies.
- The Coca-Cola Challenger Space Science Center opened in 1996 for the purpose of public education in science, physics, and astronomy. It includes seven flight simulators and a planetarium.

=== Recreation ===
- The Chattahoochee RiverWalk is a 15-mile (24 km) walking/bike trail that connects users from downtown to South Columbus and the northern section of Fort Benning.
- Whitewater Express is a rafting service on the Chattahoochee River. The 2.5-mile (4.0 km) course is the longest urban whitewater rafting in the world, and has been ranked the world's best manmade whitewater course in the world by USA Today. It also features the Blue Heron Adventure, a zip-line connecting users from the Georgia side of the river to the Alabama side.

=== Sporting venues ===
- The largest indoor sporting arena in the city of Columbus is the Columbus Civic Center, which has a total capacity of 10,000 and is also home to the Columbus Lions, the city's PIFL football team, and also home to the Columbus Cottonmouths, the city's Southern Professional Hockey League team.
- Golden Park is a total 5,000 seat baseball stadium currently not home to a minor league baseball team.
- A. J. McClung Memorial Stadium, the site of football games between the Georgia Bulldogs and the Auburn Tigers from 1916 until 1958 (the Deep South's Oldest Rivalry). The stadium now hosts the Fort Valley State-Albany State and the Tuskegee-Morehouse rivalry games, as well local youth football and soccer and high school football games.

=== Places of worship ===
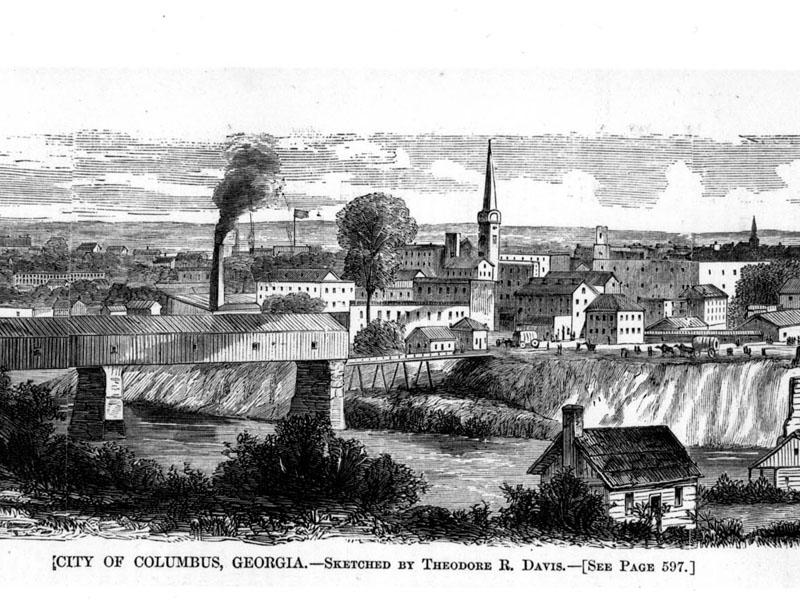
Downtown in 1880, showing the Church of the Holy Family (image by Theodore R. Davis)

Downtown consists of many places to worship, such as historic Church of the Holy Family, Columbus' first Roman Catholic parish. The area is also home to other historic congregations, including First Baptist Church, First Presbyterian Church, St. George's Anglican Church, St. Luke United Methodist Church, and Trinity Episcopal Church.

== Transportation ==
There are many modes of transportation in Downtown Columbus that can be used by both tourists and residents. METRA Transit System operates bus service in downtown, which connects riders to other places in the city. The primary way of getting around downtown for many people is by car. Downtown Columbus is accessible from Interstate 185 by J. R. Allen Parkway, which allows direct travel into the area via 2nd Avenue. Downtown is also served by two arterial roads, Veterans Parkway (north–south) and Victory Drive (east–west).

== "Downtown"/"Uptown" ==
There is confusion brought about by the use of the terms "Downtown" and "Uptown" for Columbus' central business district. Uptown Columbus is the title given to both a non-profit organization operating to encourage area growth and development (sometimes called "urban renewal") and also to the actual physical area of that development itself, which is an expanding subsection of the Downtown district located in the areas from Broadway to the Chattahoochee River.

== Tornado ==
On April 20, 2009, at approximately 12:40 AM Eastern Daylight Time, an EF2 tornado hit downtown with winds up to 135 miles per hour (217 km/h). This tornado caused damage to the Columbus State University Campus, the Springer Opera House, and the RiverCenter for the Performing Arts. This is the first time a tornado touched ground in downtown Columbus since weather records keeping began in the 1890s. While there were dozens of injuries, there were no fatalities.

== Gallery ==
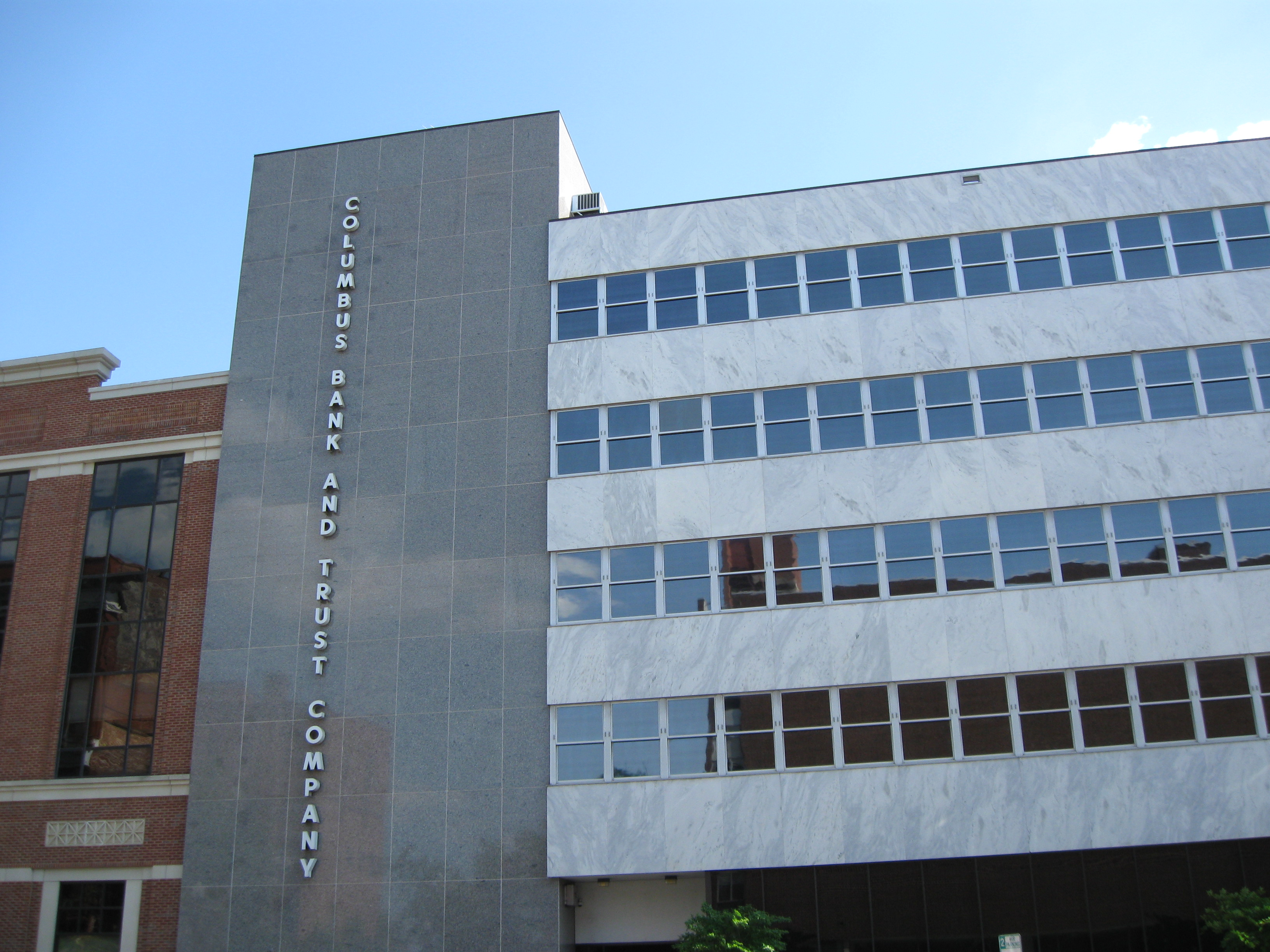
Former CB&T headquarters (now occupied by Columbus Consolidated Government).

Ledger Enquirer Tower

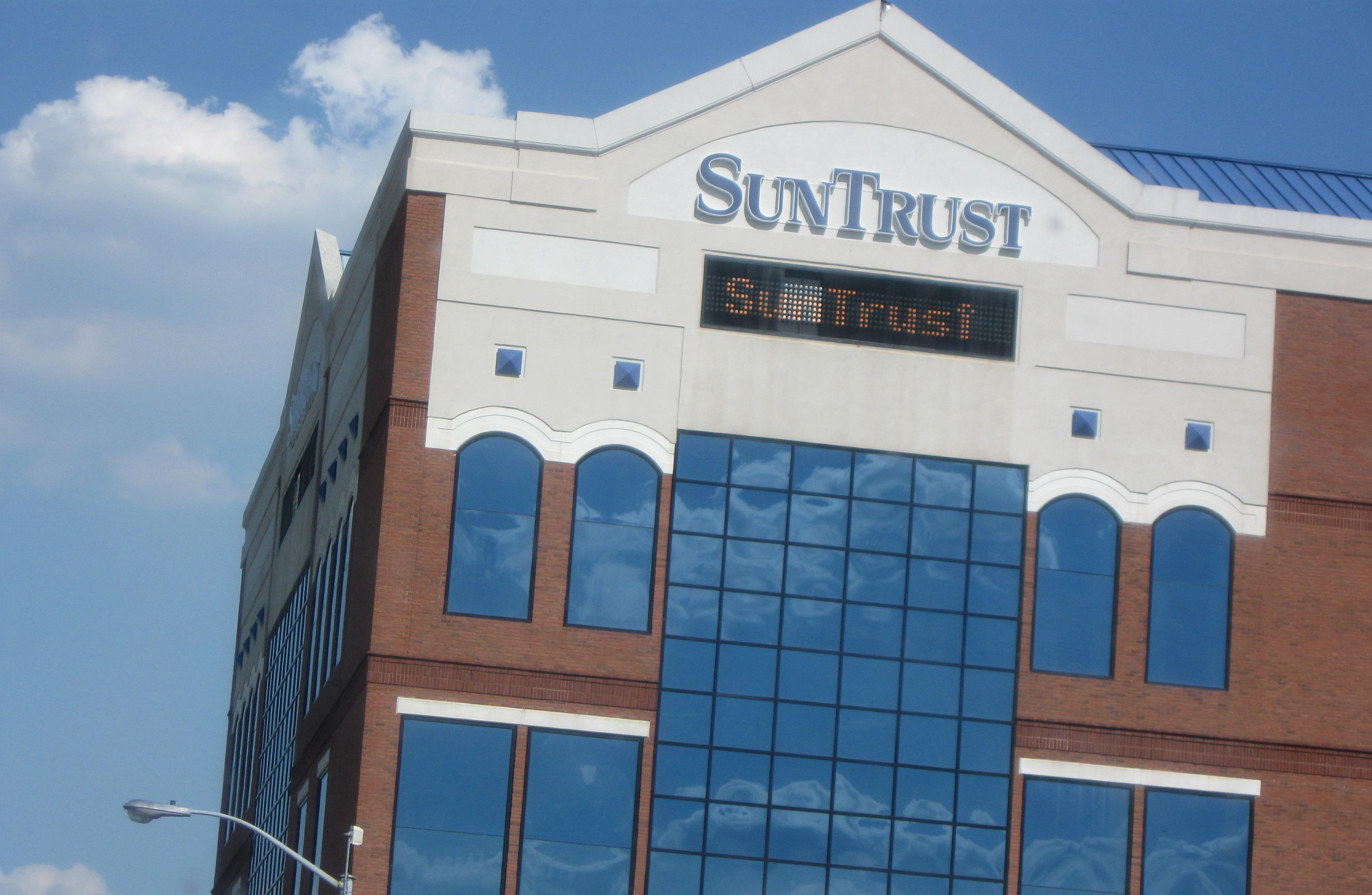
SunTrust Plaza (now Truist Plaza).

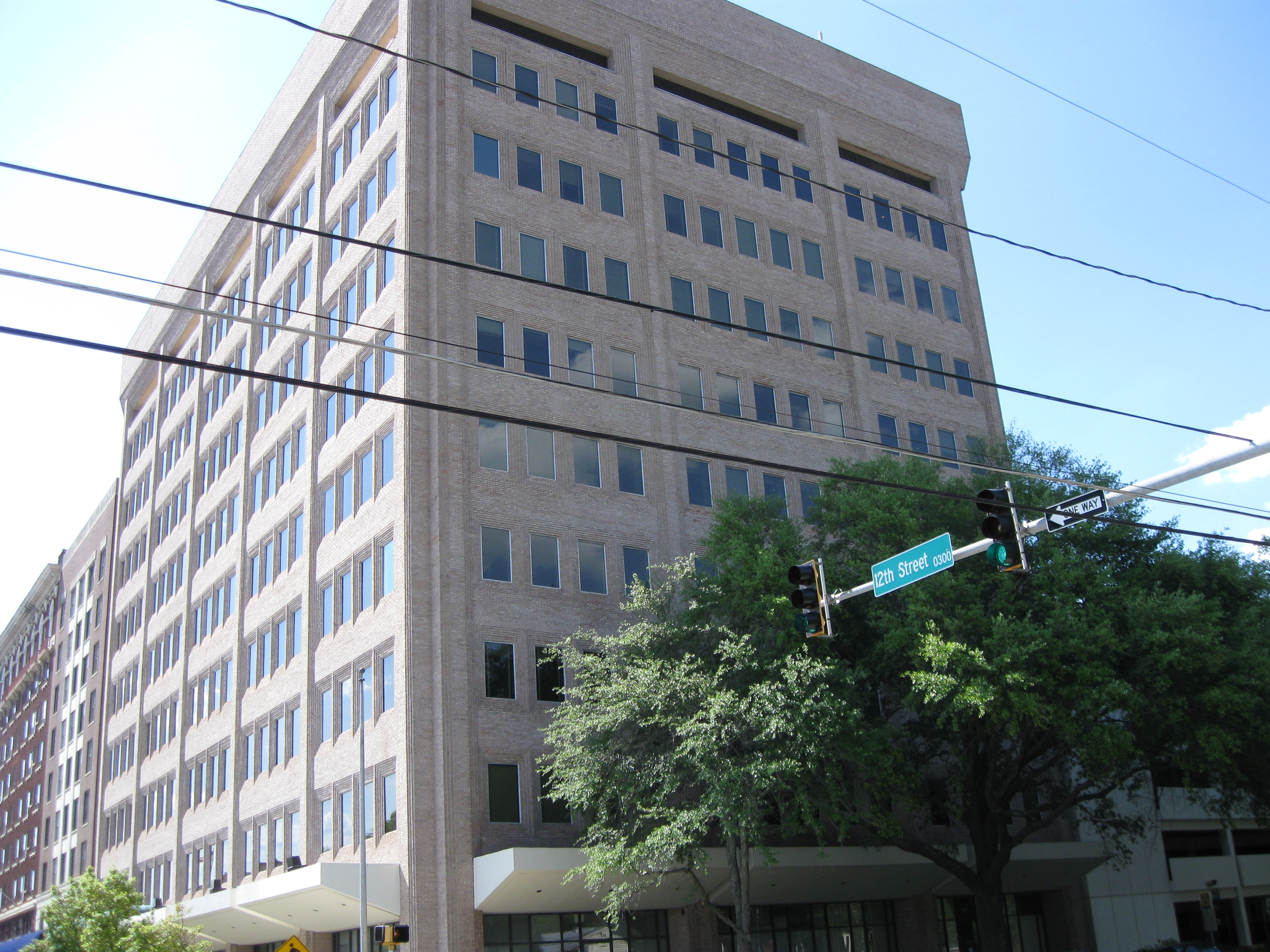
Corporate Center

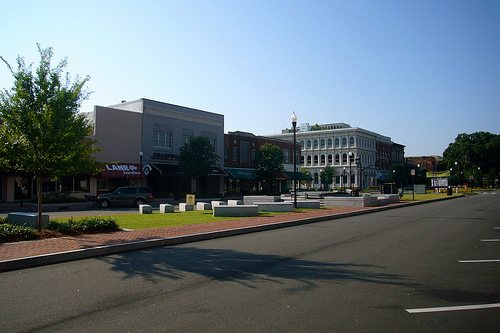
Shops on Broadway

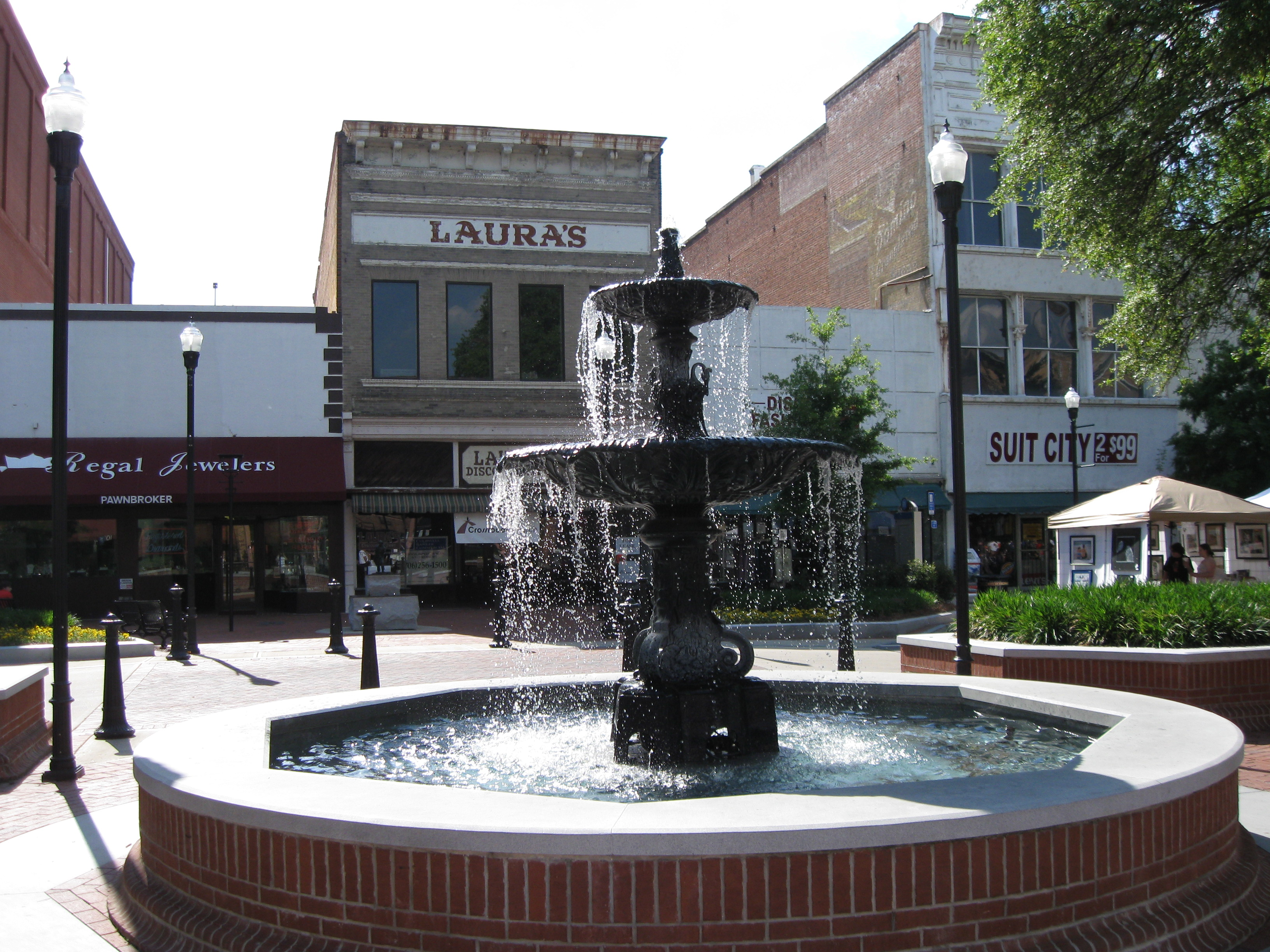
A fountain in Downtown

The Synovus Centre, as seen from Phenix City

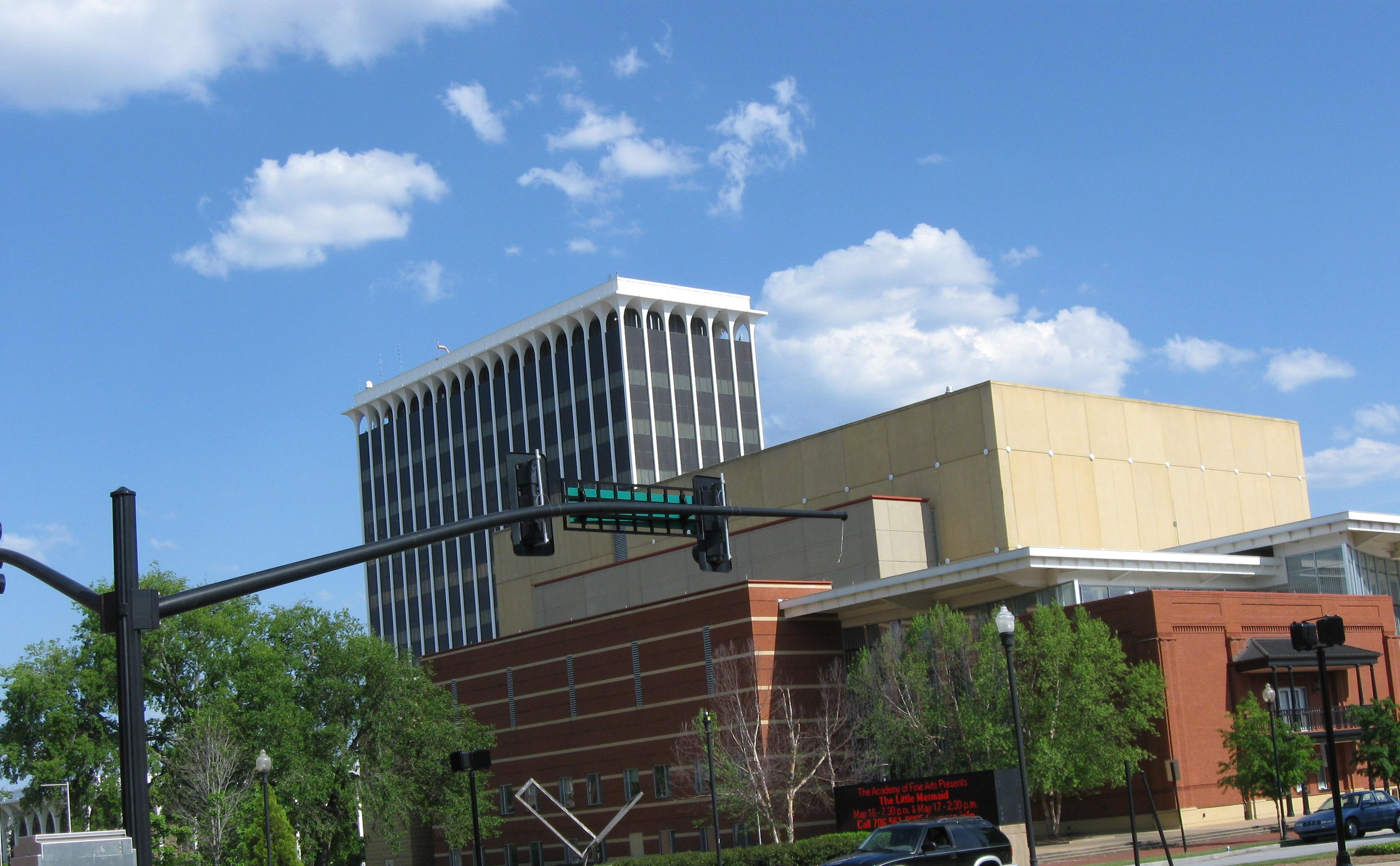
The Columbus Consolidated Government Center from Broadway

Downtown in the 1950s

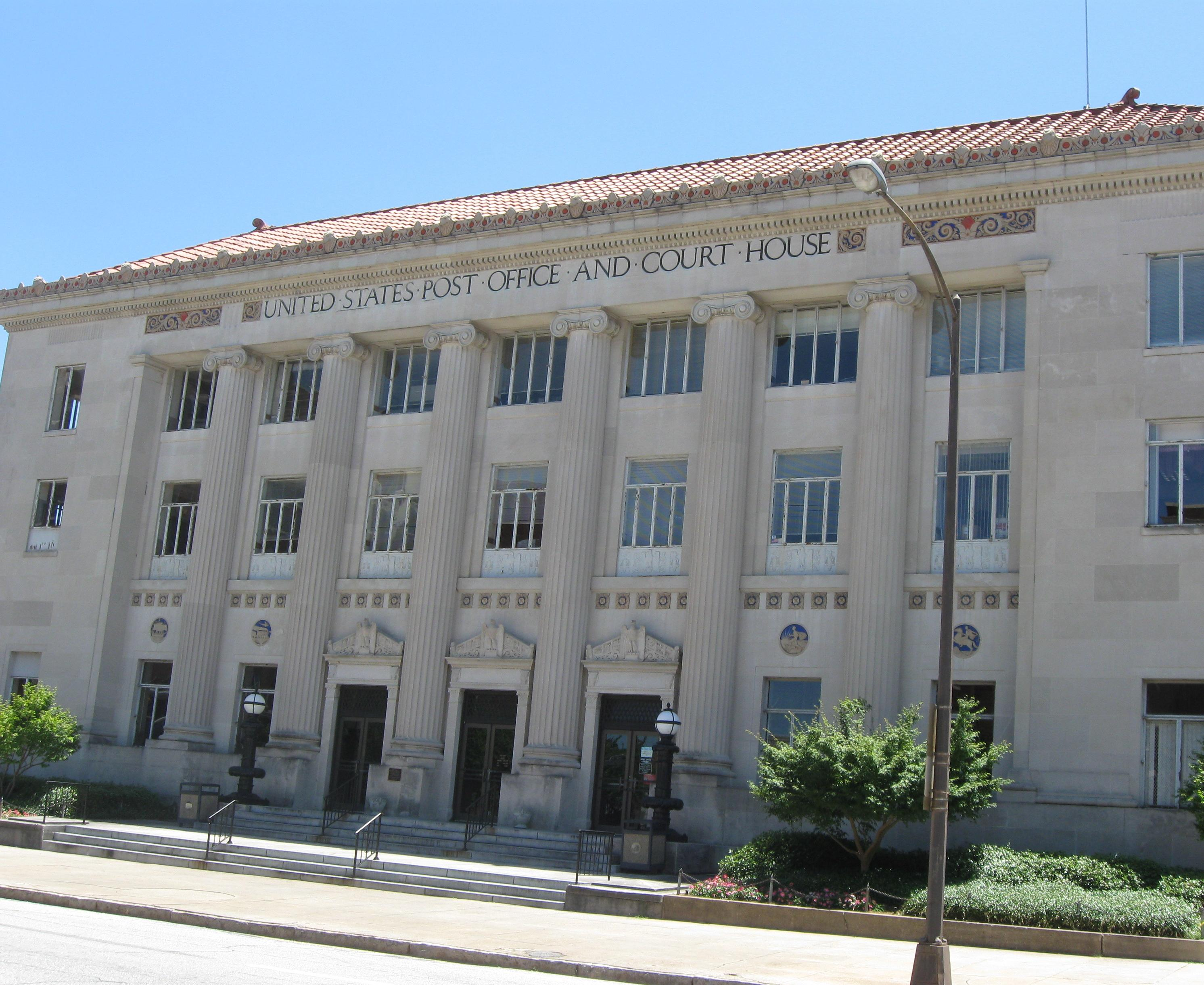
U.S. Post Office and Courthouse

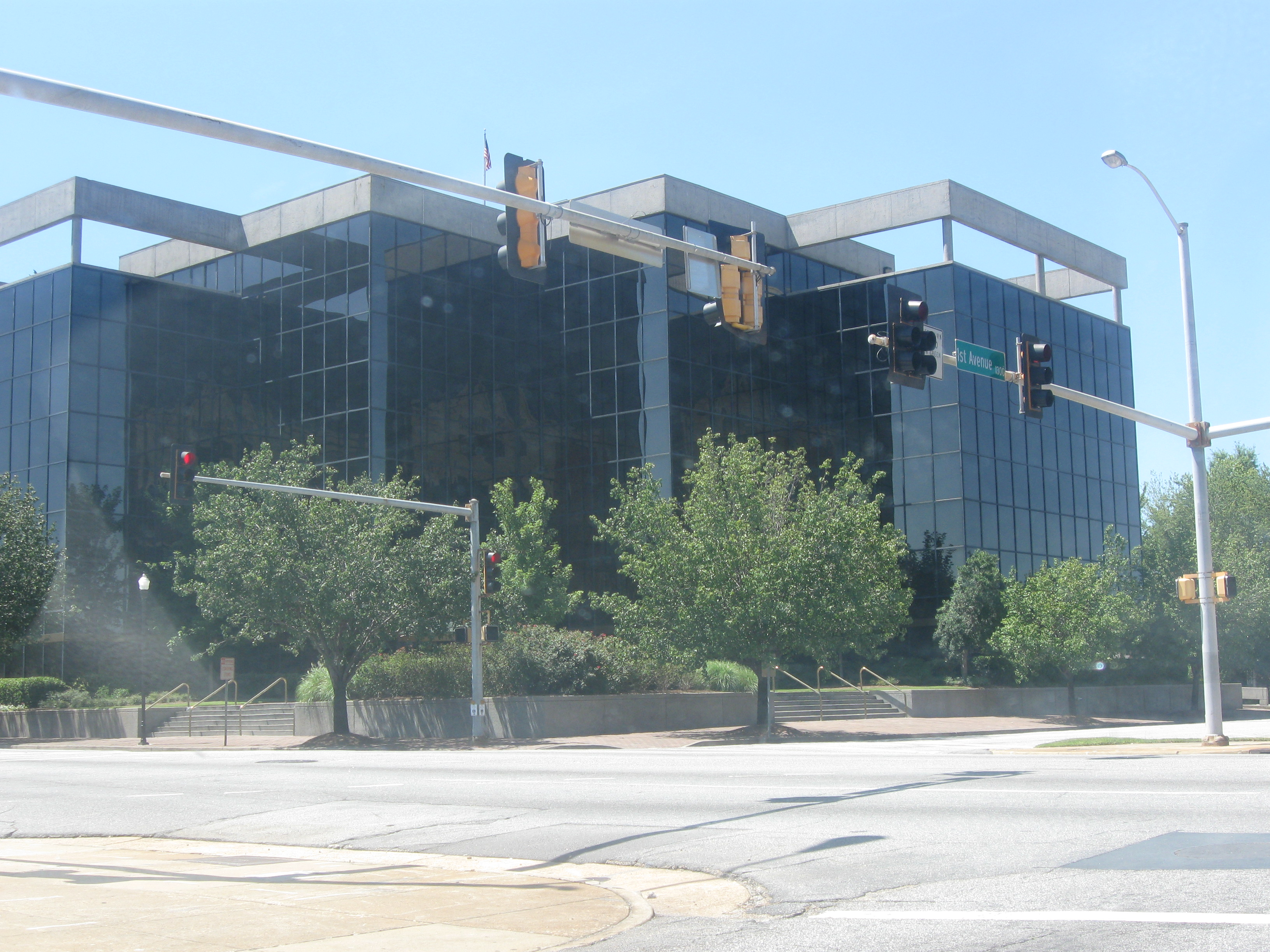
Carmike Cinemas headquarters

Ralston Towers
