= Swiffer =

Procter & Gamble household cleaning product

- Product type: Cleaning
- Current owner: Procter & Gamble
- Introduced: 1999; 27 years ago
- Markets: Worldwide
- Tagline: Stop cleaning. Start Swiffering.
- Website: www.swiffer.com

Swiffer is an American brand of cleaning products, manufactured by Procter & Gamble. Since its launch in 1999, Swiffer has achieved widespread popularity and become one of Procter & Gamble's most successful brands in the household cleaning products market, with its core product line centered around disposable towels and cleaning parts.

== Business model ==
Swiffer adopts a "razor-and-blades" business model, where the consumer purchases the handle assembly at a relatively low initial price, but is forced to continue purchasing spare refills and pads (blades) throughout the period of use of the product. This strategy ensures a steady flow of recurring revenue for Procter & Gamble. Since its launch, Swiffer has achieved widespread market reach, growing into a half-billion-dollar brand, operating in more than fifteen countries.

== Origin ==
In 1995, the Japanese Kao Corporation created the electrostatic cleaning market with the release of its Quickle Wiper product. Quickle "became the model for [Procter & Gamble's] Swiffer brand", though Procter & Gamble "did not seek a licensing agreement" and the Quickle Wiper was licensed to S. C. Johnson & Son.

== Products ==
=== Current products ===
All the products below have a refill system. Both the product and the refills are currently marketed.

- Swiffer Bissell Steamboost is a steam mop. It uses special steam pads and it deeply penetrates dirt.
- Swiffer Continuous Clean Air Cleaner is an air filtration system introduced in 2018. Like Swiffer mops, it uses a refill system for the filter, which is a common model across the air filtration industry. This product line is manufactured and marketed by a P&G licensee, Project Air LLC, of Cranberry, New Jersey.
- Swiffer Dusters are disposable dusters. They are advertised as 360° (All-Around) but the traditional Swiffer Dusters are also available (one side only). The optional extensible handle is 3 feet long, fully extended. The Swiffer Duster was introduced in 2003.
- Swiffer Sweeper is a combination sweeper-mop. That is, it can use either dry or wet-type disposable cloths. The wet cloths are for mopping and they have scrubbing strips which are for scrubbing tough dried-on greases. The dry type is for sweeping fine dirt, dust, hair, lint, and more. Originally, only the dry cloths were available, and was branded simply as "Swiffer" since it was the only product. Wet cloths for mopping were introduced in 2001.
- Swiffer Sweep and Trap was introduced in 2013 and has blades that grab big particles (like cereal) while a dry cloth picks up smaller particles, such as dust or lint.
- Swiffer Sweep + Vac is a lightweight vacuum cleaner. It uses a dry cloth for removing lint and fine dirt, while the vacuum picks up larger crumbs. As with all bagless vacuums, a removable filter needs to be cleaned after each use, and eventually replaced when too dirty to clean. The system cannot use wet cloths. It was introduced in 2004. At some point, the name was changed to Swiffer Sweeper-VAC and was discontinued in 2013. It was brought back in 2016.
- Swiffer Sweeper X-Large has a cloth head that is 1½ times larger than the regular Swiffer Sweeper. It uses two regular-sized wet cloths or one dry cloth designed for the system. This product was formerly called "Swiffer Max", "Swiffer Sweeper Heavy Duty" and "Swiffer Sweeper Professional". It was introduced in 2001. In 2013, it was once again renamed Swiffer Sweeper X-Large.
- Swiffer WetJet is a mop. It only uses WetJet brand solvent in a special, unopenable bottle. It was introduced in 2001 first in Canada then came to the United States. Its original name was the Swiffer WetJet. It was originally green in color until its redesign in 2006 when it changed to a purple color. It was modified again in 2009 with double sprayers added.

=== Past products ===
The following products have been discontinued.

- Swiffer Carpet Flick is a carpet-sweeping device that used a disposable, sticky card to collect dust, pet hair and fine dirt. Introduced January 1, 2005, it was discontinued December 31, 2008.
- Swiffer Mitts were mitts made of dry cloth that could be worn on one's hand. Introduced in 2002, they were discontinued in 2004. Its inventor is Willow Jackson. It is the only Swiffer product that is not a system (permanent unit and refills), as effectively the user's hand serves as the permanent part of the "system."
- Swiffer Dust-N-Shine is a furniture polish. The product uses a user-supplied dusting cloth as the pad. It was discontinued in late 2020. The reason for this was due to poor sales and a lack of interest from customers.

=== Reusable cloths ===
Because of the requirement to dispose of the cloth after each clean, using the device frequently can be quite costly. In response, multiple third-party companies have created cloth reusable pads typically made out of a microfiber fabric that can be machine washed after each use.

== Television commercials ==
The TV commercials for Swiffer often have 1970s–1980s music playing in the background. The old commercials start with a person having their old cleaning products and proceed to switch to Swiffer Products. The first series of commercials begin with a woman using the Swiffer product, while her old cleaning product (usually a mop, broom or feather duster), having a persona, is left out and wants to be used again. The woman continues to use her Swiffer and the mop is left by itself. The second series of commercials include the mop, broom or feather duster moving on to a new girlfriend (including a bowling ball, a rake or an antique doll). A commercial announcer (voiced by Blaze Berdahl) states, "Switch to Swiffer, and you'll dump your old (mop, broom, duster). But don't worry. He'll find someone else." Notable songs used in these commercials include "Whip It" by Devo, "Don't You Want Me" by Human League, "One Way or Another" by Blondie, "That Lady" by the Isley Brothers, "Baby Come Back" by Player, "Love Stinks" by The J. Geils Band & "What About Love" by Heart.
