= Herbal Essences =

Brand of hair care products

- Product type: Hair care
- Current owner: Procter & Gamble
- Country: United States
- Introduced: 1971; 55 years ago
- Markets: Worldwide
- Previous owners: Clairol
- Ambassador: Amaya Espinal
- Tagline: A totally organic experience
- Website: Official US Website; Official Australian Website

Herbal Essences is a brand of hair care products line by Procter & Gamble. The brand was founded in 1971 as the single shampoo Clairol Herbal Essence Shampoo (officially typeset as Clairol herbal essence shampoo). There are 29 collections of varying hair care products, each designed to have a different effect on the user's hair.

== History ==
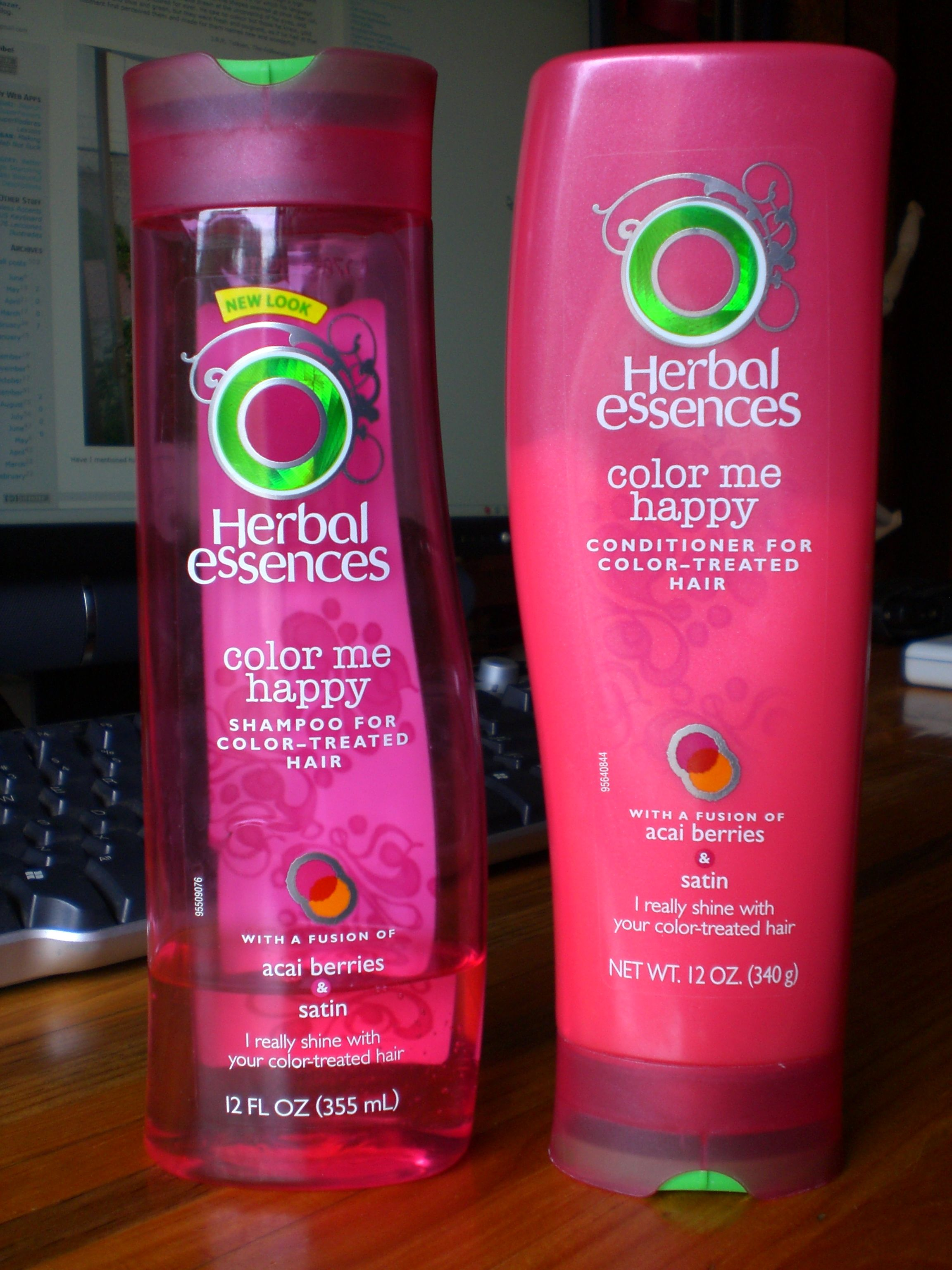
Herbal Essences shampoo and conditioner bottles, 2007

Clairol introduced Herbal Essence in 1971. The original Herbal Essence (now called Herbal Essences) used a cartoon image of the nature girl in a pool on the front label. The original color of the shampoo was green, and could be seen through the clear plastic bottle packaging. In 1997, Herbal Essences products were introduced to the UK and other markets.

In 2001, Clairol sold Herbal Essences to Procter & Gamble. The company was in a "long-term decline" according to Chairman and CEO A.G. Lafley. Currently, their shampoos and conditioners are characterized to be paraben, gluten, and sulfate-free.

The company has been developing sustainable strategies to cooperate with the environment. They partnered up with World Wildlife Fund Canada to work together to plant native plants that will attract pollinators, renew wildlife habitats in Canada, and build healthy, biodiverse landscapes that are more resilient to climate change. Additionally, in 2016, as a part of the Herbal Essences Sustainability Program, they began purchasing certified renewable electricity credits—which come from windmills—for their Iowa City plant.

In 2021, Procter & Gamble recalled about 30 of its hair products, including those of Herbal Essences, after detecting small amounts of the carcinogen benzene.

== Advertisement ==
In the 1990s and early 2000s, commercials of the brand featured women who simulated sexual ecstasy and orgasm by moaning sensually whilst shampooing their hair with the product, usually in a public setting such as a crowded super market, or in their bathroom shower, where they are heard by other people.

The brand also sponsored the CBS sitcom Two and a Half Men for the first five seasons.

In 1998, sex therapist and television host Ruth Westheimer (Dr. Ruth) appeared in a commercial for the shampoo and body wash.

In 2014, Nicole Scherzinger was featured in a commercial where she uses the shampoo and moans "yes, yes, yes!" in an airplane toilet, as other passengers hear her after she accidentally hits the PA system installed in the lavatory.
