= Saint Elmo =

Saint Elmo or St. Elmo may refer to:

== People ==
- Erasmus of Formia or Saint Elmo (died 303), patron saint of sailors
- Peter González or Saint Elmo (1190–1246), Castilian Dominican friar and priest
- St. Elmo Brady (1884–1966), first African American to obtain a Ph.D. in chemistry in the United States

== Places ==
=== Malta ===
- Fort Saint Elmo, a fortress in Valletta
- St. Elmo Bridge, a bridge located close to the above fort

=== United States ===
- St. Elmo, Alabama
- Saint Elmo, Colorado
- St. Elmo (Columbus, Georgia), a historic residence
- St. Elmo, Illinois
- St. Elmo, Louisiana, a community in Ascension Parish, Louisiana
- St. Elmo, Michigan, a community in Midland County
- St. Elmo Historic District (Chattanooga, Tennessee)
- St. Elmo Steak House, a restaurant in Indianapolis, Indiana, U.S.

== Organizations ==
- St. Elmo Society, a senior secret society at Yale University
- St. Elmo Hall, a building formerly owned by the St. Elmo Society at Yale University

== Fiction ==
- St. Elmo (novel), an 1866 novel by Augusta Jane Evans, which spawned numerous silent film adaptations:
  - St. Elmo (1910 Thanhouser film)
  - St. Elmo (1910 Vitagraph film)
  - St. Elmo (1914 film)
  - St. Elmo (1923 American film)
  - St. Elmo (1923 British film)
- Saint Elmo (comics), a member of the Marvel Comics team Alpha Flight
- Saint Elmo – Hikari no Raihousha, an anime television special

== See also ==
- Ida Saint-Elme, pen name of Maria Verfelt (1776–1845), Dutch writer and actress
- Fort Saint-Elme (France), Collioure
- Sant'Elmo, a hill and a fortress in Naples, Italy
- Elmo (disambiguation)
- San Telmo (disambiguation)
- Santelmo, a creature of Philippine mythology
- St. Elmo's Fire (disambiguation)
- "St. Elmo", a song by the band Geese from their 2023 album 3D Country
