= St. Elmo (1914 film) =

1914 film

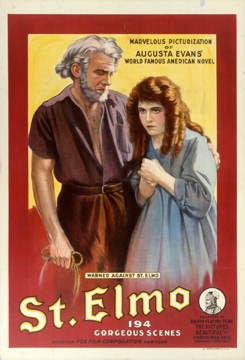
- Theatrical release poster
- Directed by: Bertram Bracken and/or; J. Gordon Edwards
- Written by: William Jossey
- Based on: St. Elmo by Augusta Jane Evans
- Produced by: William Fox
- Starring: William Jossey
- Production company: Balboa Amusement Producing Company
- Distributed by: Box Office Attractions Company
- Release date: August 1914
- Running time: 6 reels
- Country: United States
- Language: Silent (English intertitles)

St. Elmo is a 1914 American silent drama film produced by the Balboa Amusement Producing Company and distributed by William Fox's Box Office Attractions Company. It was the first feature-length film adaptation of Augusta Jane Evans's 1866 novel of the same name. The story follows the life of the title character (played by William Jossey), who kills his cousin (Francis McDonald) over the love of Agnes (Madeline Pardee), falls from grace, and eventually finds redemption and love with Edna (Gypsy Abbott). It is disputed who directed the film; many sources credit Bertram Bracken, while others list St. Elmo as J. Gordon Edwards's directorial debut.

Some reviewers praised the scenery and overall production quality, considering the film an improvement over staged adaptations of the novel. Others found the scenery irrelevant and the story confusing. Despite mixed reviews, the film was financially successful, reportedly setting box office records. The following year, a film adaptation of an unrelated Evans novel, Beulah, was marketed as a sequel. As with most Balboa films, St. Elmo is now believed lost.

== Plot ==
St. Elmo Murray and Murray Hammond, his cousin and best friend, are both in love with a young woman named Agnes Hunt. Although Agnes loves Murray, she rejects him for being too poor. Instead, she accepts the wealthy St. Elmo's marriage proposal. St. Elmo's mother holds a ball to celebrate the engagement. After the betrothal is publicly announced, Murray and Agnes meet covertly in the gardens. St. Elmo discovers their affair, challenges Murray to a duel, and kills his cousin with the first shot. The Devil possesses St. Elmo, and he becomes a cruel wanderer, spreading misery and misfortune where he travels.

Twenty years later, the ingenue Edna Earle is traveling by train, hoping to find employment in a cotton mill after the death of her father, the village blacksmith. The train derails, and St. Elmo saves her from the burning wreckage. This act sets St. Elmo on the path to salvation as he and Edna slowly fall in love. Initially planning to depart for distant lands, a vision of Christ leads him to aid the impoverished. Freed from the Devil, he becomes a minister and marries Edna.

== Cast ==
- William Jossey as St. Elmo Murray
- Mollie McConnell as Mrs. Murray
- Madeline Pardee as Agnes Hunt
- Francis McDonald as Murray Hammond
- Gypsy Abbott as Edna Earle
- Henry Stanley as Parson Hammond
- Richard Johnson (credited as Dick Johnson) as Mr. Grady
- Gus Leonard (credited as Pop Leonard) as Gabe
- Eulalie Jensen (credited as Miss Jensen) as Hagar
- Fred Whitman as Dent
- Frank Erlanger as Clinton

== Production ==
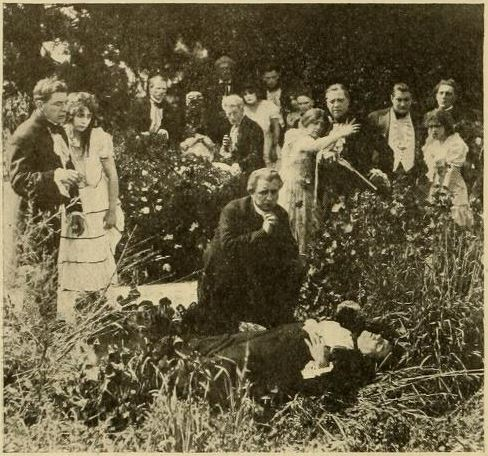
St. Elmo (Jossey) has killed his cousin (McDonald) as others look on. This scene was censored for Chicago showings.

Augusta Jane Evans's 1866 domestic novel St. Elmo was one of the best-selling novels of the 19th century, surpassed at the time only by Uncle Tom's Cabin, and later by Ben-Hur: A Tale of the Christ. With the novel's success came broad cultural impact. Various consumer products, hotels, steamboats, railway carriages, and even several towns were named after the book, and many families named children after its characters. Although there was considerable interest in a theatrical adaptation, Evans was concerned about how the novel's themes would be portrayed on the stage and did not approve the first script for a St. Elmo play until 1909. Other stage versions, many of which were financially successful, were quickly developed after her death later that year. The first film versions of the story followed shortly. In 1910, the Thanhouser Company chose St. Elmo for its second production, and Vitagraph Studios produced its own adaptation the same year. Both were one-reel short films.

In 1914, while working for the Balboa Amusement Producing Company, William Jossey wrote the screenplay for the first feature-length film adaptation. Filming took place in Long Beach, California, where the Balboa studios were located. Footage of an actual church under construction across the street from the studio was used for a scene in which one was built by St. Elmo. Contemporary writers credited Bertram Bracken as director, as do some modern sources, including the American Film Institute. Others consider the film the directorial debut of J. Gordon Edwards. Both men subsequently had long careers directing for Fox Film.

Balboa highlighted the film's production value and artistry in its marketing; its film poster advertises "194 gorgeous scenes". However, Balboa was not a film distributor, so in May 1914 they contracted with William Fox's Box Office Attractions Company to have Fox handle the distribution of all Balboa films, beginning with St. Elmo. Copies of these films were then shown at Fox's theaters or rented out to other theater franchise owners, in what was known as the states' rights distribution system. On 1 February 1915, William Fox incorporated Fox Film, which inherited Box Office's assets. The new company continued to distribute some Box Office films, including St. Elmo, which played in some areas into 1916.

== Reception and legacy ==
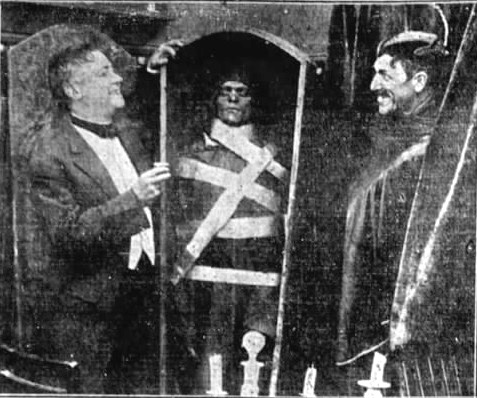
St. Elmo shares a drink with the Devil, with Murray's body in a coffin between them. This scene was also censored in Chicago.

Contemporary reviews were mixed. Writing for Motion Picture News, A. Danson Michell found the film superior to stage adaptations of the novel, and especially praised the photography. Moving Picture World's Hanford Judson also gave a generally positive review, believing that its production qualities and popular appeal more than compensated for the "artificiality" of a few scenes. Not all critics praised the film. Vanderheyden Fyles of Movie Pictorial felt the Long Beach scenery lauded elsewhere was irrelevant to the plot and the adapted story was a "baffling mix-up". A particularly negative review appeared in Variety, suggesting the film was so bad that its makers "might have got a little profit out of the raw [film] by not ruining it through putting St. Elmo on it." The Chicago Board of Censorship found some scenes objectionable and required that Chicago showings of the film be edited to remove depictions of dueling and Murray's dead body.

St. Elmo was a financial success, reported by The Photoplayers' Weekly as breaking box office records. The following year, Bertram Bracken directed a film adaptation of another Augusta Jane Evans novel, Beulah (1859), for Balboa. Though not directly related to St. Elmo, the 1915 Beulah film was marketed as a sequel. In 1923, Fox Film produced another adaptation of the novel, also titled St. Elmo, which was also a success.

Around 90% of Balboa's films have been lost, probably including the 1914 St. Elmo. The Library of Congress is not aware of any extant copies.

== See also ==
- List of lost silent films (1910–14)

== Bibliography ==
- Fidler, William Perry (2002). Augusta Evans Wilson, 1835–1909. University of Alabama Press. ISBN 978-0-8173-5026-0.
- Goble, Alan (1999). The Complete Index to Literary Sources in Film. Bowker-Saur. ISBN 978-1-85739-229-6.
- Jura, Jean-Jacques; Bardin, Rodney Norman (2007). Balboa Films: A History and Filmography of the Silent Film Studio. McFarland. ISBN 978-0-7864-3098-7.
- Justice, Fred C.; Smith, Tom R., eds. (1914). Who's Who in the Film World. Film World Publishing. OCLC 8807170.
- Keister, Douglas (2011). Stories in Stone New York: A Field Guide to New York City Cemeteries and Their Residents. Gibbs Smith. ISBN 978-1-4236-2102-7.
- Neale, Steve; Hall, Sheldon (2010). Epics, Spectacles, and Blockbusters: A Hollywood History. Wayne State University Press. ISBN 978-0-8143-3008-1.
- Slide, Anthony (1978). Aspects of American Film History Prior to 1920. Scarecrow Press. ISBN 978-0-8108-1130-0.
- Slide, Anthony (2001). The New Historical Dictionary of the American Film Industry (2nd ed.). Scarecrow Press. ISBN 978-1-57886-015-9.
- Slide, Anthony; Gevinson, Alan (1987). The Big V: A History of the Vitagraph Company (revised ed.). Scarecrow Press. ISBN 978-0-8108-2030-2.
- Solomon, Aubrey (2011). The Fox Film Corporation, 1915–1935: A History and Filmography. McFarland. ISBN 978-0-7864-6286-5.
- Tarbox, Charles H. (1983). Lost Films 1895–1917. Jef Films. ISBN 978-0-9610916-0-6.
