= Elmo (given name) =

Male given name

Elmo is a male name, derivative of Erasmus, via the old Italian diminutive Ermo.

It can also be a diminutive form of the given name Guglielmo.

== People with this name ==
=== Others ===
- Elmo Fernando (died 2016), Sri Lankan Sinhala journalist and radio announcer
- Elmo Henriksson (born 2003), Finnish footballer
- Elmo Hope (1923-1967), American jazz pianist
- Elmo Kassin (born 1969), Estonian cross-country skier
- Elmo Langley (1928-1996), American safety car driver in NASCAR
- Elmo Lincoln (1889–1952), American actor
- Elmo McClain (1917-1972), American politician
- Elmo Nüganen (born 1962), Estonian theatre director, film director, and actor
- Elmo Kennedy O'Connor (born 1994), American rapper, known professionally as Bones
- Elmo Noel Joseph Perera (1932–2015), 5th Bishop of the Roman Catholic Diocese of Galle
- Elmo Rodrigopulle (1941–2021), Sri Lankan cricketer
- Elmo Roper (1900–1971), American pollster
- Elmo Shropshire (born 1936), singer of the novelty holiday song "Grandma Got Run Over by a Reindeer"
- Elmo Stoll (1944–1998), American writer and religious leader, was a prominent former Old Order Amish bishop who founded the "Christian Communities"
- Elmo Tiisvald (born 1967), Estonian conductor
- Elmo Russell Zumwalt Jr. (1920–2000), American naval officer

== Fictional characters ==
- Elmo, a Muppet character on the television show Sesame Street, and the basis for the children's toy Tickle Me Elmo
- Elmo Aardvark, a cartoon character created by Will Ryan

== See also ==
- Elmer
- Elmo (disambiguation)
- Saint Elmo (disambiguation)
- San Telmo (disambiguation)
