= Dinglewood =

Dinglewood may refer to:

- Dinglewood, Columbus, Georgia, a neighborhood in Columbus, Georgia
- Dinglewood House (Columbus, Georgia), a house at 1429 Dinglewood Avenue, listed on the NRHP in Georgia
- Dinglewood Historic District, Columbus, Georgia, listed on the NRHP in Georgia
