= Georgia Cottage =

Historic house in Alabama, United States

- U.S. National Register of Historic Places
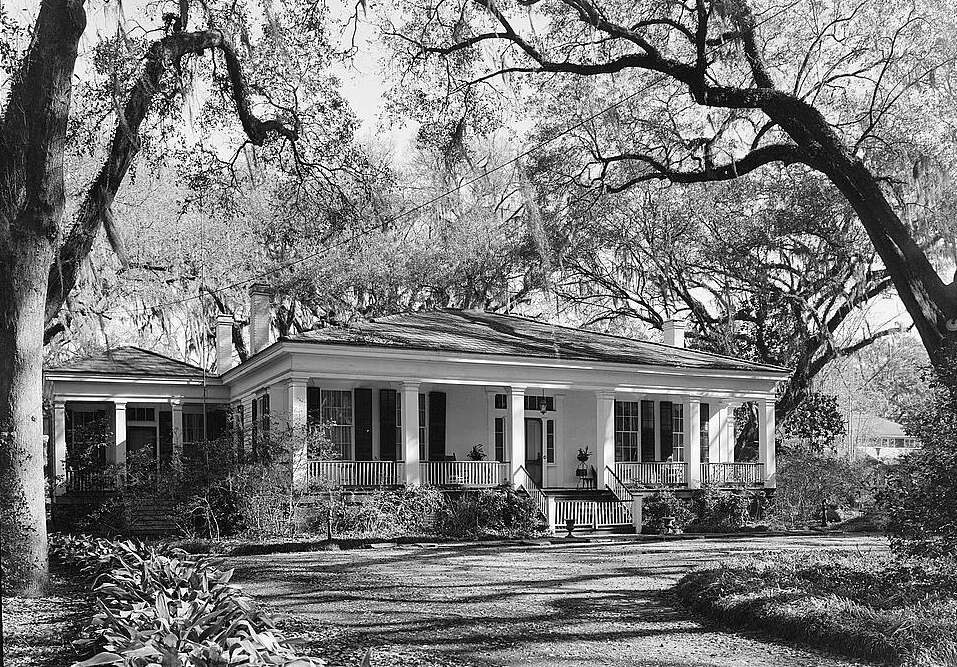
- HABS photo of Georgia Cottage in 1963

- Location within Mobile, Alabama Location within Alabama Location within the United States
- Location: 2564 Springhill Avenue; Mobile, Alabama
- Coordinates: 30°41′47″N 88°6′0″W
- Area: 6 acres (2.4 ha)
- Built: 1840
- Architectural style: Greek Revival
- NRHP reference No.: 72000170
- Added to NRHP: September 14, 1972

Georgia Cottage, also known as the Augusta Evans Wilson House, is a historic residence in Mobile, Alabama, United States. It was added to the National Register of Historic Places on September 14, 1972, based on its association with Augusta Jane Evans. She was one of the most popular American novelists of the nineteenth century and the first female author in the United States to earn over $100,000 for her work, but has been largely forgotten in recent times.

== History ==
Colonel John Murrell of Georgia had the Greek Revival style house built in 1840 for his daughter, Mrs. William A. Hardaway. It was then sold in 1855 to Alfred Batre, nephew of Adolphe Batre, Mobile Mayor (1830), who purchased it for his new bride Hortense Addison, daughter of Lloyd Dulany Addison of the Oxon Hill Manor Addison's. Augusta Jane Evans purchased the house from Batre in 1857 for her father, Matthew R. Evans, with the proceeds from her first book, Inez: A Tale of the Alamo. Matthew Evans had relocated his family to Mobile from San Antonio, Texas, in 1849. The Batres would move into 110 S Franklin Street, then 400 Church Street.

Augusta Evans went on to write two of her most famous novels at Georgia Cottage, Macaria and St. Elmo. She married Lorenzo Madison Wilson in the parlor of the house in 1868. Following her marriage she moved into her husband's Greek Revival mansion, Ashland, namesake of the modern Ashland Place neighborhood. Georgia Cottage remained in the Evans family until 1879, when it was sold to Andrew Damrell. Damrell's heirs sold it in 1926 to J.N. Brownlee, and it was subsequently purchased by Dr. Edward Simmons Sledge in 1935.

Dr. Sledge's son, Eugene Bondurant Sledge, grew up at Georgia Cottage. He served in the United States Marines during World War II and became a noted university professor and author. His memoir With the Old Breed: At Peleliu and Okinawa was, in part, the basis for Ken Burn's PBS documentary, The War, and the HBO miniseries, The Pacific.

== Architecture and grounds ==
Although now deep within the Mobile city limits, Georgia Cottage was a country house when originally built. Slave labor was utilized in its construction.

The one-story wood-frame structure, on a brick foundation, is a stylistic blending of Gulf Coast cottage and Greek Revival forms. It has matching side wings to each side of the main block and a hipped roof.

The house is situated at the end of a long avenue of live oaks, planted prior to 1840. The avenue is listed with Alabama's Famous and Historic Trees Program.
