= Elmo (disambiguation) =

Elmo is a Muppet character on the children's television show Sesame Street.

Elmo may also refer to:

== Given name ==
- Elmo (given name), including a list of people and fictional characters

== Entertainment ==
- "Elmo", a song by Canadian singer Holly McNarland

== Places ==
Italy

- Elmo, Sorano, a village in province of Grosseto, Tuscany

United States

- Elmo, Kansas, an unincorporated community
- Elmo Township, Otter Tail County, Minnesota
- Elmo, Missouri, a city
- Elmo, Montana, a census-designated place
- Elmo, Texas, an unincorporated community
- Elmo, Utah, a town
- Elmo, Wisconsin, an unincorporated community

== Science and technology ==
- ELMO (protein) (Engulfment and cell motility), a family of adaptor proteins involved in cell signalling
- ELMO (Eocene Layer of Mysterious Origin) a red clay layer on Walvis Ridge in the Atlantic Ocean
- ELMO, a mathematical competition in the Mathematical Olympiad Program
- ELMO, election monitoring software available through The Carter Center
- Elmo (shogi engine), computer shogi engine
- ELMo, a word embedding method created by researchers at the Allen Institute for Artificial Intelligence and University of Washington

== Other ==
- El Morocco, nickname Elmo, 20th-century nightclub in the U.S. city of New York
- Elmo (company), a Japanese company best known for their Super 8mm projectors during the 1950s–80s
- Elon Musk, nicknamed Elmo, billionaire entrepreneur

== See also ==
- Lake Elmo (disambiguation)
- Saint Elmo (disambiguation)
- Telmo (disambiguation)
- San Telmo (disambiguation)
- Delmo (disambiguation)
