= Highland Hall =

Highland Hall may refer to:

- Highland Hall (Columbus, Georgia), listed on the National Register of Historic Places in Muscogee County, Georgia
- Highland Hall (Lexington, Kentucky), listed on the National Register of Historic Places in Fayette County, Kentucky
- Highland Hall (Hollidaysburg, Pennsylvania), listed on the National Register of Historic Places in Blair County, Pennsylvania
