= St. Elmo Historic District (Chattanooga, Tennessee) =

Historic district in Tennessee, United States

- U.S. National Register of Historic Places
- U.S. Historic district
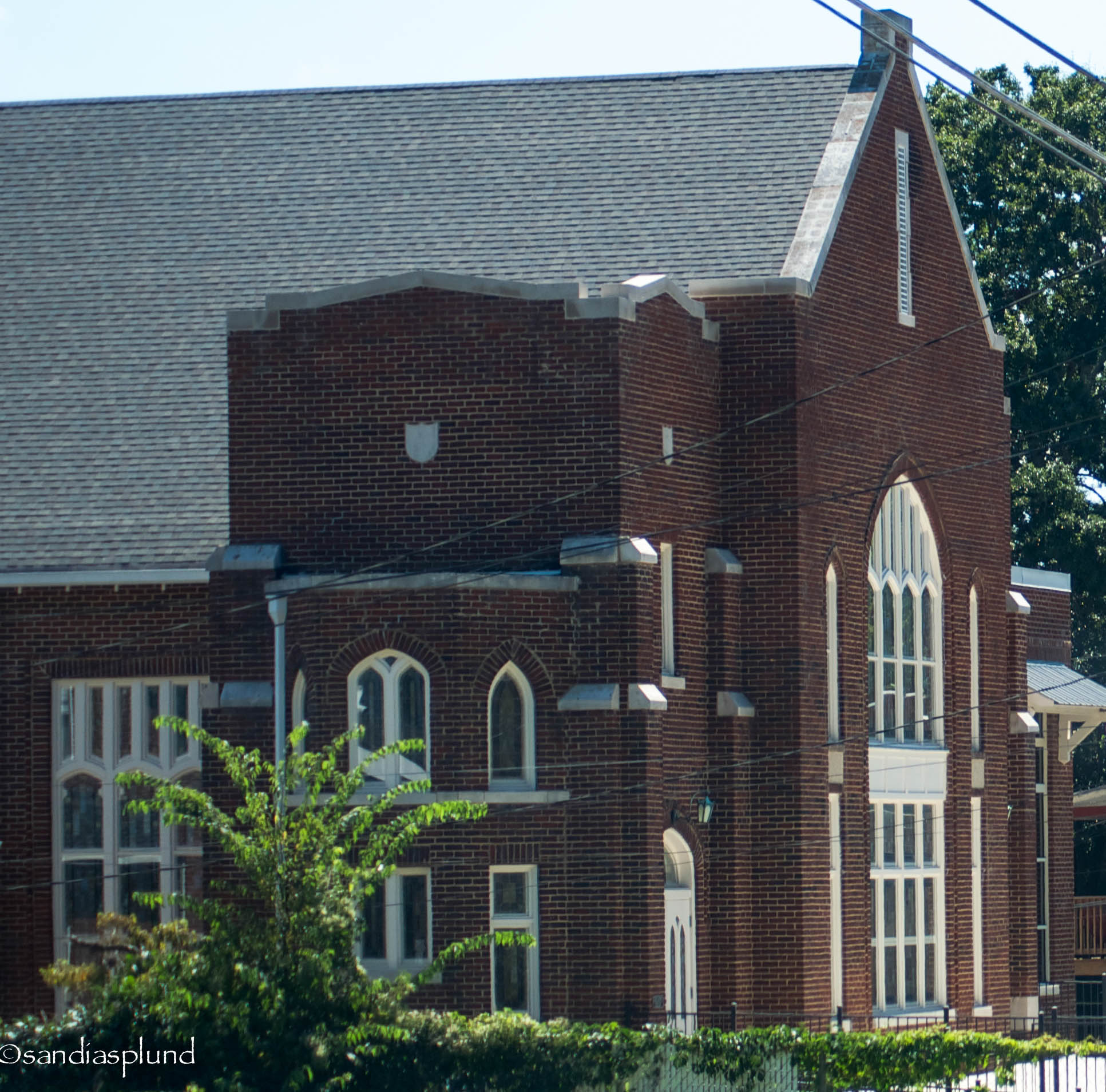
- St. Elmo United Methodist Church

- Location within Tennessee Location within the United States
- Location: Chattanooga, Tennessee
- Coordinates: 34°59′43″N 85°16′49″W
- Built: 1885
- Architect: Various
- Architectural style: Victorian and Victorian bungalow
- NRHP reference No.: 82003976
- Added to NRHP: April 4, 1992

The St. Elmo Historic District, or St. Elmo for short, is a neighborhood in the city of Chattanooga, Tennessee. It is situated in the southernmost part of Hamilton County within the valley of Lookout Mountain below the part of the Tennessee River known as Moccasin Bend. St Elmo is at the crossroads of two ancient Indian trails, and was first occupied by Native American hunters and gatherers in the Woodland period, then agricultural Mississippians, including Euchee and Muscogee, and for a brief period between 1776 and 1786, the Cherokees in a community called Lookout Town. St. Elmo became part of the city of Chattanooga when it was annexed in September 1929.

Hundreds of properties in the neighborhood were listed on the National Register in 1982, and in 1996 St. Elmo was designated a Local Historic District. Many of the buildings from the late 19th and early 20th century have been preserved. A St. Elmo resident is an 'Elmoian'.

== Settlement ==
In 1776, Cherokee chief Dragging Canoe and several hundred Cherokee warriors migrated to Chickamauga Creek after objecting to a treaty between other Cherokees and American land speculators and promising active resistance. They became known as the Chickamaugas, and eventually moved farther down the Tennessee River below The Suck; to the other end of the Tennessee River Gorge. There they built the "Five Lower Towns" at Running Water (now Whiteside) and further downriver. Between 1777 and 1782, the so-called "Chickamaugas" also had a town called Tsatanugi (or Chatanuga, based on the Muscogee word cvto - rock), near here along Chattanooga Creek.

Daniel Ross, a young Scottish immigrant, came to the area in 1785 and worked at a trading post with John McDonald, the area's first businessman. Ross married McDonald's daughter and the two built a house in what was to become St. Elmo after the Wars. Their youngest son, John Ross, was the leader of the Cherokee Nation who would call for passive resistance to the federal Indian removal policies that led to the Trail of Tears in 1838.

== Early St. Elmo and Chattanooga ==
Up until 1838, the Tennessee River was the dividing line between Hamilton County and the Cherokee country. That year, the community of Ross's Landing was surveyed, and in 1839 the village of Chattanooga was established north of the mouth of Chattanooga Creek. In 1840, the state of Tennessee began to sell the property formerly owned by the Cherokees at the rate of $7.50 an acre.

James Whiteside purchased 5,000 acres of land, including most of the northern end of Lookout Mountain. To encourage tourism, Whiteside built a turnpike up the mountain and a three-story hotel for tourists, which opened in 1855. Among the visitors was young writer Augusta Jane Evans, who became friends with Whiteside's daughter, Thankful Whiteside, and her husband, Abraham Malone Johnson. Evans was said to have quipped that the view toward Chattanooga from Lookout Mountain reminded her of the view of Naples, Italy from St. Elmo Castle. After the American Civil War and in need to cash, Evans published a novel set in the vicinity about a young woman whose Christian virtue redeems a cynical lothario named Clinton St. Elmo. Titled St. Elmo, the novel appeared in 1866 to great success, selling more than a million copies within four months of its publication date. The area took its name from the novel. Harriet Beecher Stowe's Uncle Tom's Cabin was the only American novel to sell more copies in the nineteenth century.

== Yellow fever and urban development ==
A yellow fever epidemic in Chattanooga caused an exodus in 1878. Almost 12,000 people fled the city, many going to Lookout Mountain. At the time, the mountain was accessible on the north side only by a four-hour trip up the old Whiteside Turnpike, which was built in the 1850s and cost a toll of two dollars. Complaints about the toll led to the 1879 construction of the St. Elmo Turnpike, which had an easier grade and a lower toll (the St. Elmo turnpike was paved and renamed the Adolph S. Ochs Highway in the late 1920s).

Until the 1880s, the area at the foot of Lookout Mountain remained primarily a wooded area. The real boom in the growth of St. Elmo as a residential community coincided with the planning and development of the Chickamauga and Chattanooga National Military Park, which was dedicated in 1890. At the time, St. Elmo saw development resulting from both a general real estate and construction boom in the South and the 1893 expansion of an electric trolley from Chattanooga to St. Elmo.

== Connecting St. Elmo to Chattanooga ==
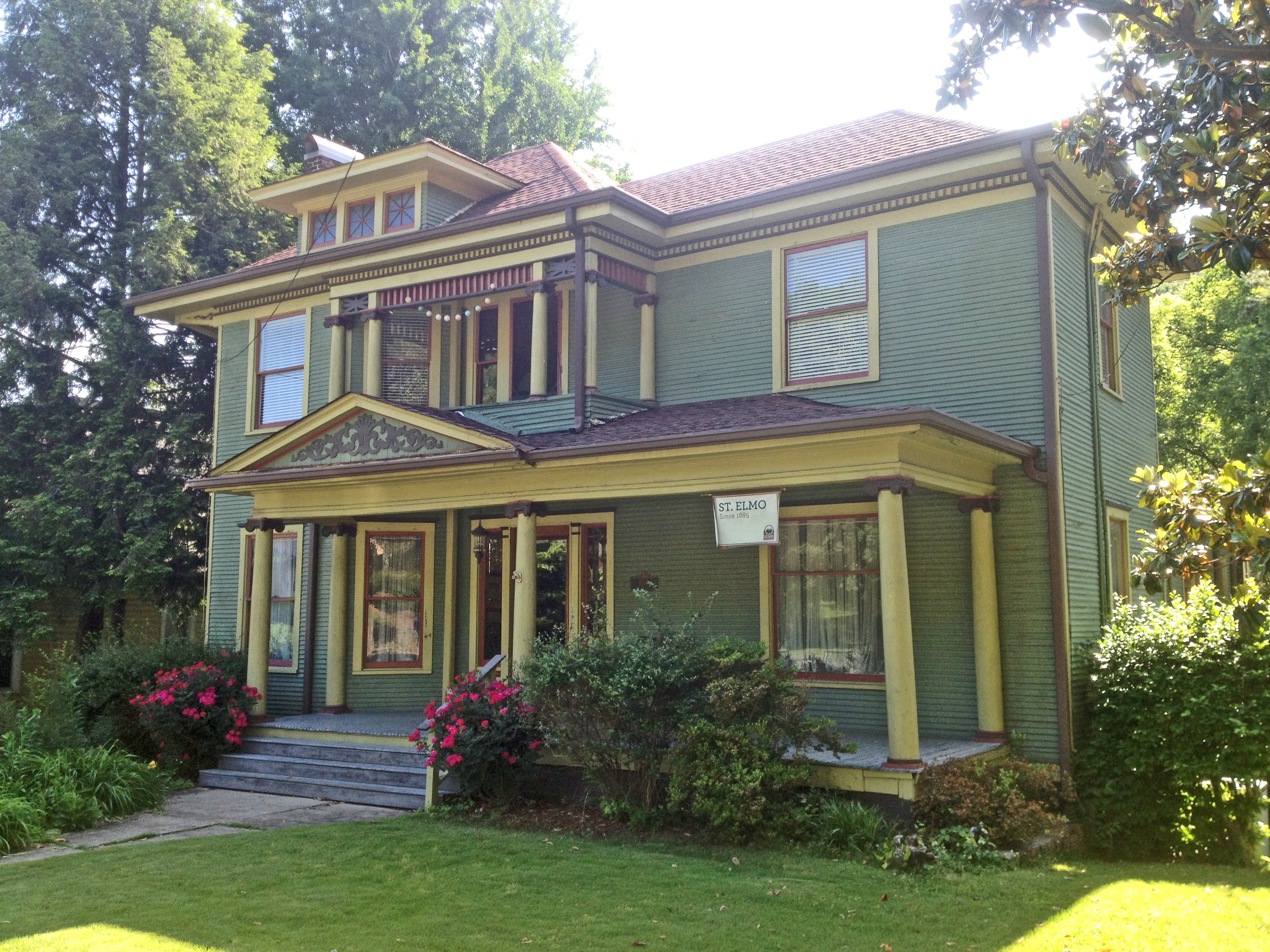
House on St. Elmo Avenue, built ca. 1900.

The trolley was not the only transportation development to influence the history of St. Elmo. In 1887, the narrow-gauge Incline #1 ran cars from St. Elmo up to the bluffs of Lookout Mountain. Soon after, a broad-gauge line was opened for carrying regular railroad cars to the mountaintop. And finally, in 1895, Incline #2 (now known as the Incline Railway) started taking passengers up the steepest part of the mountain. Its views were popular with both residents and tourists, and by 1900 the success of this railway closed down all of its competitors. Today, "America's Most Amazing Mile" still enjoys the distinction of being the world's steepest passenger railway.

In 1905, St. Elmo was incorporated and a town commission was formed for the purpose of securing funding for a school. A bond was issued, and work on the building was completed at the end of 1906. The small brick building replaced St. Elmo's first school, established in 1891.

It wasn't until 1926 that a direct route was established between St. Elmo and Chattanooga. The city wanted to provide a thoroughfare to St. Elmo and Lookout Mountain, but Broad Street ended abruptly at Ninth Street (now Martin Luther King Boulevard), terminating at a railroad station owned by the State of Georgia. Negotiations to open a passageway for a road through the south side had failed over the years. Chattanooga Commissioner Ed Bass took matters into his own hands on the night of May 6, when he and a crew of city workers bulldozed enough of the buildings to establish a right-of-way for cars. The city got its road, and eventually Georgia sold the rest of its holdings in the area.
