= Gypsy Abbott =

American actress

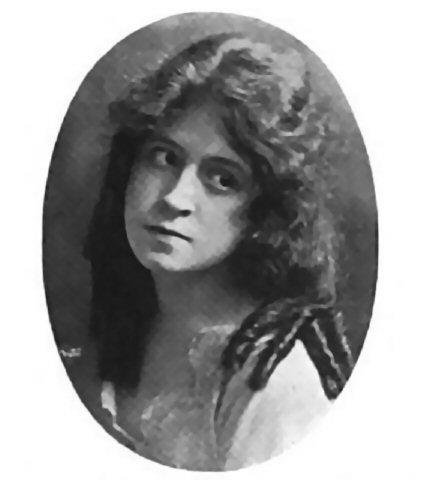
- Who's Who in the Film World, 1914
- Born: January 31, 1896; Atlanta, Georgia, U.S.
- Died: July 25, 1952 (aged 56); Hollywood, California, U.S.
- Other name: Gypsie Abbott
- Occupation: Actress
- Spouse: Henry King (m. 1915)
- Children: 3

Gypsy Abbott (January 31, 1896 – July 25, 1952) was an American stage and silent film actress.

== Personal life ==
Gypsy Abbott was born on January 31, 1896, in Atlanta, Georgia. She married director Henry King in 1915 at Balboa or in Fort Worth, Texas. In 1917, she quit acting to focus on her life at home. Between 1923 and 1930, they had three children, Frank, John, and Martha. In 1920 and 1930, Ruth King lived with the couple. She was born in Illinois in 1913 or 1914 and was identified as King's stepdaughter. By 1930, they lived on South Muirfield Road in Los Angeles, California. Henry's brother Louis lived with the Kings in 1925 and 1930. (Note: Ruth King, born May 12, 1912, stated to be the daughter of Henry and Gypsy King, left for Europe in October 1923, where the 10-year-old intended to study in France, Italy and Switzerland for two years. In 1925, Ruth was back living with Henry, Gypsy, and Louis King and the two-year-old son, Henry King, of Henry and Gypsy,)

== Career ==
Gypsy Abbott began her career as a singer, actor, and dancer. She performed for a number of years on stage and in vaudeville. She began with E. H. Sothern's repertoire company. Abbott performed in stock shows in Kansas City, St. Joseph, Missouri, and Chicago. While she was on the road, she met Henry King several times.

She did a fifteen-minute vaudeville act where she sang and would swing over the audience and toss roses into the crowd. She did a similar act at Fred Mace's Photoplayers Club at Balboa. She played in The Minister's Daughter and as Flora Belle Fry in a road production of George M. Cohan's Little Johnny Jones.

Abbott returned to California and King introduced her to Balboa Feature Film Company in Long Beach, and was hired to play in her first film. The Path of Sorrow (1913). Over the next four years, she played in several films for American Film Company in Santa Barbara and Balboa.

== Death ==
Abbott died of heart failure on July 25, 1952, aged 55. She is buried in the Grotto Section at Holy Cross Cemetery in Culver City, California. At the time of her death, her children were Ruth King Hilbert, Henry, and John.

== Filmography ==
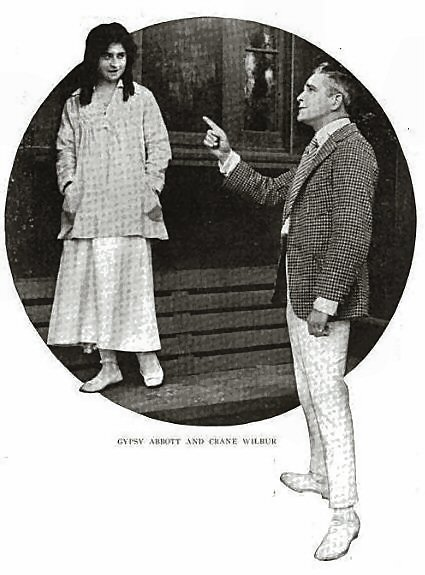
Gypsy Abbott and Crane Wilbur in Vengeance Is Mine (1916)

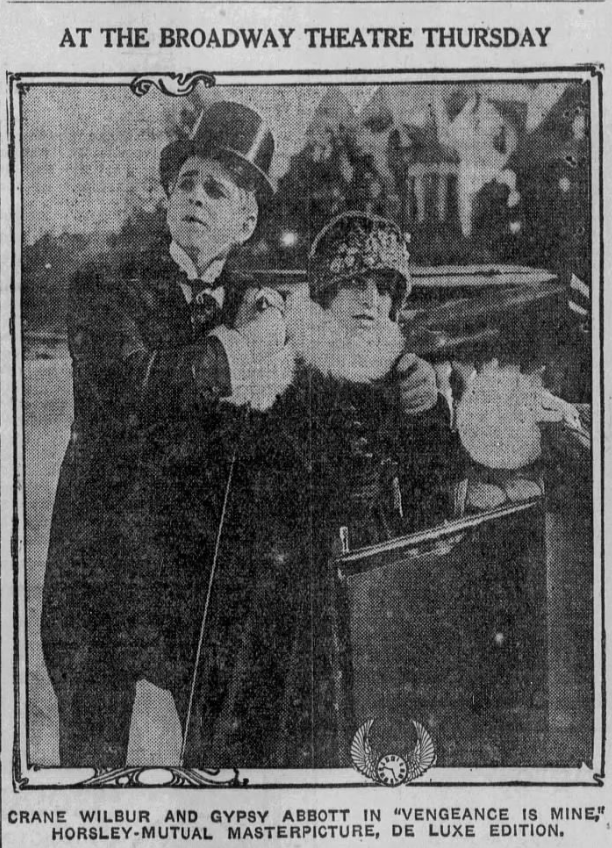
Gypsy Abbott and Crane Wilbur in Vengeance Is Mine (1916)

- The Path of Sorrow (1913), short film
- Called Back (1914)
- The Key to Yesterday (1914)
- The Man Who Could Not Lose (1914)
- St. Elmo (1914)
- Who Pays? (1915)
- Beulah (film)|Beulah (1915)
- For the Commonwealth (1915)
- Letters Entangled (1915)
- The Fruit of Folly (1915)
- Vengeance Is Mine! (1916)
- For Ten Thousand Bucks (1916)
- Bungling Bill's Dress Suit (1916)
- Some Liars (1916)
- Her Luckless Scheme (1916)
- Going to the Dogs (film)|Going to the Dogs (1916)
- Rolling to Ruin (1916)
- Paste and Politics (1916)
- A Touch of High Life (1916)
- Her Painted Pedigree (1916)
- Bungling Bill's Bow-Wow (1916)
- Lost, Strayed or Stolen (film)|Lost, Strayed or Stolen (1916)
- With or Without (1916)
- The Wicked City (1916 film)|The Wicked City (1916)
- Shot in the Fracas (1916)
- Jealous Jolts (1916)
- A Lislebank(1917)
- A Circus Cyclone (1917)
- The Musical Marvel (1917)
- The Butcher's Nightmare (1917)
- A Studio Stampede (1917)
- His Bogus Boast (1917)
- When Ben Bolted (1917)
- Lorelei of the Sea (1917)

== Bibliography ==
- King, Henry; Shepard, David; Perry, Ted; Thompson, Frank T. (1995). Henry King, director : from silents to ʼscope. Los Angeles: Directors Guild of America. pp. 24–25. ISBN 978-1-882766-03-1.
