= St. Elmo (1923 British film) =

1923 film directed by Rex Wilson

- Directed by: Rex Wilson
- Based on: St. Elmo by Augusta Jane Evans
- Starring: Shayle Gardner; Gabrielle Gilroy; Madge Tree
- Release date: 1923
- Country: United Kingdom
- Language: Silent (English intertitles)

St. Elmo is a 1923 British silent drama film directed by Rex Wilson and starring Shayle Gardner, Gabrielle Gilroy and Madge Tree. It was an adaptation of the 1866 novel St. Elmo by Augusta Jane Evans. An American adaptation St. Elmo was released the same year.

== Cast ==
- Shayle Gardner as St. Elmo Murray
- Gabrielle Gilroy as Agnes Powell
- Madge Tree as Mrs Murray
- Harding Thomas as Reverend Hammond
- Elton Sinclair as Mr Wilru
