= St. Elmo's Fire (disambiguation) =

St. Elmo's fire is an electrical phenomenon.

St. Elmo's Fire may also refer to:

- St. Elmo's Fire (film), a 1985 film
- "St. Elmo's Fire (Man in Motion)", a 1985 single by John Parr, the theme song for the film
- "Love Theme from St. Elmo's Fire", a 1985 single by David Foster, also from the film
- "St. Elmo's Fire", a song from the 1975 album Another Green World by Brian Eno
- "St. Elmo's Fire", a song from the 1975 album The Art of Tea by Michael Franks

== See also ==
- St. Elmo (disambiguation)
