= Erasmus (given name) =

Erasmus is a masculine given name. It is borne by:

- Erasmus of Arcadia, 18th century Greek Orthodox bishop
- Erasmus of Formia (died c. 303), Christian saint and martyr
- Erasmus of Lueg, 15th century Slovenian robber baron, famed for being besieged in Predjama Castle
- Erasmus Burt (c. 1820–1861), American physician, politician, and Confederate colonel
- Erasme Louis Surlet de Chokier (1769–1839), Belgian politician
- Erasmus Darwin (1731–1802), English physician and poet, grandfather of Charles Darwin
- Erasmus Alvey Darwin (1804–1881), brother of Charles Darwin
- Erasmus Darwin IV (1881–1915), son of Horace Darwin, grandson of Charles Darwin
- Erasmus Darwin Fenner (1807–1866), American physician
- Erasmus Finx (1627–1694), aka Erasmus Francisci, German polymath, author, and writer of Christian hymns
- Erasmus Gower (1742–1814), British naval officer and colonial governor
- Erasmus Grasser (c. 1450–c. 1515), German master builder and sculptor
- Erasmus James (born 1982), American football player
- Erasmus D. Keyes (1810–1895), American businessman, banker, and general
- Erasmus Reinhold (1511–1553), German astronomer and mathematician
- Erasmus Richardson (1810–1892), American politician
- Erasmus Sarcerius (1501–1559), German Protestant thinker
- Erasmus Smith (1611–1691), English merchant, landowner, and philanthropist

== See also ==
- Rasmus (given name), a shortened form of the name
- Elmo (given name), a name derived from Erasmus
- Rassie, a name derived from Erasmus
