= Delmo =

Delmo may refer to:

== Given name ==
- Delmo Alberghini (1922–2013), American hurdler
- Delmo Delmastro (born 1936), Argentine cyclist
- Delmo da Silva (1954–2010), Brazilian sprinter
- Delmo (footballer) (born 1973), Delmo Arcângelo Coelho Monteiro, Brazilian footballer

== Places ==
- Delmo Community Center, historic community centre in Homestown, Missouri

== See also ==
- Elmo (disambiguation)
