= MidTown (Columbus, Georgia) =

Coordinates: 32°28′20″N 84°57′30″W

- Neighborhood
- Interactive map of MidTown
- Country: United States
- State: Georgia
- County: Muscogee

Population (2009)
  - Total: 22,000
- Postal codes: 31906 and 31901
- Area code: 706

Midtown Logo

Midtown (not to be mistaken for Midtown, New York) has an area of six square miles in Columbus, Georgia. It possesses residential neighbourhoods, eleven public schools, the Columbus Museum, the Columbus Public Library, the Muscogee County Public Education Center, the Columbus Aquatic Center and the international headquarters for Aflac. The population of Midtown is 22,000 residents living in 8500 households and is 10 kilometres north of Fort Benning on I-185.

Midtown's boundaries are Talbotton (pronounced Tawl-but-ton) and Warm Springs Roads to the north; I-185 to the east; Martin Luther King, Jr. Boulevard to the south; and 10th Avenue to the west. Midtown is centrally located to Columbus' many cycling amenities; Fall Line Trace bike trail parallels Midtown's northern boundary and the 14-mile (23 km) Riverwalk is one mile (1.6 km) away.

== History ==
Shortly after the founding of Columbus, Georgia in 1828, wealthy Columbites began to look beyond the original city limits to build suburban estates and gardens. While many of the owners of these suburban villas had working plantations in other areas, these estates were for their urban-based businesses like law, commerce, or manufacturing.

After the American Civil War, the invention of the street-car made suburban life possible for more Americans. In 1887, John F. Flournoy and Louis F. Garrard purchased the Columbus Railroad Company and created the Belt Line trolley, "a coke-burning, steam-powered dummy engine [that] pulled one or two cars eastward from downtown out 10th Street up the hill into Wynton, turning north at Wynton School, circling around the northern edge of the new Wildwood Park and returning to downtown on 18th Street." In that same year, the two partners formed the Muscogee Real Estate Company and began to subdivide lots for residential development.

Many factors contributed to the boom of development that occurred in Midtown in the early part of the 20th century. Population increases, national trends, a growing middle-class, and a fire that destroyed one and a half blocks of houses in downtown Columbus, pushed people outside the city limits. After World War I and the creation of Fort Benning, Midtown flourished and it was at this time that the majority of Midtown was developed. Other Columbus entrepreneurs followed the example of John Flournoy and began carving neighbourhoods out of once rural land. In 1925, the completion of the thirteenth street viaduct made automobile access easier and in that same year the city limits of Columbus grew to include the rapidly developing Midtown area.

== Neighborhoods and historic districts ==
Midtown is home to nineteen established neighbourhood associations.

Six National Register historic districts radiate from Wynton Road in the heart of Midtown, creating one of the largest contiguous historic districts in the United States:

- Dinglewood Historic District
- Peacock Woods-Dimon Circle Historic District
- Weracoba-St. Elmo Historic District
- Wildwood Circle-Hillcrest Historic District
- Wynnton Village Historic District
- Wynn's Hill-Overlook Historic District

=== Dinglewood Historic District ===
The Dinglewood Historic District is a small, residential neighborhood comprising the c. 1859 Dingle wood house; early 20th –century residences; a privately owned, central, circular park; and a city-owned park. The district developed around Dinglewood, the two-story, Italianate-style house designed for Colonel Joel Early Hurt. The 30-acre (120,000 m^{2}) estate was subdivided in the early 20th century, and sixteen houses were constructed between 1917 and 1951. Common house styles in the district include Georgian, Bungalow, Ranch, Colonial Revival, English Vernacular Revival, and Spanish Colonial Revival.

Dinglewood House (1429 Dingle wood Drive), a two-story, Italianate-style, Georgian house that was designed for Colonel Joel Early Hurt by Columbus architects and builders Barringer and Morton in 1858. Hurt spared no expense when building his home. He even installed private water and gas works on the property. Located on either side of the Dinglewood House are two c. 1858 houses reportedly built for the craftsman who constructed the Dinglewood House.

=== Peacock Woods-Demon Circle Historic District ===
The development of The Peacock Woods-Dimon Circle Historic District began in 1922. John Flournoy's Peacock Woods subdivision comprises the northern half of the district and Samuel Kelly Dimon's Dimon Circle subdivision, the southern portion. Flournoy, a prominent and prolific Columbus developer, hired the nationally acclaimed landscape architect Earle S. Draper to design Peacock Woods as a picturesque neighbourhood with curving streets and park-like settings. Dimon Circle was subdivided from Dimon's family property in 1922. Additional lots were added to the development in 1928. The center of the district (known as Rock Park) was developed by Charles Frank Williams and the southwest portion (known as Wynnton Heights) was subdivided by Hezikiah Land. The district includes a broad range of architectural styles including Colonial Revival, Craftsman, English Vernacular Revival, Spanish Colonial Revival and one 1954 California Ranch.

=== Weracoba-St. Elmo Historic District ===
The history of the District begins with the founding of Columbus and with the city's most famous antebellum mansion, St. Elmo, built circa 1830. Another smaller antebellum house, Highland Hall, dating from the 1850s, is also within the District. Both structures are listed in the National Register, and they illustrate the area's original use as a setting for suburban estates prior to the American Civil War. Today, the Weracoba / St. Elmo Historic District is a vibrant multi-use residential, recreational, educational, and commercial area with a strong sense of community among its residents. Its canopy of mature hardwood trees shelters the city's- and one of the state's-largest and most intact 1920s/1930s concentration of middle-class Craftsman Bungalow, Tudor Revival, Classical, and Mission Revival style homes. Of the 440 surviving houses in the District, 85% were constructed by 1941.

=== Wildwood Circle-Hillcrest Historic District ===
An early 20th century streetcar suburb—continued to develop through the mid-1950s. In the 1880s, a streetcar line was constructed along Wildwood Avenue to serve the Wynnton area. Owner of the streetcar line and the Muscogee Real Estate Company, John Francis Flournoy, built his own Queen Anne estate here as he developed the Wildwood Circle subdivision. Sale of lots along the streetcar line peaked from 1918 to 1925. Also within this district—at 1519 Stark Avenue—is the childhood home of Carson McCullers (1917–1967) the renowned novelist and playwright. Some of the architectural styles in this district include Colonial Revival, English Vernacular Revival, Mission/Spanish Revival, and Craftsman.

=== Village of Wynnton Historic District ===
An example of an early- to mid-20th-century residential neighborhood developed from antebellum estates and in response to the streetcar line which ran along the southern and eastern boundaries of the district. The evolution of Wynnton Village spans over 150 years from its antebellum estates, to its village center developed in the mid-19th century, to the beginning of streetcar suburbs in the 1890s, to intense residential development from 1919 through the 1940s and then serving as a prime location for multi-family dwellings for World War II-era Fort Benning officers. Architectural styles vary from early examples of Greek and Gothic Revival to popular early 20th century styles including Craftsman, Colonial Revival and English Vernacular Revival.

=== Wynn's Hill-Overlook Historic District ===
An example of an early- to mid-20th-century residential neighbourhood developed from several antebellum estates. In 1834, Colonel William L. Wynn purchased 100 acres (0.40 km^{2}) of land located on a rise east of downtown Columbus, just beyond the city limits. Wynnton Road was an important thoroughfare that also served as the early property line that divided Wynn's land from John Woolfolk's land (portions of which were later sold to Joel Early Hurt, builder of Dinglewood, among others). During the 1920s, a majority of the district was purchased and developed by Lloyd G. Bowers who hired nationally acclaimed landscape architect Earle S. Draper to design a picturesque neighbourhood. Draper's signature style of curvilinear streets and park-like settings can also be seen in the Peacock Woods-Dimon Circle Historic District and in the 1920s expansion of the village at the Bibb Mill (located outside of MidTown). With the incorporation of the larger Wynnton area into the city limits in the mid-1920s, residential construction boomed; a second peak in building occurred in the 1940s. Some of the architectural styles in this district include Greek Revival, Neoclassical Revival, Colonial Revival, Craftsman, English Vernacular Revival, Mediterranean Revival and Post Modern.

== Parks and recreation ==
MidTown's curvilinear tree-lined streets and pocket parks were integral to its original residential development and design and define part of MidTown's unique character today. Weracoba Park, also known as Lakebottom Park, is the oldest, large-scale, daily use recreation facility and public greenspace within the city. It began in 1890 as a private park with a shallow lake, dance pavilion, a small bowling alley and zoo; in 1924, the city purchased the park, a part of it became the site of Columbus High School, Lakebottom Park's lake was drained and the remainder became officially Weracoba Park, taking its new name from the creek that winds through it. Today, Weracoba Park expands over 40 tree-filled acres that incorporate ball fields, tennis courts, a basketball court, playground and tracks for walking and running and is used by 10,000 people a day.

The work of two of America's early 20th century landscape architects is present in MidTown. Gardens surrounding the Columbus Museum were designed in the 1920s by the firm of Frederick Law Olmsted; and Earle Draper designed the curving streets and pocket parks of Peacock Woods.

MidTown is also centrally located to Columbus' many cycling amenities: the Fall Line Trace bike trail parallels MidTown's northern boundary and access to the 14-mile (23 km) Riverwalk is one mile (1.6 km) to the west.

== Cultural, civic and educational attractions ==
The Columbus Museum, the second largest museum in the state, and known for its focus on American art and regional history, is on the west end of Wynnton Road in MidTown. The Columbus Public Library, 100,000-square-foot (9,300 m^{2}) facility designed by architect Robert Stern, and the Muscogee County School District's Public Education Center (that opened in 2009) anchor MidTown's eastern boundary on Macon Road near I-185.

Eleven public schools are within MidTown's boundaries; Wynnton Arts Academy, founded in 1837 as Wynnton Academy, is the oldest continuously used elementary school in Georgia and among the oldest in the country.

== Shopping and dining ==
Two of the city's early suburban shopping centres—the Village on 13th and St. Elmo—are located in MidTown were renovated to host many shops. Various other shops, galleries and services can be found throughout the MidTown area.

Regional and national chain stores are centred in the Cross Country area on Macon Road at I-185.

== See also ==
- Columbus, Georgia
- Downtown Columbus, Georgia
