= Madge Tree =

British actress (1875–1947)

- Born: 1875; West Derby, Liverpool, England
- Died: 1947 (aged 71–72); Paddington, London, England

Madge Tree (1875–1947) was a British actress of the silent era.

She was born in West Derby, Liverpool and died in Paddington, London.

== Selected filmography ==
- Hard Times (1915)
- What Every Woman Knows (1917)
- The Garden of Resurrection (1919)
- The Silver Bridge (1920)
- Won by a Head (1920)
- Mary Find the Gold (1921)
- Fires of Innocence (1922)
- The House of Peril (1922)
- The Disappearance of Lady Frances Carfax (1923)
- Woman to Woman (1923)
- St. Elmo (1923)
- A Daughter of Love (1925)
