= Telmo =

Telmo is a masculine given name and surname which may refer to:

== Given name ==
- Telmo Aldaz (born 1970), Spanish globetrotter and media personality
- Telmo Arcanjo (born 2001), Cape Verdean football midfielder
- Telmo Carbajo (1889–1948), Peruvian footballer and manager
- Telmo Castanheira (born 1992), Portuguese football midfielder
- Telmo Correia (born 1960), Portuguese politician, Secretary of State for Internal Administration since 2024 and former Minister of Tourism
- Telmo Languiller (born 1957), Australian politician
- Telmo Pinto (born 1971), Portuguese former football midfielder
- Telmo Pires (born 1953), American soccer defender
- Telmo Teixeira-Rebelo (born 1988), Portuguese-German footballer
- Telmo Vargas (1912 –2013), Ecuadorian Chief of Staff of the Armed Forces of Ecuador who overthrew the military junta of Ramón Castro Jijón in 1966
- Telmo Zarra (1921 –2006), Spanish football forward
- Telmo (Brazilian footballer) (born 1975), Brazilian football left-back Telmo Além da Silva

== Surname ==
- Cottinelli Telmo (1897–1948), Portuguese architect, filmmaker, poet, artist and musician
- Pedro González Telmo (1190-1246), Castilian friar and priest

== See also ==
- San Telmo (disambiguation)
- Elmo (disambiguation)
