= Rassie =

Rassie is a nickname , often a shortened form of the names Erasmus:

- Rassie Erasmus (born 1972), South African rugby union coach and former player
- Rassie Pieterse (born 1983), South African field hockey goalkeeper
- Rassie van der Dussen (born 1989), South African cricketer
- Rassie Jansen van Vuuren (born 1985), South African rugby union player

== Given name ==
- Rassie Hoskins White (1862–1944), American clubwoman
