= St. Elmo (1923 American film) =

1923 film directed by Jerome Storm

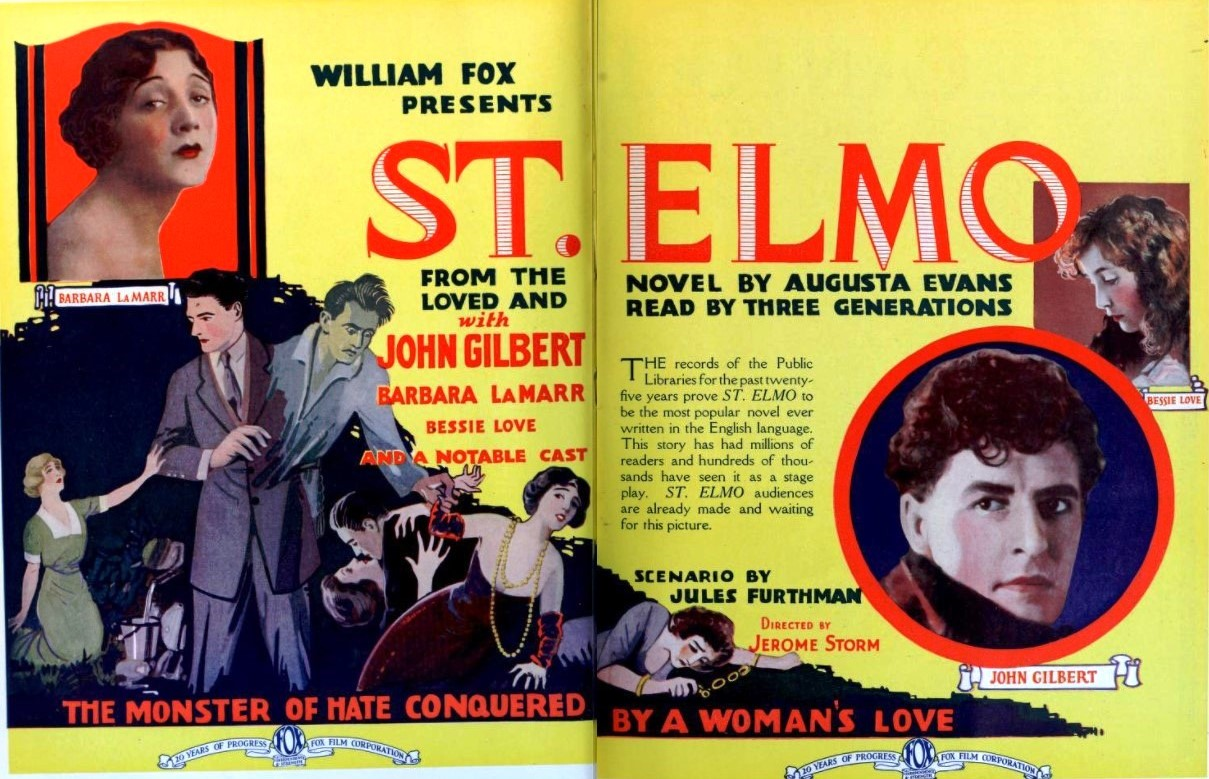
- Advertisement
- Directed by: Jerome Storm
- Written by: Jules G. Furthman
- Based on: St. Elmo (novel) by Augusta Jane Evans
- Starring: John Gilbert; Barbara La Marr; Bessie Love
- Cinematography: Joseph H. August
- Distributed by: Fox Film Corporation
- Release date: September 30, 1923 (U.S.)
- Running time: 60 minutes
- Country: United States
- Language: Silent (English intertitles)

St. Elmo is a 1923 American silent drama film directed by Jerome Storm. Distributed by Fox Film Corporation, the film is based on the 1866 novel of the same name written by Augusta Jane Evans.

== Plot ==
When St. Elmo Thornton catches his fiancée, Agnes, in the arms of his best friend, Murray Hammond, he shoots Hammond in a duel and decides to travel around the world in hopes of forgetting women. Upon returning, he meets Edna, the blacksmith's daughter who is living with his minister. In the end, St. Elmo becomes a minister and marries Edna.

== Cast ==
- John Gilbert as St. Elmo Thornton
- Barbara La Marr as Agnes Hunt
- Bessie Love as Edna Earle
- Warner Baxter as Murray Hammond
- Nigel De Brulier as Reverend Alan Hammond
- Lydia Knott as Mrs. Thornton

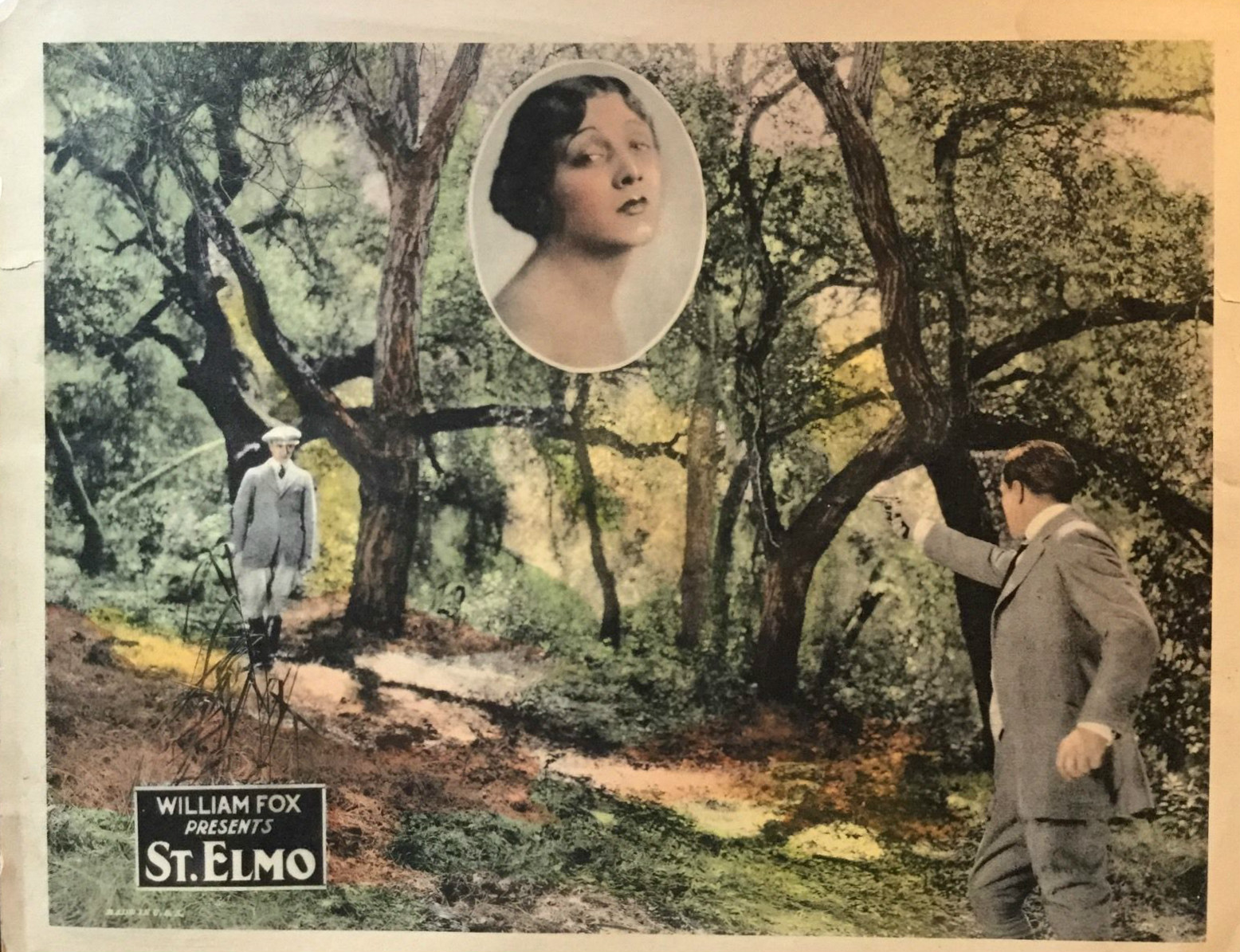
Lobby card of the duel

== Production ==
During the filming of St. Elmo, John Gilbert and Barbara La Marr had an "intense sexual affair", though he was married to Leatrice Joy.

A British adaptation of the same source material was made the same year.

== Preservation ==
With no prints of St. Elmo located in any film archives, it is a lost film.

== See also ==
- List of lost films
- 1937 Fox vault fire
