= Who Pays? =

American TV game show (1959)

- Genre: Game show
- Directed by: Jerome Schnur
- Presented by: Mike Wallace
- Announcer: Pat Hernon
- Country of origin: United States

Production
- Producer: Jerome Schnur

Original release
- Network: NBC
- Release: July 2 – September 24, 1959

Who Pays? is an American television game show that was broadcast on NBC from July 2, 1959, to September 24, 1959.

== Format ==
Three panelists interview a pair of contestants whose employer is a celebrity or a public figure, with the object of identifying the person for whom the contestants work. Each panelist has one minute to ask questions, after which the panelists discuss whether they can identify the employer. If they identify the celebrity correctly, the contestants share a $100 prize. Incorrect identification results in $200 for the pair of contestants. If the panelists conclude that they do not have enough information to name the employer, a second round of interviews occurs, with the contestants splitting $200 with a correct identification or $400 if the identification was incorrect.

TV viewers can see each celebrity employer, as the person is in range of the camera but not visible to the panel. Celebrities whose employees appeared on Who Pays? include Red Buttons, Betty Furness, Hal March, Audrey Meadows, and Cornelia Otis Skinner.

== Personnel ==
Mike Wallace is the host of Who Pays?. Panelists are Gene Klavan, Cedric Hardwicke, and Celeste Holm. Pat Hernon is the announcer.

== Production ==
Who Pays? is a Lester Lewis production. Jerome Schnur was the producer and director. It was broadcast live from New York on Thursdays from 8 to 8:30 p.m. Eastern Time. Purex Corporation was the sponsor, advertising Old Dutch cleanser, Sweetheart soap, and Trend detergent.

== Critical response ==
Richard F. Shepard, in a review in The New York Times, described the premiere episode of Who Pays? as "an innocuous half-hour that would leave no one on the edge of his seat, except perhaps those on the verge of going out to enjoy the evening." He added that Wallace and the panelists "All have been seen to better advantage," and summarized by commenting that the program "didn't seem very novel or exciting."

A review by United Press International writer William Ewald said that Who Pays? "is in many ways a remarkable show — remarkably sluggish, remarkably dull, remarkably inane." He added that the panel's successful identification of an employer in the premiere episode "could be labeled a tour de farce."

A review in the trade publication Variety called Who Pays? "a dullish variation of What's My Line?" and "mild summer fare". It went on to point out that suspense was limited, as panelists faced little challenge in making identifications.
