= Ashland Place Historic District (Mobile, Alabama) =

Historic district in Alabama, United States

- U.S. National Register of Historic Places
- U.S. Historic district
- Interactive map of Ashland Place Historic District
- Location: Mobile, Alabama
- Area: 40 acres (16 ha)
- Built: 1907
- Architects: Hutchisson, Clarence Sr.; Et al.
- Architectural style: Late 19th And 20th Century Revivals, Bungalow/Craftsman, Late Victorian
- NRHP reference No.: 87000935
- Added to NRHP: 23 June 1987

The Ashland Place Historic District is a historic district in the city of Mobile, Alabama, United States. The neighborhood gained its name from a Greek Revival antebellum house called Ashland that once stood on Lanier Avenue. Ashland was famous as the home of Augusta Evans Wilson. The house burned in 1926. The Ashland Place Historic District was placed on the National Register of Historic Places on June 23, 1987. It is roughly bounded by Spring Hill Avenue, Ryan Avenue, Old Shell Road, and Levert Avenue. The district covers 400 acres (1.6 km^{2}) and contains 93 contributing buildings. The majority of the buildings date to the early 20th century and cover a variety of historical architectural styles ranging from late Victorian to the Craftsman styles.

Houses in Ashland Place
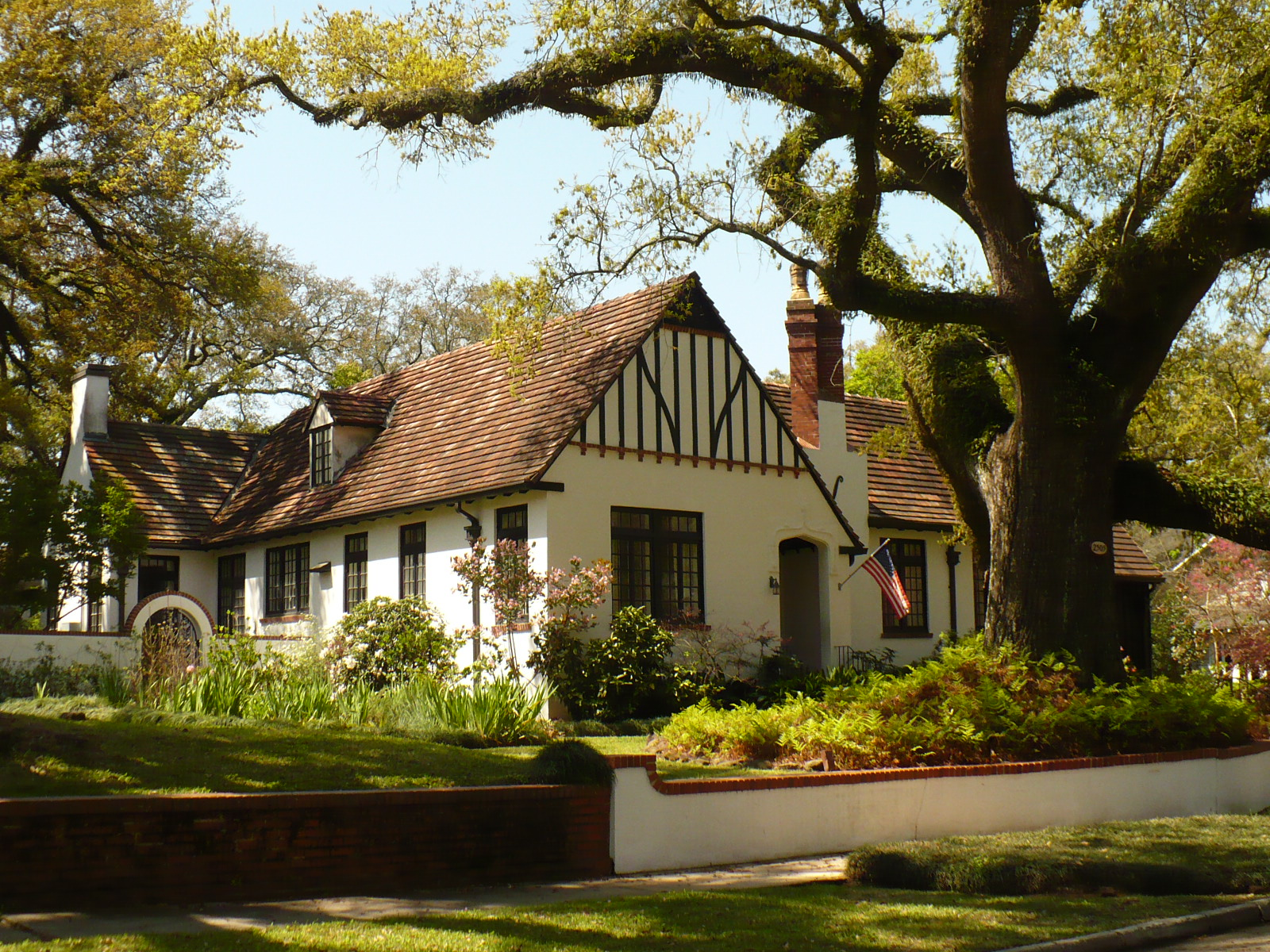

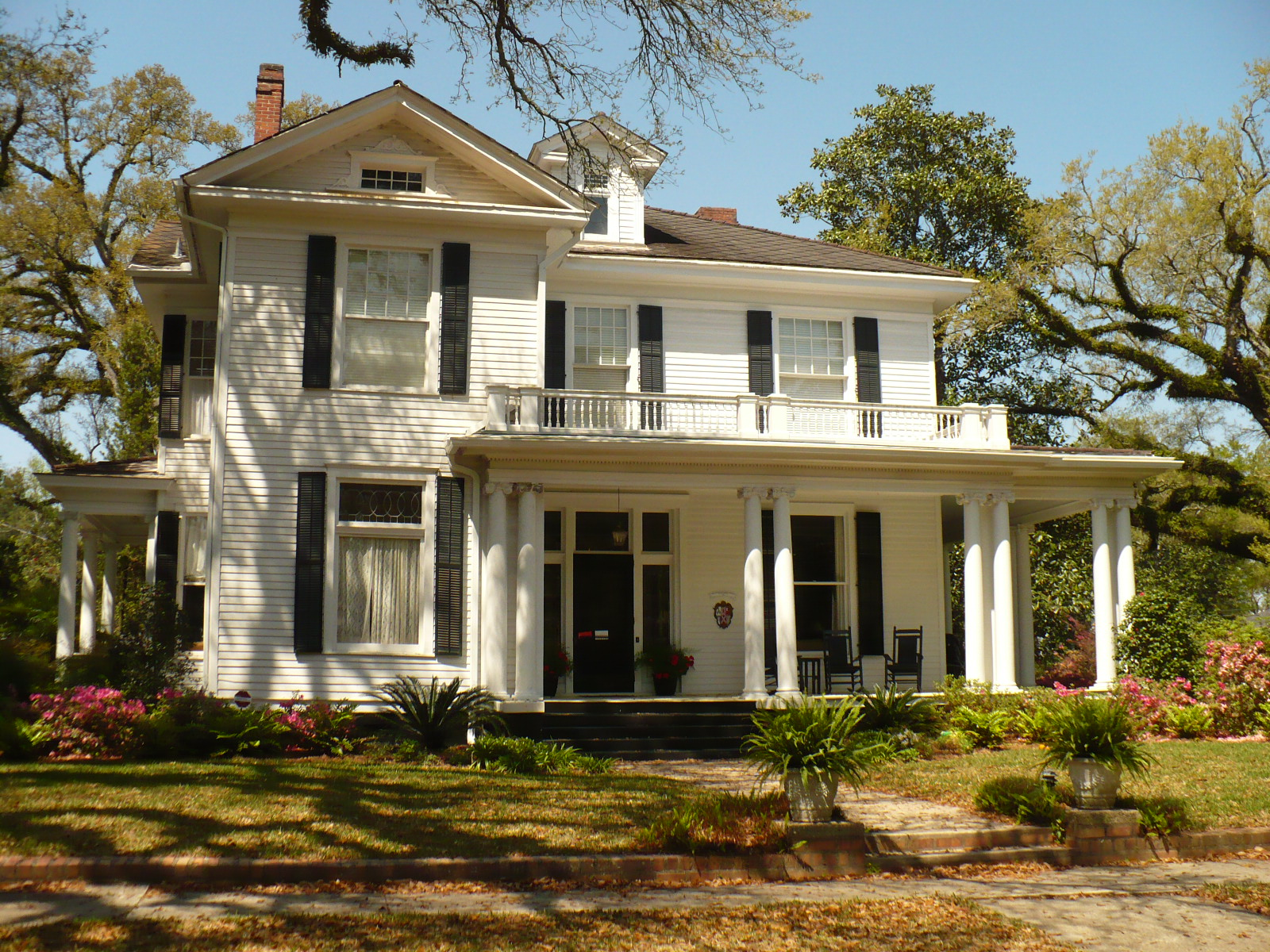

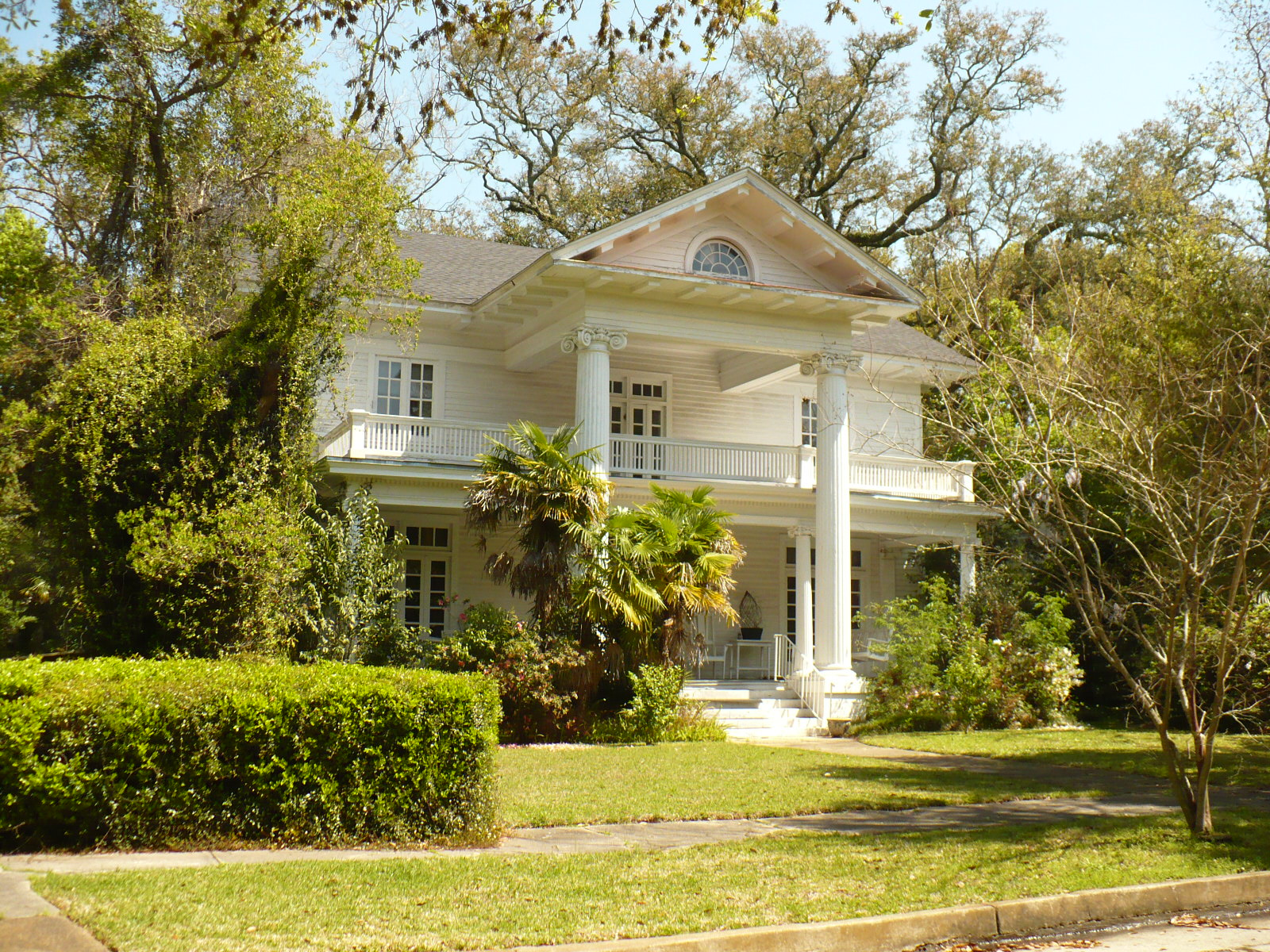

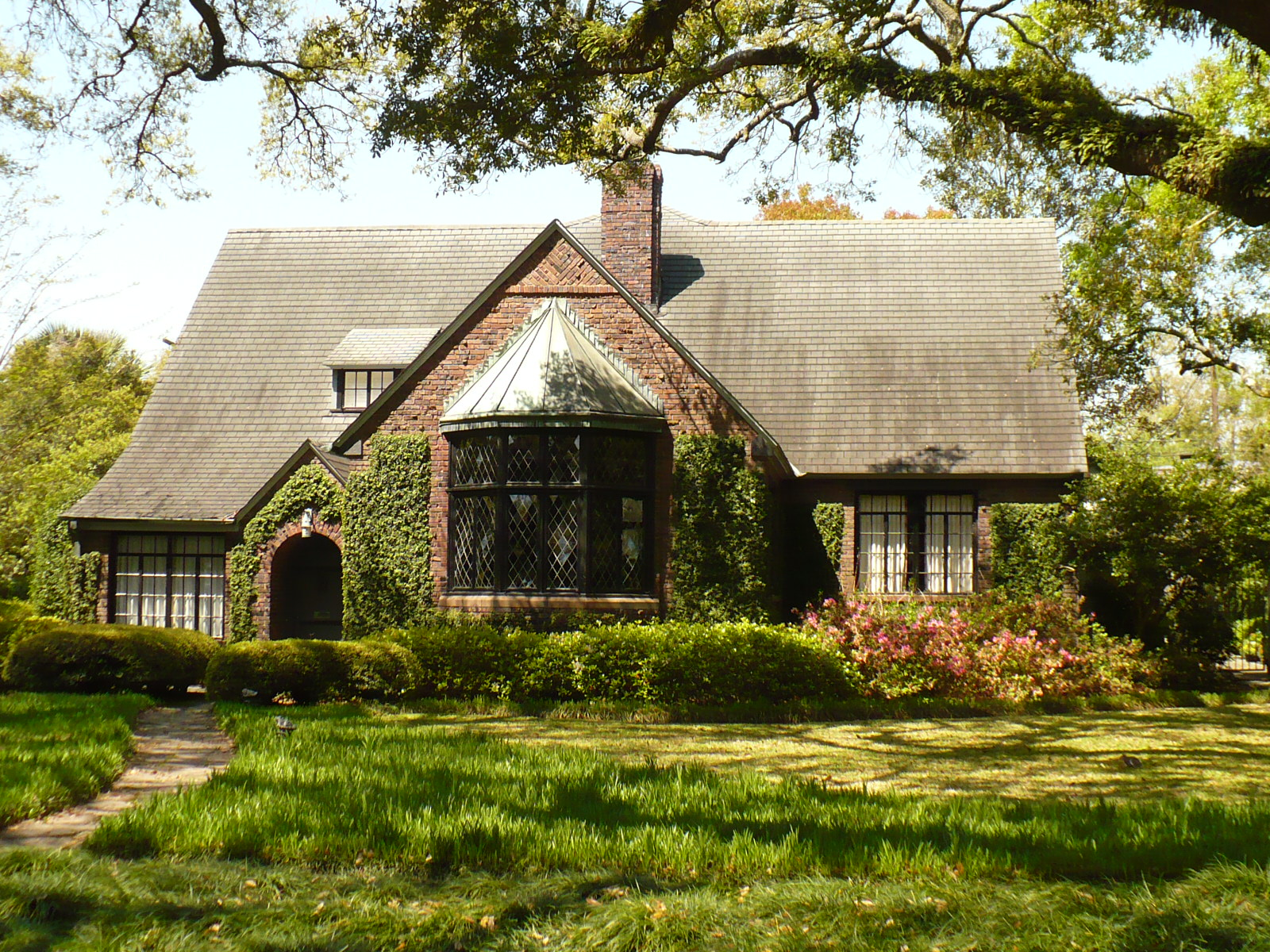

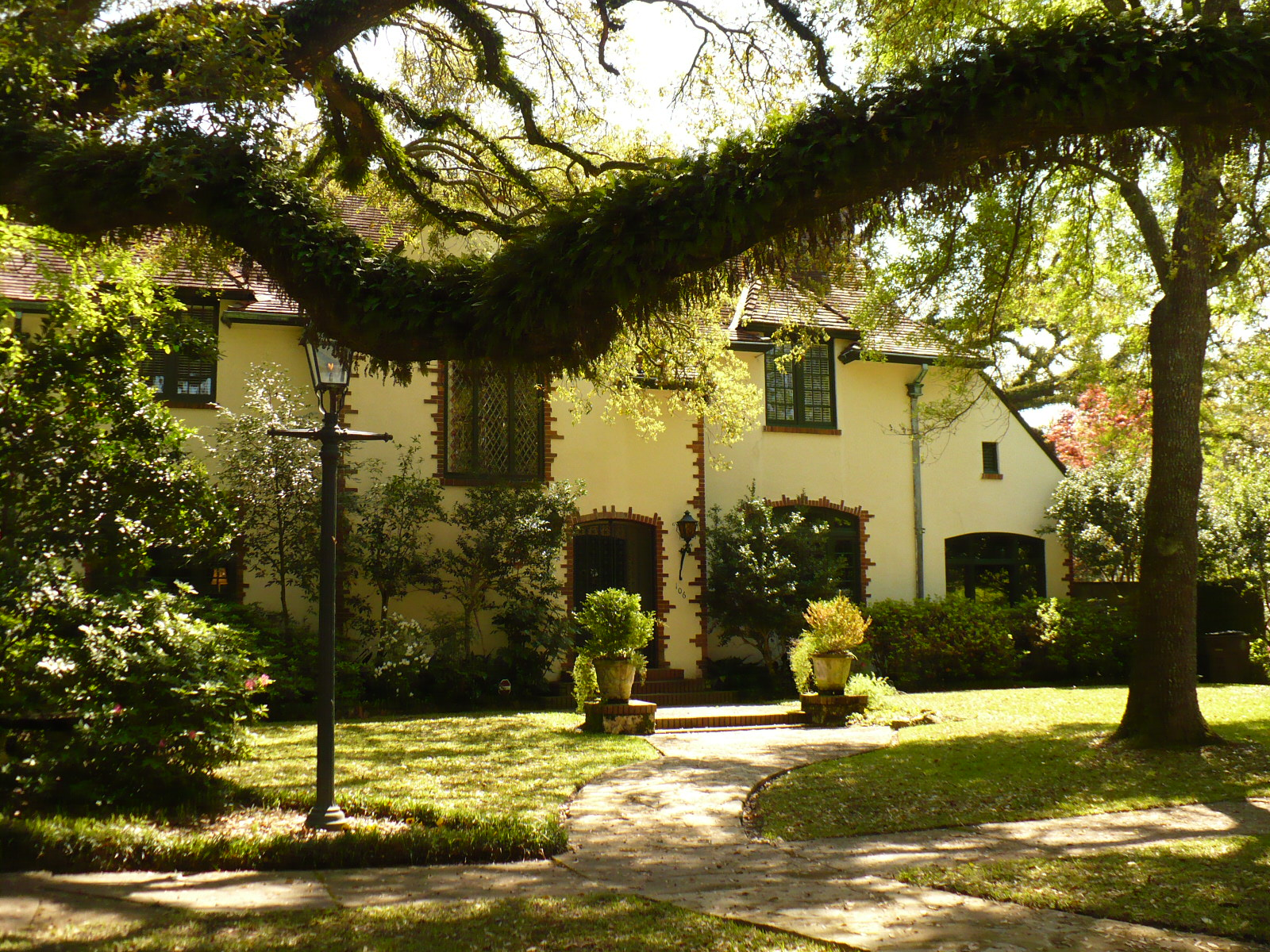

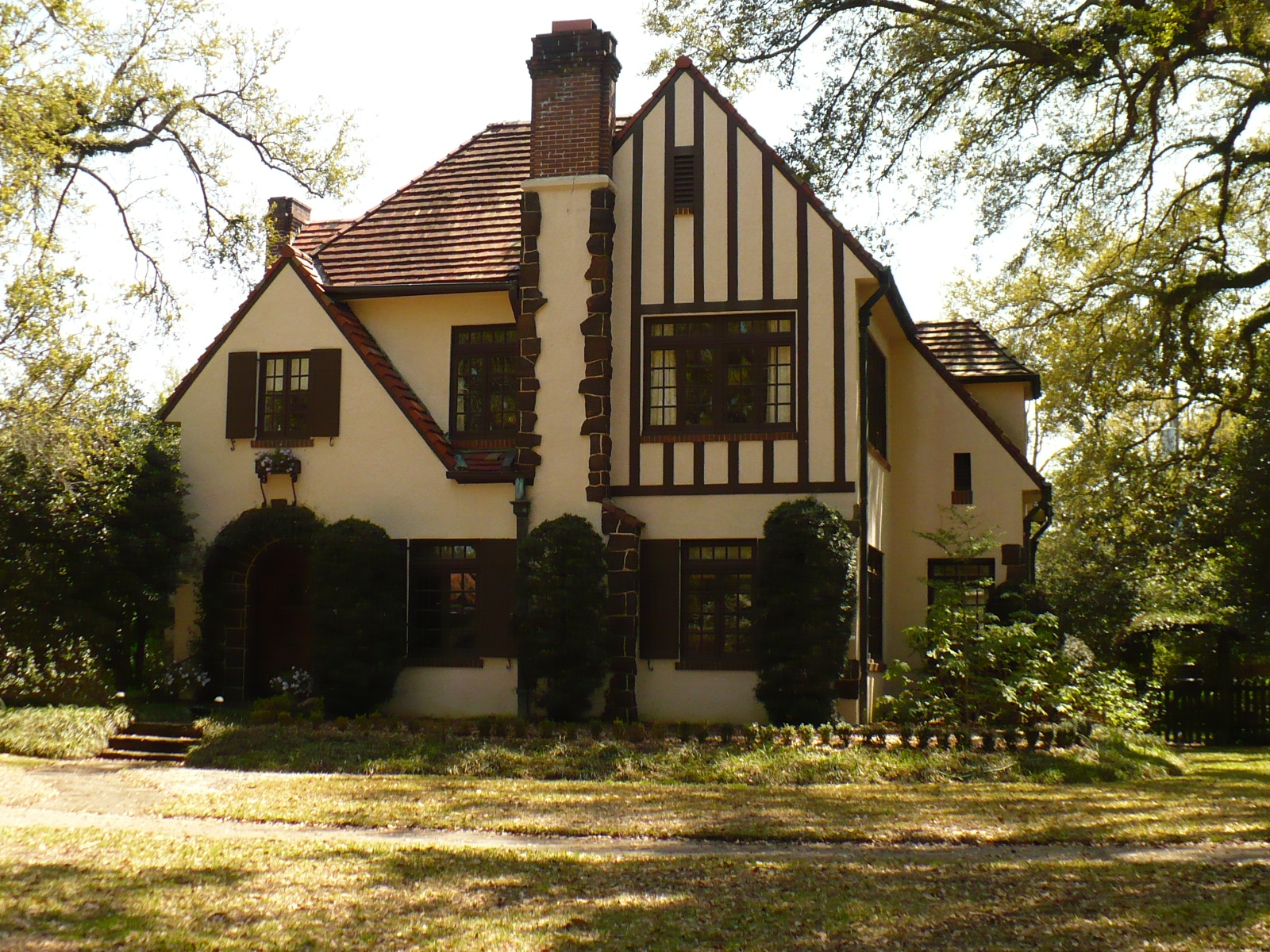
