= San Telmo Bridge =

Concrete bridge in Seville, Spain

San Telmo Bridge Puente de San Telmo
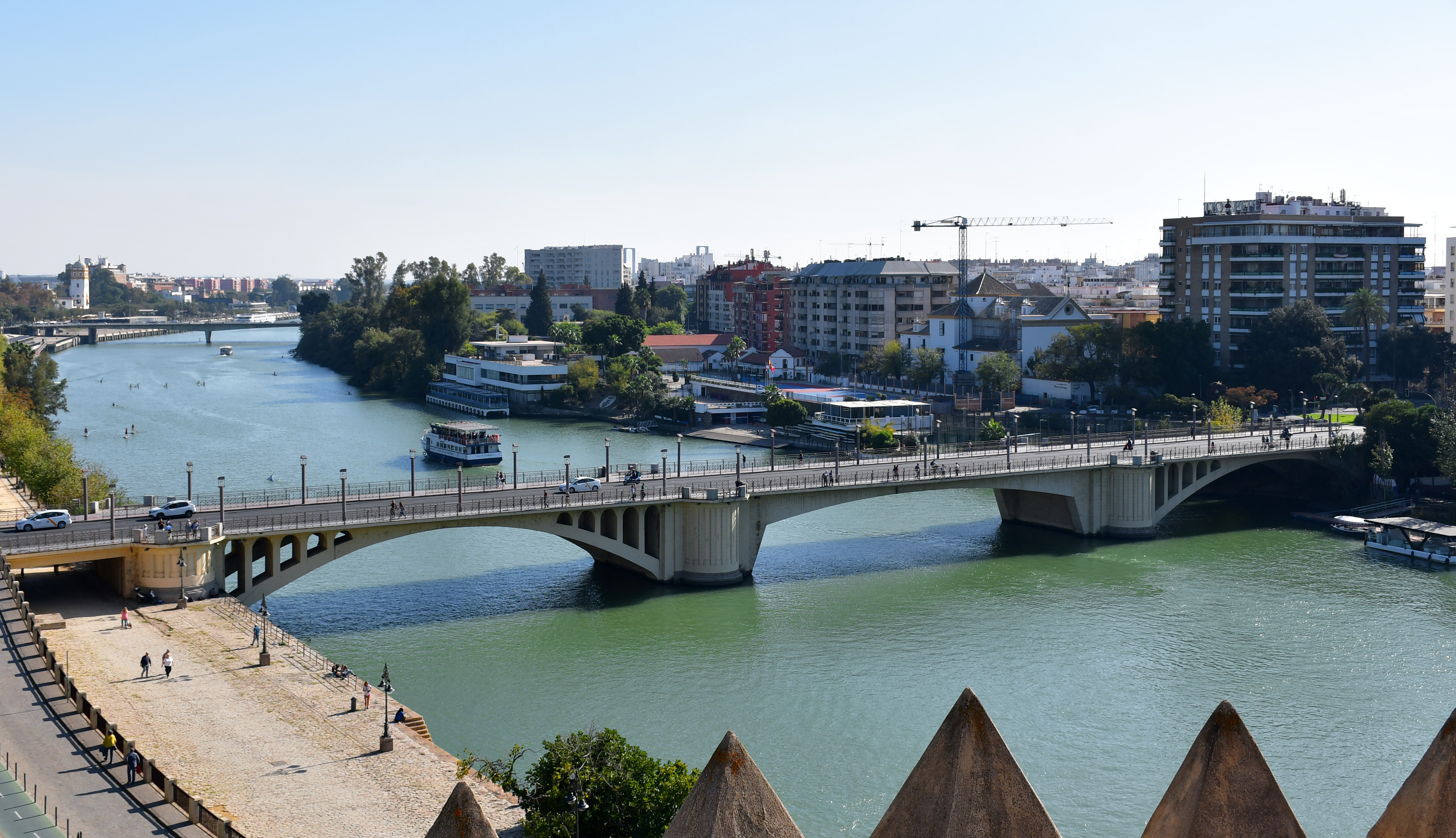
- The bridge, as seen from the top of Torre del Oro in 2019
- Coordinates: 37°22′51″N 5°59′47″W
- Crosses: Guadalquivir

Characteristics
- Width: 15 meters
- Clearance below: 7 meters

History
- Architect: José Eugenio Ribera
- Built: 1925 - 1931

The San Telmo Bridge is a concrete bridge located in Seville, Spain. It was inaugurated in 1931, and crosses the Guadalquivir.

== Background and construction ==
The first bridge in the city was the Puente de Barcas, which was replaced in 1852 by the current Puente de Triana, officially called the Isabel II Bridge. On March 15, 1880, a railway bridge called Alfonso XII was inaugurated. In order to solve the water problem, in 1882 the Seville City Council gave a 99-year concession to the Seville Water Works Company to supply water to the people of Seville. Among the infrastructures created by this company was an aqueduct over the Guadalquivir at the Plaza de Chapina that was inaugurated on April 23, 1898. This structure also allowed pedestrian passage and was known as Pasadera or Water Walkway.

In 1857 Seville had 112,529 registered inhabitants and in 1910 it reached 158,287 inhabitants. Of those residents, 30,000 lived on the western bank of the river, where the Triana neighborhood was located, and the city only had three bridges. In 1917, the engineer Antonio Ibarra Miró, from the Provincial Headquarters of Public Works of Seville, carried out a study to choose its location. The decision was made to do so in front of the Salón Cristina building, near the San Telmo Palace, because many buildings from the 1929 Ibero-American Exhibition would be located south of the center and it was thought that the opposite bank could be urbanized in the future. In this study, a highway was also proposed that would run along the current República Argentina Avenue and I know that it would extend to the neighborhood of La Pañoleta, in Camas. That highway would be the base of a route to Coria del Río, Huelva and Extremadura.

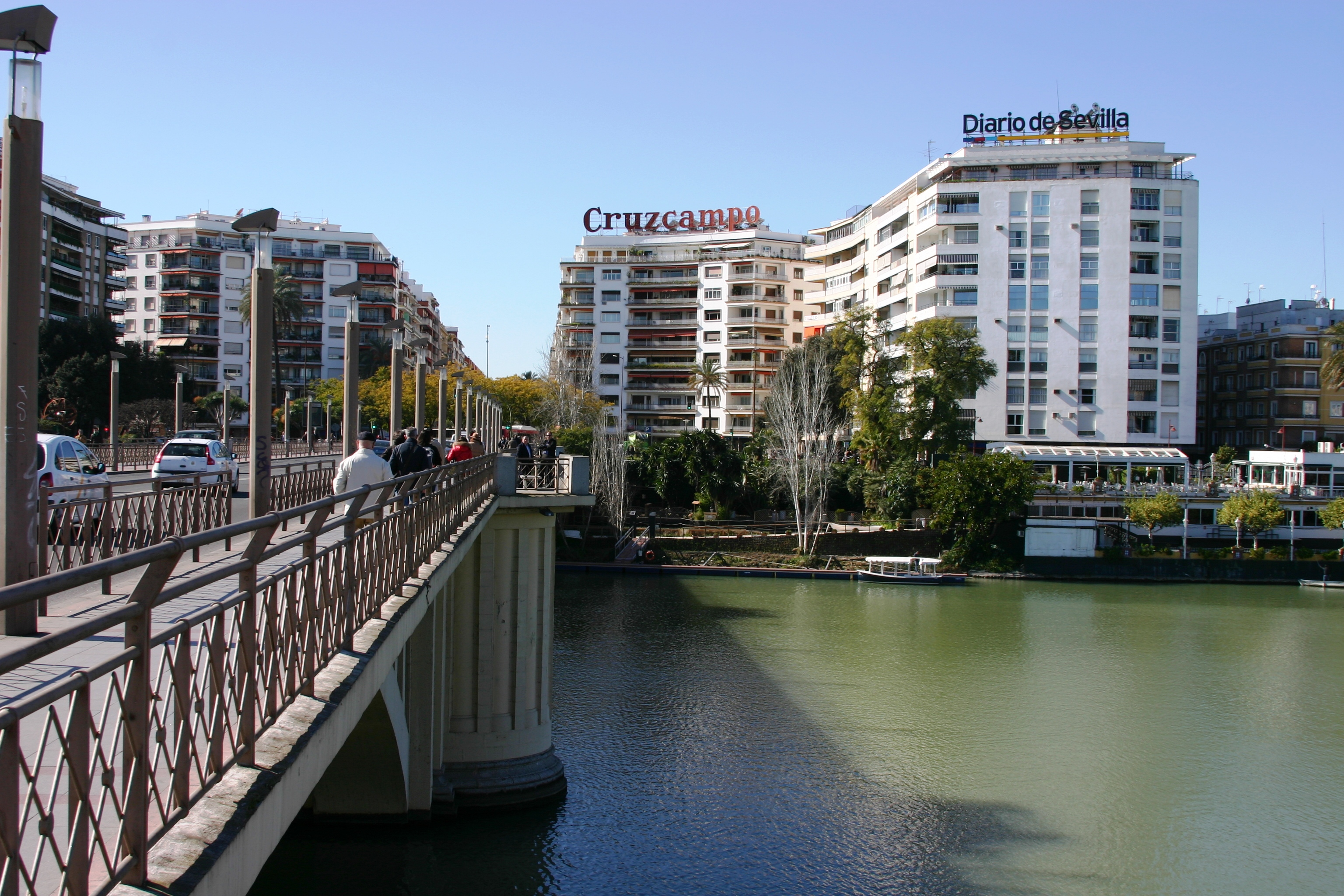
The guardrail of the bridge

The Public Works Headquarters of Seville called a public tender in which the French company Schneider y Cía submitted a bridge with metal sections that would cost 11 million pesetas, and the Spanish company Compañía de Construcciones Hidráulicas y Civiles, with a bridge that It cost 8 million. The latter was directed by the engineer José Eugenio Ribera. The General Directorate of Public Works chose the Ribera project. The General Directorate reduced the width of the bridge from 20 to 15 meters and eliminated many decorations that, if placed, should have been paid for by the City Council. The budget of the bridge, after this, became 5,821,318 pesetas.

The structural arrangement of the lateral arches had been used by the French engineer Paul Séjourné in his ashlar arches in Luxembourg and Toulouse. This type of arches in the bridge had already been used by Ribera in 1909 on the Queen Victoria Bridge over the Manzanares River in Madrid. The advantages of this type of arch led to it being considered a standard arch for arch bridges. of reinforced concrete for roads in 1924.

The central drawable section was designed and assembled by the Barcelona company La Maquinista Terrestre y Marítima. The bridge would be drawable to facilitate access for ships to the Arenal docks.

Before its construction, Alfonso XIII said he was concerned that the bridge would block the view of the Torre del Oro from the south of the city. After this comment, the bridge's grade was lowered three meters. This was possible because the Ministry of Development was carrying out at that time the cutting of the Vega de Triana in the Guadalquivir, and this implied that the arm of the river that passed through Seville would remain as a basin not subject to the river's floods.

Ribera had designed the bridge in 1920, in a period more prone to "modernist fantasies", when he collaborated with the architects Gustavo and Roberto Fernández Balbuena. However, when work was going to begin, these same architects considered that this design was out of fashion and the bridge was executed with much simpler lines. In 1920 there was an attempt to disguise the fact that it was a concrete bridge, but when the bridge was inaugurated in 1931, Ribera himself said that "The beauty of a bridge is obtained by the silhouette of its shapes and the proportions of its elements. Its concrete walls should not be hidden [...] We are in an era of constructive sincerity."

For construction, Ribera had the help of engineers Eduardo Torroja, José Entrecanales and Manuel Távora Barrera. The latter had demonstrated its expertise in reinforced concrete works with the loading dock for the Cala mines made for the Port of Seville in San Juan de Aznalfarache.

== Description ==
On August 13, 1931, after a load test, the bridge was opened to pedestrian traffic.

For the operation of the drawbridge, there had to be a permanent staff in charge of maneuvering the bridge and maintaining the machinery. The annual budget of the bridge for its maintenance in 1958 was 370,000 pesetas. The pavement in the drawbridge was made of wood and its upper part had to be renewed every 5 or 6 years. The last replacement took place in 1963. It cost 1,100,000 pesetas and was carried out by Juan Bocanegra Castro. The idea of making the bridge fixed was already raised in 1959. In October 1959, those responsible for the port and the state highways reached an agreement so that the bridge would be permanently lowered. However, in May 1960 the Ministry forced it to be drawn from 2 to 6 in the morning. In November 1961, the State ordered the night lifting to cease because it was necessary to repair the mechanism. After six months of repairs, it was noted that there were very few boats that went up the river beyond that point, with the exception of boats loaded with ice and fish.

In 1962, the Seville Construction Headquarters asked the Madrid Bridge Headquarters for a project to replace the mobile section of the bridge with a fixed one, and to provide the bridge with a new 18-meter platform (a 4-lane, 14-meter road). with two 2-meter steel beams). The project was carried out by engineer José Antonio Puyal Lezcano. In November 1963, the work was awarded to the Agromán company. The direction of the works was entrusted to the author of the project, who collaborated with Francisco Guerrero Martín Romero. In addition, the Agromán company put Rafael Romero Martínez in charge of the works. The works began in February 1964. The load, static and dynamic tests of the completed work took place on March 26, 1965. It was opened to the public days after these tests. In the 1960s the bridge was part of the SE-600 highway, which connected Seville with San Juan de Aznalfarache. In 1984 this road, and the bridge, passed into the hands of the Junta de Andalucía. The Department of Public Works and Transport renewed the railings and streetlights in 1992, before the Universal Exhibition of that year.

On April 27, 1994, the Junta de Andalucía transferred ownership of the bridge to the City Council of Seville. In 2006, a rehabilitation of the bridge was carried out, with a budget of 1.5 million euros. These works would finish at the end of 2007.

Currently the bridge has four lanes, two in each direction, as well as a sidewalk on each side, with a bicycle lane on one of them.

== See also ==
- List of bridges in Spain
