= Dinglewood, Columbus, Georgia =

- Dinglewood Historic District
- U.S. National Register of Historic Places
- U.S. Historic district
- Picture of famous Dinglewood Pharmacy's sign with the Aflac Tower in the background

- Location within Georgia Location within the United States
- Location: Bounded by 13th and 16th Ave., 13th St., and Wynnton Rd., Columbus, Georgia
- Built: 1858
- Architect: Barringer and Morton; Duncan, F. Roy, et al.
- Architectural style: Colonial Revival, Tudor Revival, multiple
- NRHP reference No.: 01001248
- Added to NRHP: November 21, 2001

Dinglewood is a neighborhood/subdistrict located at the southern edge of Midtown Columbus, Georgia. In it is the tallest building in Columbus, the Aflac Tower. It is also home to the famous Dinglewood Pharmacy, which serves, in the opinions of the city's residents, the city's best scrambled hot dog. The boundaries of the neighborhood are generally acknowledged to be 17th Street to the north, Martin Luther King Jr. Boulevard to the south, Interstate 185 to the east and Veterans Parkway to the west. In 2007, the estimated population of the area was 1,101.

It overlaps with Dinglewood Historic District, which is a historic district that was listed on the U.S. National Register of Historic Places in 2001.

It also includes Dinglewood House, a historic house at 1429 Dinglewood Avenue, which is listed on the U.S. National Register of Historic Places and Dinglewood Park.

== Dinglewood Historic District ==
The Dinglewood Historic District is a small, residential neighborhood comprising the c. 1859 Dinglewood house; early 20th-century residences; a privately owned, central, circular park; and a city-owned park. The district developed around Dinglewood, a two-story, Italianate-style house designed by Columbus architects Barringer and Morton for Colonel Joel Early Hurt. The 30-acre (120,000 m^{2}) estate was subdivided in the early 20th century, and sixteen houses were constructed between 1917 and 1951. Common house styles in the district include Georgian, Bungalow, Ranch, Colonial Revival, English Vernacular Revival, and Spanish Colonial Revival.

Colonial Revival architecture in the district includes two works by Columbus architect John C. Martin Jr.: a c.1924 two-story, brick, Georgian-type house at 1510 East Dinglewood Drive (see accompanying photo #9) and c.1928 house at 1427 West Dinglewood Drive and was built (photo #13). The first of those has a symmetric facade and a one-story half-round porch with fluted columns and an entrance with fanlight, gable returns and modillions. The second is asymmetric and has pilasters and a doorway with a broken pediment. Another Colonial Revival house is a c. 1917 Georgian house at 1108 Dinglewood Drive (photo #2); it has Doric columns on its porch and has a porte cochere.

Tudor Revival architecture includes two houses designed by John C. Martin, Jr.: the c.1927 house at 1115 West Dinglewood Drive and a c.1919 house at 1136 Dinglewood Drive. Other Tudor houses are at 1414 and 1437 West Dinglewood Drive and at 1112 Dinglewood Drive.

Frederick Roy Duncan is another Columbus architect who also worked in the district.
