= Highland Hall (Columbus, Georgia) =

Historic house in Georgia, United States

- U.S. National Register of Historic Places
- Location within Georgia Location within the United States
- Location: 1504 17th St., Columbus, Georgia
- Coordinates: 32°28′42″N 84°58′5″W
- Area: 1 acre (0.40 ha)
- Built: 1857
- Architectural style: Bungalow/Craftsman, Greek Revival
- NRHP reference No.: 80004459
- Added to NRHP: April 01, 1980

Highland Hall, located in MidTown Columbus, Georgia was built in 1857 by the Ellis family and originally sat on a ten-acre lot. It was named to the National Register of Historic Places on 1980.

== Architecture ==
The house is a Greek Revival, raised cottage that was originally two rooms deep, symmetrically flanking a large central hall. A two-story rear addition was built at about 1905, incorporating what is thought to have been the original detached kitchen. The pedimented front porch has four square-sectioned columns and fine cast-iron balustrade and ornamental trim.

== History ==
The Ellis’ sold Highland Hall in 1878 for $700. During the next decade, Highland Hall changed hands several times before being sold to Estelle Collins in 1905. Ms. Collins remained in the home until her death in 1978.
