= San Telmo (disambiguation) =

San Telmo may refer to:

== Places ==
- San Telmo, Buenos Aires, a barrio in Argentina
- San Telmo, Baja California, a city in Mexico
- Visita de San Telmo, a mission station in Baja California, Mexico
- Isla San Telmo, an island off the coast of Panama
- Sant Elm, a town in Andratx, Mallorca, Spain, known as San Telmo in Castilian
- San Telmo Island, an island of the coast of Antarctica named after the ship
- Marutea Sud, an atoll in French Polynesia, which was named "San Telmo" in 1606

== Other uses ==
- Palace of San Telmo, a historical edifice in Seville, Spain
- San Telmo Bridge, spanning the Guadalquivir River in Seville
- Club Atlético San Telmo, an association football club in the San Telmo barrio
- Spanish ship San Telmo, a Spanish Navy ship of the line launched in 1788
- Feria de San Telmo, an antique fair in the San Telmo barrio
- San Telmo Museoa, a museum of Basque culture in San Sebastián, Spain
- Santelmo, a creature of Philippine mythology

== See also ==
- Telmo (disambiguation)
- Saint Elmo (disambiguation)
