= St. Elmo (Columbus, Georgia) =

Historic house in Georgia, United States

- U.S. National Register of Historic Places
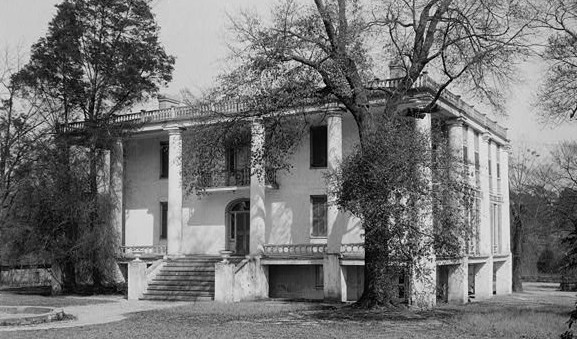

- Location within Georgia Location within the United States
- Location: 2810 St. Elmo Dr., Columbus, Georgia
- Coordinates: 32°29′21″N 84°57′58″W
- Area: 2 acres (0.81 ha)
- Built: 1828
- Architectural style: Greek Revival
- NRHP reference No.: 71000284
- Added to NRHP: April 7, 1971

St. Elmo is a historic residence located around 0.5 miles (0.80 km) northeast of Columbus, Georgia. It is listed on the National Register of Historic Places.

== Overview ==
Colonel Seaborn Jones drew all the plans for his home and called it El Dorado, land of beauty. The house was begun in 1828 and completed in 1833. The materials used to build this house, with the exception of the marble and the mahogany, were taken from the property itself. A small lake now fills the place where the clay was removed. To this El Dorado, Colonel Seaborn Jones brought his wife and children, a daughter and a son, in 1833. In 1833, Henry L. Benning, an aspiring young lawyer, wrote a friend: "Above all things (I advise if you desire ease and happiness) marry. Marry a lady of accomplishment, i.e. worth $100,000. It will be better than quibbling. I am anxious to experiment at least." In 1839, Benning, for whom Fort Benning was once named, married Colonel Seaborn Jones's daughter.

Around 1913, Lucian Lamar Knight described the home as being "in a grove of splendid oaks and elms, while the adjacent grounds contain extensive vineyards, a lake spanned by artistic bridges, a swimming pool, a tennis court, and numerous other outdoor attractions."

Many historic personages were entertained at El Dorado among them were President Millard Fillmore, President James K. Polk, Henry Clay, General Winfield Scott, and Edwin Booth. Also, here Mrs. Jones's niece, Augusta Jane Evans Wilson, finished her celebrated novel, St. Elmo. In 1878, the home was purchased by Captain and Mrs. James J. Slade who changed its name to St. Elmo in honor of the novel which it had inspired.

== Fire ==
At approximately 2:00 p.m. on October 5, 2011, a fire broke out in the basement wine cellar of St. Elmo. Apparently started by a single candle, the fire did extensive damage to the structure, but was repaired.

== See also ==
- Columbus, Georgia
- MidTown (Columbus, Georgia)
