= St. Elmo (novel) =

Novel by Augusta Jane Evans

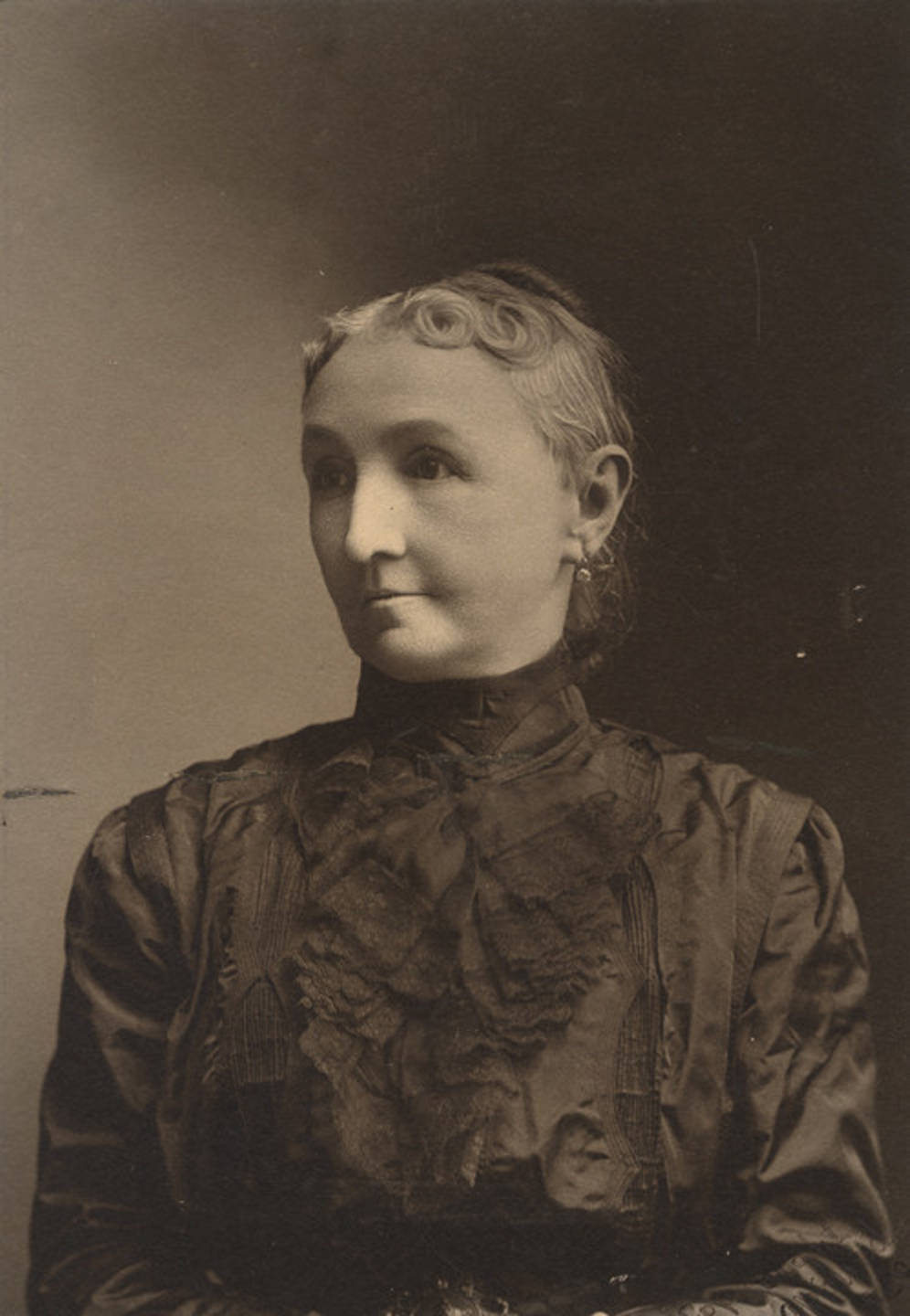
Augusta Jane Evans.

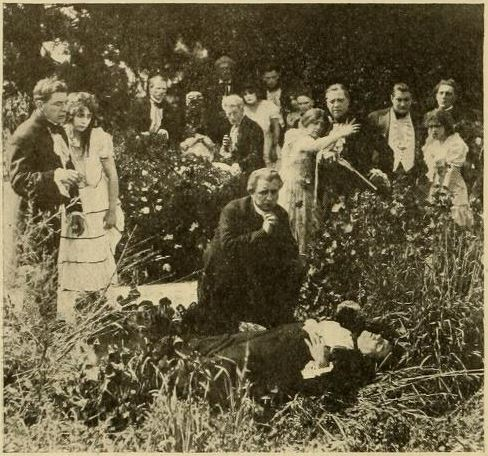
A frame from the lost film St. Elmo (1914), based on the novel by Augusta Jane Evans.

St. Elmo or Saved At Last is a novel by American author Augusta Jane Evans published in 1866. Featuring the sexual tension between the protagonist St. Elmo, a cynical man, and the heroine Edna Earl, a beautiful and devout girl, the novel was about the agency of women who could save men from apostasy. The novel became one of the most popular novels of the 19th century. The novel sold a million copies within four months of its publication.

Augusta Jane Evans (May 8, 1835 – May 9, 1909) finished her celebrated novel at El Dorado, a historical home in Columbus, Georgia. In 1878, the home was purchased by Captain and Mrs. James J. Slade who changed its name to St. Elmo in honor of the novel which it had inspired.

== Female characters ==
She wrote in the domestic, sentimental style of the Victorian Age. Critics have praised the intellectual competence of her female characters, even though her heroines eventually succumb to traditional values. The book opens with a quote from John Ruskin:

Ah! The true rule is —a true wife in her husband's house is his servant; it is in his heart that she is queen. Whatever of the best he can conceive, it is her part to be; all that is dark in him she must purge into purity; all that is failing in him she must strengthen into truth; from her, through all the world's clamor, he must win his praise; in her through all the world's warfare, he must find his peace.

She has been described as an antifeminist. In St. Elmo Wilson describes feminists as "unamiable and wretched wives" and calls them the "embittered, disappointed old maids of New England".

Recent feminist scholars have noted the complexity in categorizing her work, reading the typical marriage themes of the Victorian novel superficially, and giving more weight to the intellectual capability of her female characters. Wilson's female characters diverged from the Victorian ideal. Of St. Elmo one critic maintained, "the trouble with the heroine of St. Elmo was that she swallowed an unabridged dictionary." Wilson's works are considered to fall within the genre of "domestic fiction", and so have never been included in the literary canon because that genre is not considered worth including.

Women's lives changed in the aftermath of the Civil War, and during the War, they had assumed responsibilities outside the home. It is likely Evans had this post-bellum context in mind. She herself had worked at a Confederate hospital in Mobile, Alabama over the objections of her male relatives. Edna, the heroine in St. Elmo's was responsible and educated. Although Edna was not fully confined to the domestic sphere, Wilson's feminine ideal was not the suffragette style of feminism, which did not appeal to all classes of women in 1868. Critics, especially modern feminists, have viewed Edna's marriage as a disappointing conclusion to the character's otherwise spirited defense of women's intellect and agency.

== Editions and censorship ==
Some of the novel's controversial passages were removed from the New York Grosset and Dunlap edition (1896) of the book. These include passages on feminism and the "woman's sphere" from Chapter XXVI. Some of the content casts women of the French Revolution in a negative light, calling them "perverted" and accusing feminists of criminal acts. Twelve lines from Edna's speech were excised including "utter ignorance is infinitely preferable to erudite unwomanliness". Another forty-five lines were removed including: "I never hear that word 'equality' without a shudder". It remains a mystery why these parts of the text found in the W. Nicholson & Sons edition were left out of the New York edition.

Her books were banned by the American Library Association in 1881: "by reason of sensation or immoral qualities".

== In popular culture ==
The novel St. Elmo was frequently adapted for both the stage and screen. It inspired the naming of towns, hotels, steamboats, and a cigar brand.

St. Elmo, Texas located in Freestone County near Winkler (Navarro County) southeast of Corsicana on the southside of Richland-Chambers Resivor, is believed to be named after the book. St. Elmo School, though first unnamed and founded around 1850, took on the novel's name around 1875 when a wood-framed, one-room schoolhouse was first constructed in the rural setting.

The book's heroine Edna Earl became the namesake of Eudora Welty's heroine (Edna Earle Ponder) in The Ponder Heart published in 1954.

The novel also inspired a parody of itself called St. Twel'mo, or the Cuneiform Cyclopedist of Chattanooga (1867) by Charles Henry Webb.

A film and website on Augusta Evans Wilson entitled The Passion of Miss Augusta was produced by Alabama filmmaker Robert Clem and aired on public television in 2016, the 150th anniversary of the publication of St. Elmo.

Film adaptations

The novel has inspired the production of a number of films. These include in chronological order:

- St. Elmo (1910 Thanhouser film), a silent film
- St. Elmo (1910 Vitagraph film), a silent film
- St. Elmo (1914 film), a silent film
- St. Elmo (1923 American film), a silent film
- St. Elmo (1923 British film), a silent film
