= Dinglewood House (Columbus, Georgia) =

Historic house in Georgia, United States

- Dinglewood
- U.S. National Register of Historic Places
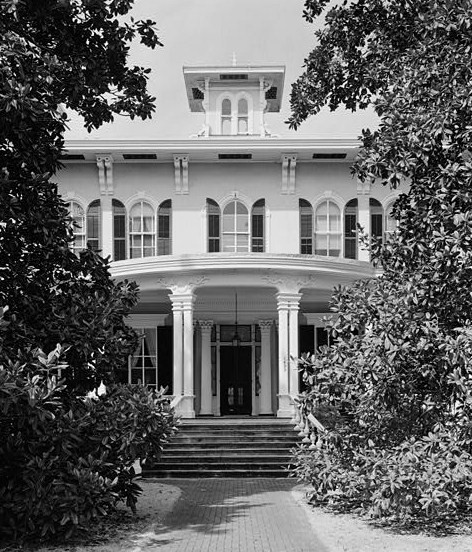
- Dinglewood in 1980

- Location within Georgia Location within the United States
- Location: 1429 Dinglewood St., Columbus, Georgia
- Coordinates: 32°28′7″N 84°58′19″W
- Built: 1858
- Architectural style: Italianate
- NRHP reference No.: 72000389
- Added to NRHP: February 1, 1972

Dinglewood House is a National Register of Historic Places listed building located at 1429 Dinglewood St., Columbus, Georgia. Joel Early Hurt built the Italianate house for his wife Frances and daughter Julia in 1858 and spared no expense. Columbus architecture firm Barringer & Morton produced the drawings.

The house reflects several architectural styles: it has French windows, Italianate overhanging eaves with decorative brackets, and a Classical Revival-style entrance with Corinthian columns.
