= St. Elmo (1910 Vitagraph film) =

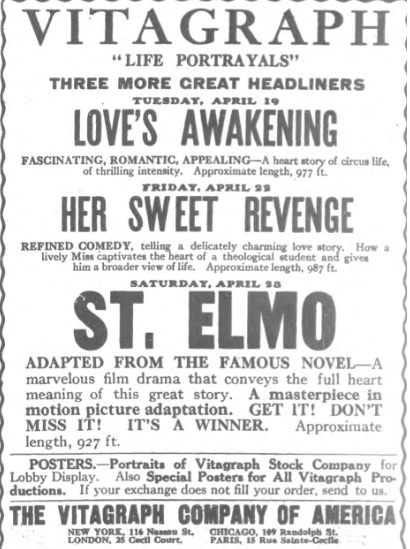
- An advertisement for the film in The New York Dramatic Mirror
- Produced by: Vitagraph
- Release date: April 23, 1910
- Country: United States
- Languages: Silent film English intertitles

St. Elmo is a 1910 American silent short drama produced by the Vitagraph.

== Cast ==
- Florence Turner as Edna

== Release and reception ==
The single reel drama, approximately 927 feet long, was released on April 23, 1910. Vitagraph announced it as "a sparkling gem in a surrounding of the most brilliant settings."

A review in the Moving Picture World called it an "adequate representation of the main theme of Augusta Evans Wilson's novel of the same name."

The Complete Index to Literary Sources in Film does not list the film in its adaptations of the novel, but it does include the more prominently known Thanhouser version of St. Elmo that was released on March 22, 1910.

== See also ==
- List of American films of 1910

== Notes ==
The 1910 edition of St. Elmo by Hurst & Company is sometimes marked as having been drawn from a movie. This is incorrect, it was designed to appeal to theater patrons and copyrighted in January 1910. Another 1910 publication by M.A Donahue includes photographs marked as having been produced by Lawrence Co. of Chicago. It does not indicate that it is from the Vitagraph production.
