= Augusta Wilson =

American writer (1835–1909)

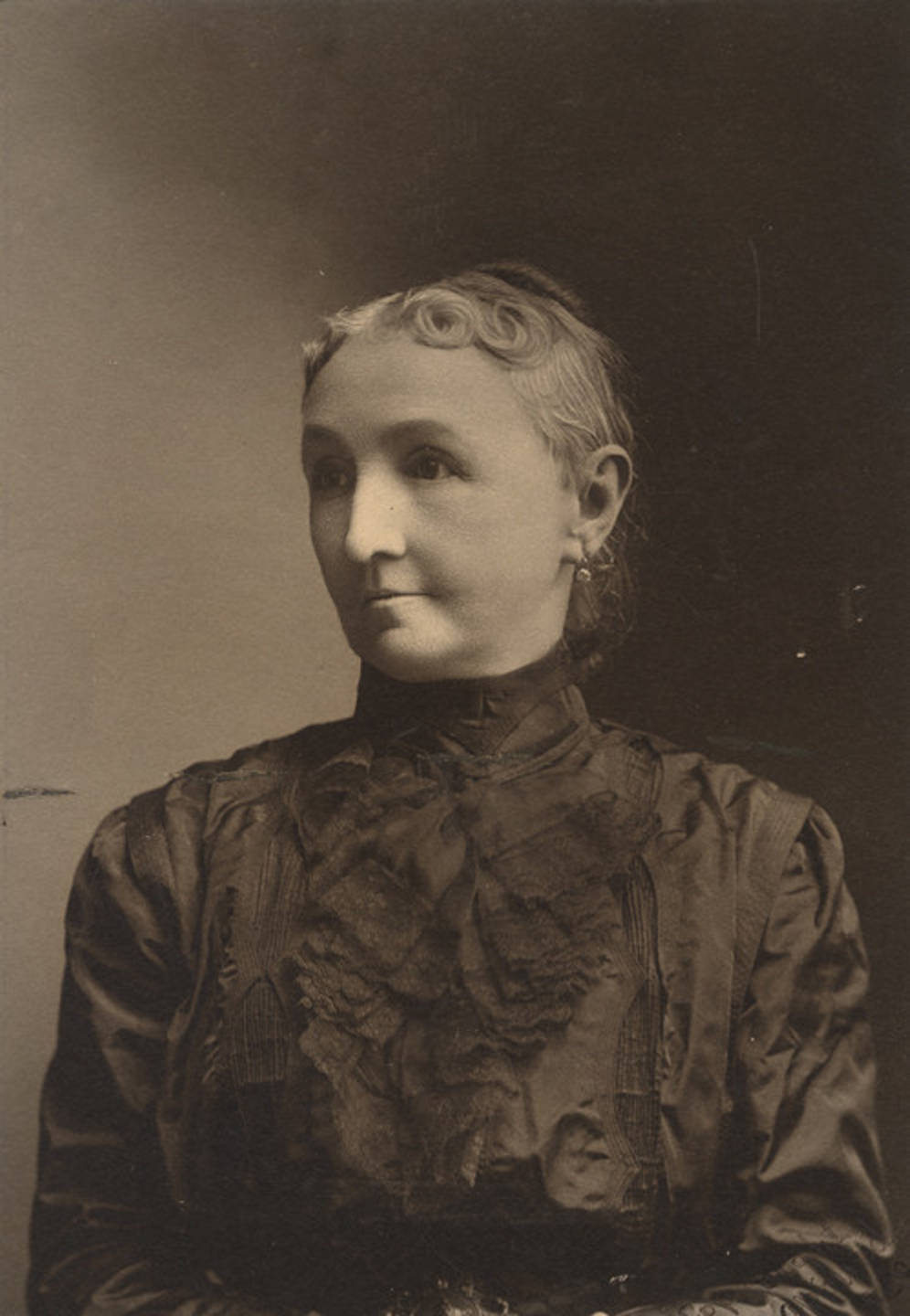
- Evans in 1890
- Born: Augusta Jane Evans; May 8, 1835; Columbus, Georgia, U.S.
- Died: May 9, 1909 (aged 74); Mobile, Alabama, U.S.
- Resting place: Magnolia Cemetery, Augusta, Georgia, U.S.
- Occupation: Author
- Spouse: Lorenzo Madison Wilson (m. 1868)
- Writing career
- Language: English
- Genre: Southern literature
- Notable work: St. Elmo

Signature
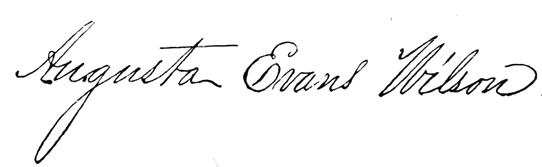

Augusta Jane Wilson (née Evans; May 8, 1835 – May 9, 1909), was an American author of Southern literature and a supporter of the Confederacy during the American Civil War. Her books were banned by the American Library Association in 1881. She was the first woman to earn US$100,000 through her writing.

Wilson was a native of Columbus, Georgia. Her first book, Inez, a Tale of the Alamo, was written when she was still young and published by Harpers. Her second book, Beulah, was issued in 1859 and became at once popular, still selling well when the American Civil War began. Cut off from the world of publishers, and intensely concerned for the cause of secession, she wrote nothing more until several years later when she published her third story, Macaria, dedicated to the soldiers of the Confederate Army. This book was burned by some protesters. After the war closed, Wilson travelled to New York with the copy of St. Elmo, which was published and met with great success. Her later works, Vashti; Infelice; and At the Mercy of Tiberius were also popular. In 1868, she married Lorenzo Madison Wilson, of Alabama, and they resided at Spring Hill.

== Early years ==
Augusta Jane Evans (Note: Willard & Livermore (1893) record her maiden name as August C. Evans.) was born on May 8, 1835, in the Wynnton suburb of Columbus, Georgia, the eldest child of the family. The area of her birth was then known as Wynnton (now MidTown). Her mother was Sarah S. Howard and her father was Matthew R. Evans. She was a descendant on her mother's side from the Howards, a prominent Georgia family. She received little formal education, but was reportedly a voracious reader at an early age.

Her father suffered bankruptcy and lost the family's Sherwood Hall property in the 1840s. He moved his family of ten from Georgia to Alabama, and Augusta was ten when they moved to San Antonio, Texas, in 1845. After the Mexican–American War ended, Evans was educated by her mother. During the Mexican war, San Antonio was the rendezvous for the United States troops sent to assist General Zachary Taylor, and Evans memories of her childhood in San Antonio during the war inspired her first novel.

In 1850, at the age of fifteen, she wrote Inez: A Tale of the Alamo, a sentimental, moralistic, and anti-Catholic love story. It told the story of one orphan's spiritual journey from religious skepticism to devout faith. She presented the manuscript to her father as a Christmas gift in 1854. It was published anonymously in 1855.

By 1849, Evans' parents moved the family to Mobile, Alabama. She wrote her next novel, Beulah, at age 18; it was published in 1859. Beulah began the theme of female education in her novels. It sold over 22,000 copies during its first year of publication and established her as Alabama's first professional author. Her family used the proceeds from her literary success to purchase Georgia Cottage on Springhill Avenue.

== Career ==
=== Civil War ===
After most of the Southern states declared their independence and seceded from the Union into the Confederate States of America, Evans became a staunch supporter of the Confederacy. Her brothers had joined the 3rd Alabama Regiment and, when she traveled to visit them in Virginia, her party was fired upon by Union soldiers from Fort Monroe. "O! I longed for a Secession flag to shake defiantly in their teeth at every fire! And my fingers fairly itched to touch off a red-hot-ball in answer to their chivalric civilities", she wrote to a friend. She became active in the subsequent Civil War as a propagandist.

Evans had been engaged to a New York journalist named James Reed Spalding, but broke off the engagement in 1860, because Spalding supported Abraham Lincoln. She nursed sick and wounded Confederate soldiers at Fort Morgan on Mobile Bay. Evans also visited Confederate soldiers at Chickamauga. She sewed sandbags for the defense of the community, wrote patriotic addresses, and set up a hospital near her residence. The hospital was dubbed Camp Beulah in honor of her novel. She also corresponded with General P.G.T. de Beauregard in 1862.

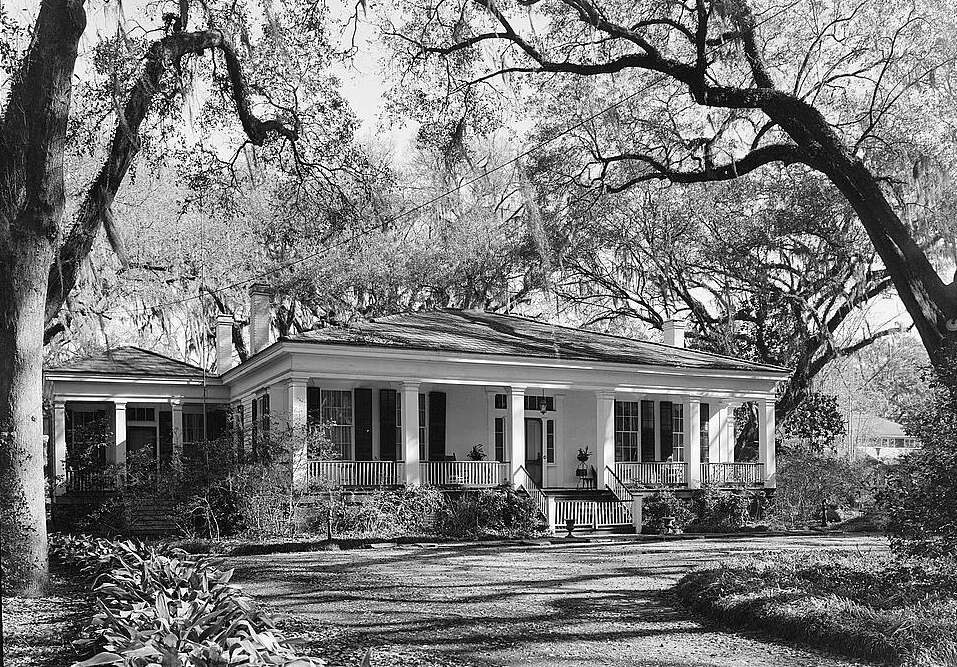
Evans wrote Macaria and St. Elmo at Georgia Cottage.

The Civil War cut Evans off from her publishers, so it was many years before she published her third novel Macaria, which she later claimed was written by candlelight while nursing wounded Confederates. The novel is about Southern women making the ultimate sacrifice for the Confederacy; it promoted the desire for an independent national culture and reflected Southern values of the time. She sent a copy of this book with a letter to the publishers through the blockade. It was carried safely to Havana, and then to New York City. The book had already been published by a bookseller in Richmond, Virginia, and printed in South Carolina. It was entered according to the Confederate States of America, and dedicated to the soldiers of the Confederate army. Some portions of the manuscript were scribbled in pencil while sitting up with the sick soldiers in "Camp Beulah" near Mobile. A Federal officer in Kentucky seized and burned every copy of the Confederate edition of Macaria which he could find. A Northern publisher reportedly obtained a copy and published it, but swore he would pay no royalties to so "arch a rebel." J. B. Lippincott & J.C. Derby expostulated with him, and finally secured a contract by which the author would receive royalties. General George Henry Thomas, commander of the Union Army in Tennessee, confiscated copies and had the books burned.

=== Post-war years ===
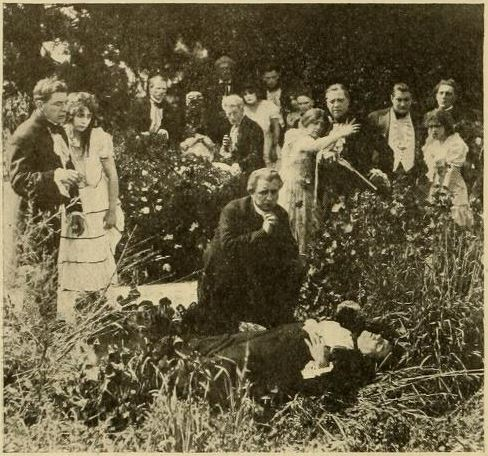
A frame from the lost film St. Elmo (1914), based on the novel by Augusta Evans

After the Civil War ended, Evans went to New York to take the manuscript of her most ambitious effort, St. Elmo (1866). She finished the celebrated novel at the home of her aunt, Mary Howard Jones (wife of Colonel Seaborn Jones), "El Dorado". In St. Elmo the general setting, if not the specific details, seems to be the Jones's El Dorado. In 1878, the home was purchased by Captain and Mrs. James J. Slade who changed its name to St. Elmo in honor of the novel which it had inspired. St. Elmo sold a million copies within four months. It featured sexual tension between the protagonist St. Elmo, who was cynical, and the heroine Edna Earl, who was beautiful and devout. It became one of the most popular novels of the 19th century. Towns, hotels, steamboats and plantations were named after it, and the author was recompensed with large financial returns. The "high flown" language in which it was written, and the rare literary attainments of the little barefoot heroine drew forth severe criticism, and some one even ventured on a parody, "St. Twelvemo"; but all this could not affect the popularity of the book. People were eager for her next work, and after Vashti appeared, could not rest satisfied until they heard that another would soon be given them. Soon after Vashti was published, in 1868, she married Confederate veteran Colonel Lorenzo Madison Wilson, becoming Augusta Evans Wilson. He was 27 years her senior. Colonel Wilson acquired wealth in banking, railroads, and wholesale groceries. Not far from her home at Georgia Cottage, they settled in a columned house called Ashland in Mobile. The couple attended St. Francis Street Methodist Church. Wilson became the first lady of Mobile society, supplanting Madame Le Vert who had fallen into social disfavor for having welcomed the Federal occupation of Mobile too warmly. Because of her delicate health, Lorenzo objected seriously to her writing, and at his request, she discontinued it and devoted herself to decorating her home and grounds. Colonel Wilson died in 1892.

Time and time again flattering offers came for her to contribute to magazines and papers, but she refused. Not even a proposition to let her name her own price for a serial could tempt her. One publisher offered US$25,000 if she would only allow them to publish her books in cheap "paperback" form, not to interfere with her library-bound editions, but this permission was never granted. She received a check for US$15,000 for Vashti before it ever went to press. Ten years elapsed between Infelice and At the Mercy of Tiberius.

== Critical response ==
Wilson's style was severely criticized as "pedantic." She wrote in the domestic, sentimental style of the Victorian Age. Critics have praised the intellectual competence of her female characters, but as her heroes eventually succumb to traditional values, Wilson has been described as an antifeminist. Of St. Elmo one critic maintained, "the trouble with the heroine of St. Elmo was that she swallowed an unabridged dictionary." Wilson was the first American woman author to earn over $100,000. This would be a record unsurpassed until Edith Wharton.

Macaria, or Altars of Sacrifice, published in 1864, was popular with Southerners and Northerners alike. Melissa Homestead writes that the transportation of the novel to New York was deliberate, done in installments and nearly simultaneous with the novel's preparation for publication in the South. Thus, while previous critics, scholars and biographers have all treated Macaria’s appearance in the North as unauthorized, the truth is much more meaningful. Some scholars say that by dispensing with the romantic notion that the novel appeared in a "bootleg" edition, Homestead debunks the hard and fast distinction between Northern and Southern readerships as an invention of historians and critics rather than an accurate reflection of reading practices of the period. However, a great number of discrepancies exist between the version published in the North and the version published in the South, which remove huge portions of the text which romanticize the Southern heroes that are portrayed.

Her novel St. Elmo was her most famous and it was frequently adapted for both the stage and screen and perhaps the most controversial. It was about the independence of women: although women did not need men, and could achieve independence, they also could save men from their tendency to apostasy. The novel inspired the naming of towns, hotels, steamboats, and a cigar brand. The book's heroine, Edna Earl, became the namesake of Eudora Welty's heroine (Edna Earle Ponder) in The Ponder Heart published in 1954. The novel also inspired a parody of itself called St. Twel'mo, or the Cuneiform Cyclopedist of Chattanooga (1867) by Charles Henry Webb. One reviewer wrote:

The beauty and purity of Christian truth she coins from the crucible in which her mystic alchemy is cast. She never wavers in the sacred faith of a pure and true religion.

Her books were banned by the American Library Association in 1881: "by reason of sensation or immoral qualities".

== Death and legacy ==
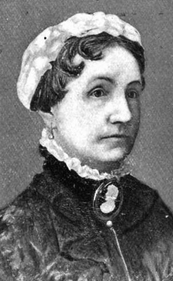
Mrs. Augusta Evans Wilson (1894)

Wilson had become wealthy through her marriage and her literary earnings and retired from writing during her final years. She died of a heart attack in Mobile on May 9, 1909, and is buried in Mobile's Magnolia Cemetery. Her beloved Ashland burned to the ground in 1926. However, Georgia Cottage is still standing with a historical marker on Springhill Avenue designating it as her home.

Given her support for the Confederate States of America from the perspective of a Southern patriot, and her literary activities during the American Civil War, she can be deemed as having contributed decisively to the literary and cultural development of the Confederacy in particular, and of the South in general. She was inducted into the Alabama Women's Hall of Fame in 1977 and was one of twelve inaugural inductees to the Alabama Writers Hall of Fame on June 8, 2015.

A film and website on Wilson entitled The Passion of Miss Augusta was produced by Alabama filmmaker Robert Clem in 2016, the 150th anniversary of the publication of St. Elmo. The film combines documentary interviews and dramatized scenes from St. Elmo as a silent film and a 1950s film showing how its story might have been told at a time when Eudora Welty, William Faulkner and Tennessee Williams were the face of Southern fiction. Interviews from the film as well as photographs and other exhibits have been collected in an online 'museum' on Wilson and her career. Brenda Ayres wrote the biography, The Life and Works of Augusta Jane Evans Wilson, 1835–1909 (2016).

== Selected works ==
- Inez (1850)
- Beulah (1859)
- Macaria (1863)
- St. Elmo (1866)
- Vashti (1869)
- Infelice (1875)
- At the Mercy of Tiberius (1887)
- A Speckled Bird (1902)
- Devota (1907)

== See also ==
- Alabama literature
