= Isaiah Hugley =

American politician (born 1958)

Mayor-elect of Columbus, Georgia
- Assuming office January 2027
- Succeeding: Skip Henderson

City Manager of Columbus, Georgia
- In office 2005 – May 27, 2025
- Preceded by: Carmen J. Cavezza
- Succeeded by: Tyson Begley

Personal details
- Born: May 18, 1958 (age 68) Crawford, Russell County, Alabama
- Party: Democratic
- Spouse: Carolyn Hugley (m. 1981)
- Education: Talladega College (BA); Mississippi State University (MS)
- Website: Campaign website

Isaiah Hugley (born May 18, 1958) is an American politician and the mayor-elect of Columbus, Georgia. Upon taking office in January 2027, he will become the first Black elected mayor in the city's history.

Born in Crawford, Russell County, Alabama, he was raised by his mother Rozell Hugley Wilborn, a domestic worker and church leader, as the second of four children. He was raised in the Frederick Douglass public housing complex in Phenix City, then the Farley Homes and Baker Village public housing complexes in Columbus. Graduating from William Henry Spencer High School in 1975, Hugley received his Bachelor of Arts degree in History/Pre-Law from Talladega College (1979) as well as a Master of Science in Public Policy and public administration from Mississippi State University (1980) prior to working for the Mississippi Council on Aging and the Mississippi Department of Transportation. He returned to the Columbus area by 1984 to serve as assistant director of the Metra transit system. He was elevated to Director of Metra from 1988 to 1997.

He served as Deputy City Manager from 1998 to 2005 and City Manager of Columbus from 2005, succeeding Carmen J. Cavezza, on the recommendation of then-mayor Robert Poydasheff. At the time of his termination in 2025 by the Columbus City Council, he was the longest-serving City Manager in the city's history, as well as the first Black City Manager.

He announced his campaign for Mayor on October 13, 2025. After leading the first round on May 19, 2026, he defeated city councilmember Joanne Cogle in the runoff on June 16. He will also be the first Black person to serve in the role of mayor since the tenure of A.J. McClung, who served as acting mayor from February to April 1973.

== Personal life ==
In 1981, he married Carolyn Fleming with whom he had been a student at Mississippi State, currently an insurance agent, state representative and House Minority Leader in the Georgia House of Representatives. They have two children, Kimberly and Isaiah Jr., and two grandchildren. His sister, Patricia Hugley-Green, currently serves as chair of the Muscogee County School District.

== Electoral history ==
Columbus, Georgia mayoral general election, 2026
Party	Candidate	Votes	%
Nonpartisan	Isaiah Hugley	16,325	44.69
Nonpartisan	Joanne Cogle	9,189	25.16
Nonpartisan	Chris Breault	4,721	12.92
Nonpartisan	Jaketra Bryant	3,464	9.48
Nonpartisan	Mark LaJoye	1,861	5.09
Nonpartisan	Steve Kelly	969	2.65
Total votes		36,529	100.00

Columbus, Georgia mayoral general runoff election, 2026
Party	Candidate	Votes	%
Nonpartisan	Isaiah Hugley	16,309	51.58
Nonpartisan	Joanne Cogle	15,312	48.42
Total votes		31,621	100.00

== See also ==
- List of mayors of Columbus, Georgia
