= 2018 Columbus, Georgia mayoral election =

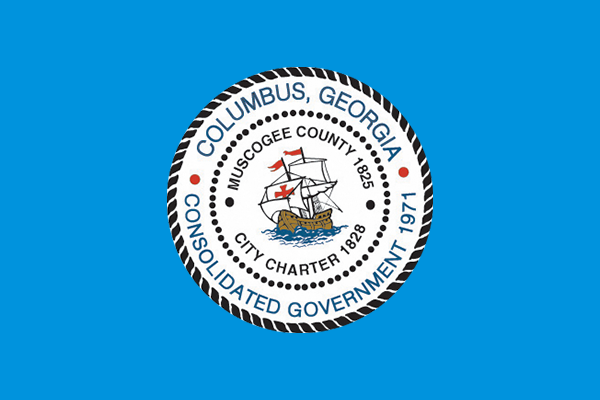
- May 22, 2018

Candidate	Skip Henderson	Zeph Baker
Party	Nonpartisan	Nonpartisan
Popular vote	13,495	7,662
Percentage	56.26%	31.94%
Mayor before election
Teresa Tomlinson
Nonpartisan
Elected mayor
Skip Henderson
Nonpartisan

The 2018 Columbus, Georgia mayoral election took place on May 22, 2018. Incumbent Mayor Teresa Tomlinson was term-limited and unable to seek a third consecutive term. City Councilman Skip Henderson won the election with 56 percent of the vote, avoiding the need for a runoff election.

== Primary election ==
=== Candidates ===
- Skip Henderson, City Councilman
- Zeph Baker, perennial candidate
- Danny Arcencibia, car dealership manager
- Beth Harris, former Muscogee County Board of Education member
- Charlie Roberts, operations analyst
- Winfred Shipman, U.S. Army veteran

=== Results ===
Primary election results
Party	Candidate	Votes	%
Nonpartisan	Skip Henderson	13,495	56.26%
Nonpartisan	Zeph Baker	7,662	31.94%
Nonpartisan	Danny Arcencibia	1,145	4.77%
Nonpartisan	Beth Harris	1,007	4.20%
Nonpartisan	Charlie Roberts	335	1.40%
Nonpartisan	Winfred Shipman	278	1.16%
Write-in		64	0.27%
Total votes		23,986	100.00%
