= Thomas Whitley =

American college president (1916–2011)

- Born: Thomas Youngie Whitley; January 4, 1916; Mystic, Georgia, US
- Died: September 11, 2011 (aged 95); Social Circle, Georgia, US
- Education: University of Georgia, B.A. University of Texas, Ed.D.
- Occupations: Academic administrator and president
- Employer: Columbus State University
- Known for: Founding president of Columbus College

Thomas Youngie Whitley Sr. (January 4, 1916 – September 11, 2011) was an American academic administrator who served as the first president of Columbus State University from 1958 to 1979. He also oversaw the consolidation of the Columbus and Muscogee County, Georgia governments.

== Early life ==
Whitley was a native of south Georgia. He was born in Mystic, Georgia on January 4, 1916. His parents were Dora (née Vickers) and Thomas L. Whitley. He was reared by his grandmother Jane McMillan Whitley and four maid aunts after his mother died when he was six weeks old.

Whitley graduated from Ocilla High School in Ocilla, Georgia. He graduated from the University of Georgia with a Bachelor's degree in education. He also received an Ed.D degree in junior college administration from the University of Texas.

== Career ==
Whitley was a teacher and principal in Osierfield, Georgia from 1935 to 1936, and in Tate, Georgia from 1938 to 1940. He was the director of youth personnel for the National Youth Administration from 1941 to 1942. During World War II, he served in the United States Air Force from 1942 to 1945, followed by working as a counselor for the United States Veterans Administration from 1945 to 1947.

Whitley was the dean of students at South Georgia State College from 1947 to 1958. In 1958, he became the assistant to the chancellor of University System of Georgia, helping to create six junior colleges. In this capacity, he asked to help gain support for a new junior college in Columbus, Georgia. In May 1958, Whitley became the founding president of Columbus College, now called Columbus State University. He oversaw the college's move to a permanent campus in 1963. He pushed for its upgrade from a junior college to a four-year institution in 1965. He retired on June 30, 1979.

He was president of the Georgia Association of Junior Colleges and served on the board of the Columbus College Foundation, and the Southern Association of Junior College Presidents.

== Honors ==
Whitley was an honorary of the Chi Theta chapter of Alpha Phi Omega. He was selected as the Citizen of the Year in 1979 by the Columbus Life Underwriters Assocations. That same year, he received the James W. Woodruff Jr. Memorial Award from the Columbus Chamber of Commerce for distinguished citizenship. In 1998, he received an honorary Doctor of Human Letters from Columbus State University.

The Columbus State University Alumni Association has presented its annual Thomas Y. Whitley Distinguished Alumnus Award since 1980. The Thomas Y. Whitley Clock Tower at Columbus State University was dedicated in his honor in 1991. The university has the Thomas Y. Whitley Scholarship Fund.

== Personal life ==
Whitley was married to Mary Jo Dally in 1941. They had a daughter and three sons.

In 1981, Whitley was the chairman of the Charter Commission of Columbus-Muscogee County, overseeing the merger of the city and county governments. He served on the board of the Columbus Chamber of Commerce, the Citizens and Military Council, First Federal Savings and Loan, the Medical Center, and the Symphony Endowment Fund. He was president of the Kiwanis club of Columbus and was a member of the Chattahoochee Valley Beekeepers Association, the Candun Club, the Men's Garden Club, First Presbyterian Church, and Ray Memorial Presbyterian Church in Monroe, Georgia.

Whitley and his wife moved to Social Circle, Georgia in 1986. He died on September 11, 2001, in Social Circle at the age of 85 from complications related to Alzheimer's disease. He was buried in the Social Circle City Cemetery.
