= Shaw High School (Georgia) =

William Henry Shaw High School
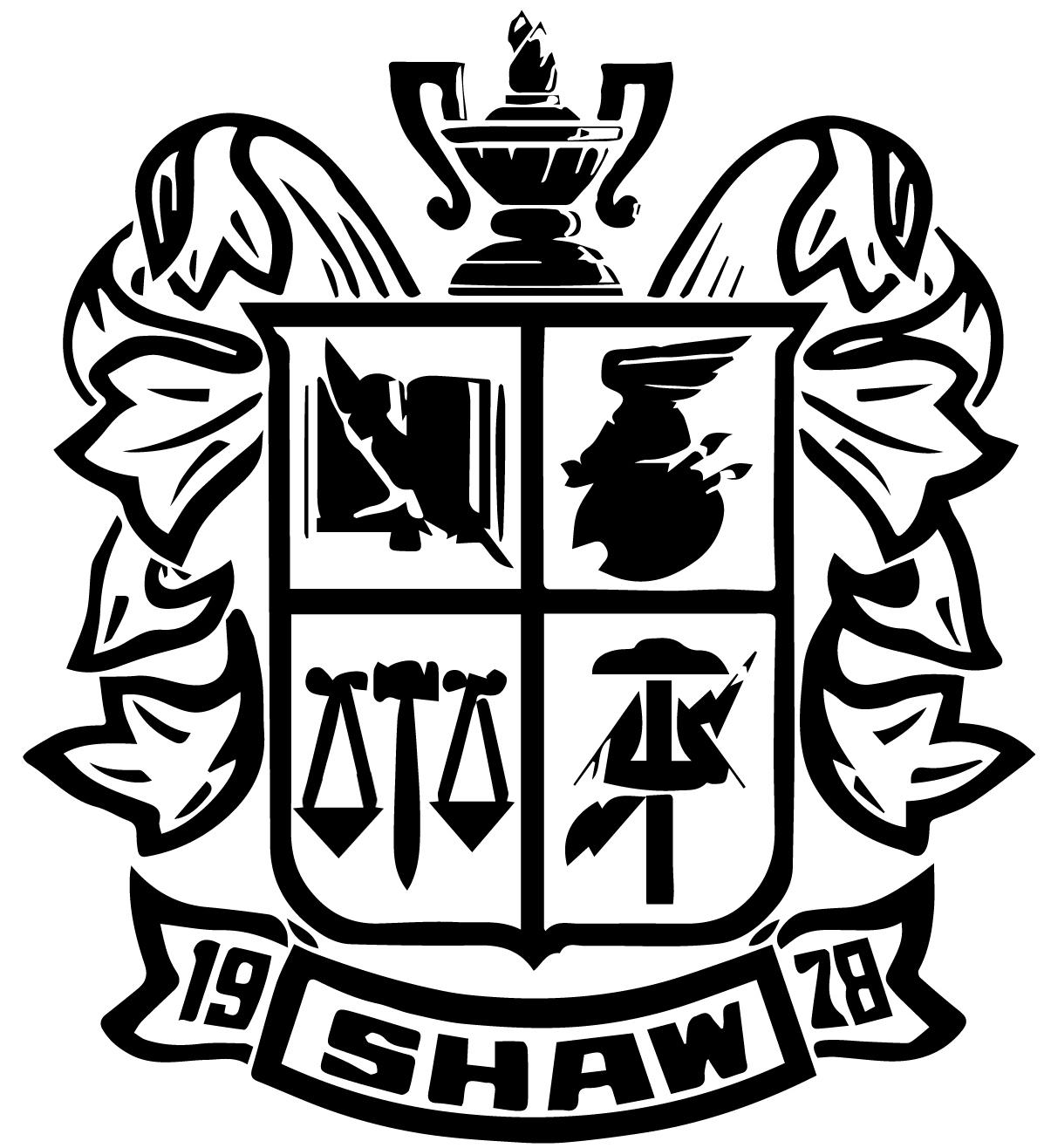

Location
- 7579 Raider Way; Columbus, Georgia 31909; United States; 32.55844°N 84.90955°W

Information
- Type: Public
- Established: 1978
- Principal: S Hendrick
- Staff: 79.70 (FTE)
- Enrollment: 1,162 (2024–2025)
- Colors: Black and silver
- Mascot: Raider
- Ratio: 14.58
- Partners in Education: TSYS, Mediacom, WTVM, Freeman & Associates, and University of Phoenix
- Website: Shaw High School

William Henry Shaw High School is located in Columbus, Georgia, United States. It opened in 1978 at its present location in the Northern Columbus area. Students began attending classes in September of the same year.

The school is named in honor of former Muscogee County School District Superintendent William Henry Shaw. Its original proposed name was Schomburg North High School.

Although Shaw is one of the newer high schools in Columbus, it has achieved academic and athletic success in its short history. Academically, Shaw High School was named a "School of Excellence" by the Georgia Department of Education in 1984 and 2005. In 2005, Shaw High School was also a recipient of the State of Georgia Platinum Award: Greatest Gain in Students Meeting and Exceeding Standards. In 2006, the Georgia DOE named Shaw a "Distinguished School" for academic achievement, one of two Muscogee County School District Schools to achieve this honor. In 2009, Georgia State Superintendent of Schools Kathy Cox named Shaw High School as an AP Access and Support School: schools with 30% of AP test takers who are African-American or Hispanic and at least 30% of all AP exam takers scoring 3 or higher. Shaw High School was one of only two Muscogee County School District Schools to receive AP Honors in 2009.

Shaw High School has bolstered five state titles in athletics: girls' track in 1977, 1999, and 2000; football in 2000; and baseball in 2001. Shaw High School's Raider Football program was the second Columbus football team to win a state championship, the first football team in Columbus to win it outright, and the first football team in Columbus to do so undefeated (15-0).

== Location ==
The school is located in the Northern Columbus area. It is accessible from JR Allen Parkway and is located just off of Schomburg Road, in front of Kinnett Stadium.

== Activities ==
Students can spend their time out of class in the following extracurricular activities.

=== Athletics ===
Shaw High School is currently rated AAAA by student population. The athletic teams are known as the Raiders.

- Boys'/girls' cross country: 2008 ranked first in the region and tenth in the state (boys')
- Boys'/girls' track: 1997, 1999-2000 State Champions (girls'), 2018-2019 State Champions (boys’)
- Boys'/girls' basketball: 2007, 2008 State Sweet Sixteen (boys'); 2006 Quarterfinals/State Elite 8 (boys')
- Boys'/girls' tennis: 2021 State Sweet Sixteen (girls’)
- Boys'/girls' golf
- Boys'/girls' soccer
- Baseball: 2001 AAAA State Champions; 2002 2-AAAA Region Champs and AAAA State Runners-up
- Football: 2000 AAAA State Champions; 2002, 2005 semi-finalist; 2000–2003 2-AAAA Region Champs, 1999, 2005 2-AAA Region Champs
- Swim team
- Softball: 2019 State Sweet Sixteen
- Cheerleading
- Wrestling
- Volleyball: 2008 Elite Eight; 2006 Best Record and Best Finish

=== Clubs and organizations ===
- Art Club
- Best Buddies
- Beta Club
- Booster Clubs
- Chattahoochee Valley Foreign Language Society
- Chess Club
- Concert Band
- Drama Club
- DECA
- FBLA
- FCA
- FCCLA
- French Club
- French Honor Society
- Green Club
- GSA (Gay-Straight Alliance)
- Guitar Ensemble
- The Hook
- JROTC
- Leadership Council
- Marching Band
- Mass Communications Academy (Shaw's mass media magnet program)
- Model United Nations;
- Mu Alpha Theta
- National Honor Society
- National Spanish Honor Society
- National Technical Honor Society
- Newspaper (The Silver Star News Magazine)
- Percussion Ensemble
- Quill & Scroll Society
- RADD
- Raider News Network (television broadcast)
- Raider Reader Book Club
- Science Club
- Shipwrecked
- Show Choir
- SkillsUSA
- Spanish Club
- Teen Advisors
- Thespian Society
- Tri-M Music Honor Society
- Yearbook (The Shaw Sharaide)
- Young Historians

== Notable alumni ==
- Troy Bergeron ('02), former professional football player for the Atlanta Falcons and Dallas Cowboys
- Marina Savashynskaya Dunbar ('10), contemporary painter.
- Chasity Hardman-Smith ('03), second African-American Miss Georgia ('08); 1st Runner-Up in Miss America 2009
- Edwin Jackson ('01), professional baseball player, played for record fourteen different major league teams.
- Steven Register ('01), former professional baseball player who last played for the Toronto Blue Jays
- Philip Wheeler ('03), football player for the Arizona Cardinals
