= Henry Harden =

Henry Harden may refer to:

- Henry Eric Harden (1912–1945), English recipient of the Victoria Cross
- Henry Scott Harden (1835–1879), member of the Queensland Legislative Council
- J. Henry Harden (1912–1982), agricultural county agent and Georgia state legislator
