= Kathy Love =

Kathy Love may refer to:

- Kathy Love (academic administrator)
- Kathy Love (politician)
