= 2026 Columbus, Georgia elections =

A general election will be held on May 19, 2026 in Columbus-Muscogee County, Georgia for mayor, Columbus City Council for odd-numbered districts, and Muscogee County School Board for even-numbered districts. The election is being held alongside other elections and primaries.

== Mayor ==
Incumbent Mayor Skip Henderson is term-limited and unable to seek a third consecutive term.

=== Candidates ===
- Isaiah Hugley, former city manager (2005-2025)
- Joanne Cogle, city councilmember (2023-present)
- Chris Breault, attorney
- Steve Kelly, Army veteran
- Jaketra Bryant, licensed counselor
- Mark LaJoye, retired Russell County, Alabama sheriff's deputy and perennial candidate for Muscogee County sheriff

== City Council ==
=== District 1 ===
Incumbent Byron Hickey, who was appointed to replace Jerry "Pops" Barnes, is not running for a full term.

- Simi Barnes, licensed counselor
- Karen Gaskins, former Columbus Police Department sergeant

=== District 3 ===
Incumbent Bruce Huff is retiring.

- Sherrie Aaron
- Jake Golden IV, teacher
- Zack Lee, filmmaker

=== District 5 ===
- Charmaine Crabb (incumbent), real estate agent
- Robert Wadkins Jr, attorney

=== District 7 ===
Incumbent Joanne Cogle is retiring to run for mayor.

- Laketha Ashe
- Chiara Richardson
- Rebecca "Becca" Zajac, nonprofit manager

=== At-Large District 9 ===
Incumbent John Anker, who was appointed to replace Judy Thomas, is running for a full term.

- John Anker (incumbent)
- Cathy Cooke, dentist
- Rocky Marsh, Army veteran and federal budget analyst
- John Van Doorn

== School Board ==
=== District 2 ===
- Nickie Tillery (incumbent)

=== District 4 ===
- Naomi Buckner (incumbent)

=== District 6 ===
- Mark Cantrell (incumbent)
- Bob Roth

=== District 8 ===
- Margot Schley (incumbent)
- Joshua Smith

=== At-Large Member ===
- Kia Chambers (incumbent)
- Sadiyah Abdullah
- Kevin Miller
