= Marina Savashynskaya Dunbar =

American modern/abstract artist

Marina Dunbar
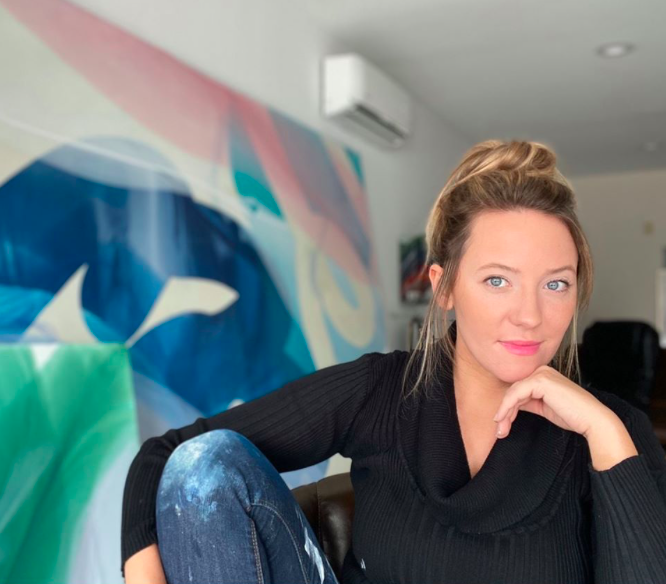
- Dunbar in 2020
- Born: Minsk, Belarus
- Education: Columbus State University
- Style: Abstract expressionism
- Patrons: Hilton Hotels, Ritz Carlton, Chevron Corporation, Crystal Cruises, Silversea Cruises, TUI Cruises, Rosewood Hotels, South Carolina Ports Authority, Sloan Kettering
- Website: marinadunbar.com

Marina Savashynskaya Dunbar is a Belarusian artist and entrepreneur. She is known for her modern, abstract paintings. Her artwork has been featured in museums and galleries throughout the United States as well as national and international private and public collections. She studied business and fine art in college and she is currently based in Charleston, South Carolina.

== Career ==
Marina Savashynskaya Dunbar grew up in Minsk, Belarus up to the age of nine years old. In 2001, she immigrated to Columbus, Georgia with her mother, where she lived and worked for 17 years. She graduated from Columbus State University in 2016 with a Bachelor of Fine Arts and worked under artists Bo Bartlett and Betsy Eby as a studio assistant. Upon graduating, she moved to Charleston, South Carolina to expand her artistic career.

== Work ==
Dunbar considers her paintings to be nature-based abstractions, citing movement, harmony and material improvisation as sources of inspiration. Her paintings are multi-layered surfaces, consisting of thin veils of color as well as bold marks and sculptural application of paint. The subject matter of her work is varied, employing nuanced depictions of nature, organic forms and gestural mark-making. Her process is physical, as she manipulates her material across the surface of the canvas using heat, wind, and gravity. Dunbar works in mixed media, experimental sculpture and video.

== Exhibitions and engagements ==
Dunbar has exhibited her work regularly since 2015 in solo and group exhibitions. Her recent solo exhibitions took place in New Orleans, Atlanta and Charleston with Octavia Art Gallery, Spalding Nix Fine Art Gallery and the Gibbes Museum of Art. Her group exhibitions include shows in Dubai, London, Texas, North Carolina, South Carolina, Georgia, Missouri, Oklahoma, Connecticut, Louisiana, Minnesota, and New York.

Dunbar has been invited to speak regularly throughout the Southeast about her work, artistic process, and career.
