= Bobby Peters =

American politician (born 1949)

Judge Chattahoochee Superior Court.
- Incumbent
- Assumed office 2004

Mayor of Columbus, Georgia
- In office 1995–2002
- Preceded by: Frank K. Martin
- Succeeded by: Robert Poydasheff

Personal details
- Born: Bobby G. Peters Columbus, Georgia, U.S.
- Education: Woodrow Wilson College of Law (JD); Columbus University (M.A.Ed.), BCJ)

Bobby G. Peters is an American judge, attorney, and politician. He is a superior court judge in Georgia and a former mayor of Columbus, Georgia.

== Early life and education ==
Peters is from Columbus, Georgia. He graduated from Hardaway High School in 1967, in Columbus. He earned a Bachelor of Science in criminal justice, and a master's degree in education at Columbus State University. He attendedWoodrow Wilson College of Law, graduating with a J.D. degree in 1979.

== Career ==
Peters worked for the Muscogee County Sheriff's Office as a detective. He was also a professor of criminal justice at Southern Union State Community College. He was also the director of the Regional Police Academy.

Peters was admitted to the George Bar in 1979 and started his law practice. In 1982, he was elected to the Columbus City Council, serving as a city councilor for twelve years. Peters was first elected mayor in 1994 and served for two consecutive terms. He served as mayor for eight years, from 1995 to 2002, when Robert Poydasheff was elected. Later, he was the Public Safety Director for the City of Columbus.

Peters was elected to the Chattahoochee Superior Court in 2004. He was re-reelected in 2012 and 2016. In November 2011, he received a private reprimand from the Judicial Qualifications Commission for failing to disclose a potential conflict of interest in 2005.

== Honors ==
In 2002, Peters was one of ten U.S. representatives to a governmental exchange program with Australia. He was named Ambassador of Goodwill by the Western Hemisphere Institute for Security Cooperation.

General Paul Eaton, commander of Fort Benning, presented Peters with the Order of Saint Maurice in 2002.

== Personal life ==
Peters is a member of Calvary Baptist Church of Columbus. He has two daughters.

Preceded by Frank Martin	Mayor of Columbus, Georgia; 1995-2002	Succeeded by Robert Poydasheff
