= Marcus Smith II =

American football player (born 1992)

No. 90, 97, 48
- Position: Linebacker

Personal information
- Born: March 31, 1992 (age 34); Columbus, Georgia, U.S.
- Listed height: 6 ft 3 in (1.91 m)
- Listed weight: 258 lb (117 kg)

Career information
- High school: Hardaway (Columbus, Georgia)
- College: Louisville (2010–2013)
- NFL draft: 2014: 1st round, 26th overall pick

Career history
- Philadelphia Eagles (2014–2016); Seattle Seahawks (2017); Washington Redskins (2018)

Awards and highlights
- AAC Defensive Player of the Year (2013); Third-team All-American (2013); First-team All-AAC (2013)

Career NFL statistics
- Total tackles: 38
- Sacks: 6.5
- Forced fumbles: 2
- Stats at Pro Football Reference

Marcus Smith II (born March 31, 1992) is an American former professional football player who was a linebacker in the National Football League (NFL). He was selected by the Philadelphia Eagles in the first round of the 2014 NFL draft, and played college football for the Louisville Cardinals.

== Early life ==
Smith attended Hardaway High School in Columbus, Georgia. He played quarterback for Hardaway, passing for more than 1,800 yards and 14 touchdowns, while adding 227 yards rushing and four touchdowns. As a senior, he was selected to the 2009 AAAA All-Region Second-team.

He was considered a three-star recruit by Rivals.com.

== College career ==
Smith attended the University of Louisville from 2010 to 2013.

As a senior in 2013, he recorded 42 tackles, including 18.5 for loss, and 14.5 sacks, which was second nationally. He was named a third-team All-American by the Associated Press. He was also a first-team All-American Athletic Conference (AAC) and was named the conference's Defensive Player of the Year.

== Professional career ==
Pre-draft measurables
Height	Weight	Arm length	Hand span	40-yard dash	20-yard shuttle	Three-cone drill	Vertical jump	Broad jump	Bench press
6 ft 3 3/8 in (1.91 m)	251 lb (114 kg)	34 in (0.86 m)	10 in (0.25 m)	4.68 s	4.47 s	7.48 s	35 in (0.89 m)	10 ft 1 in (3.07 m)	23 reps
All values from NFL Combine

=== Philadelphia Eagles ===
Smith was selected 26th overall, by the Philadelphia Eagles in the first round of the 2014 NFL draft.

In the 2014 season, Smith was on the field for eight of the team's 16 games. On May 1, 2017, the Eagles declined to exercise the fifth-year option on Smith's contract.

On July 26, 2017, Smith was waived by the Eagles.

=== Seattle Seahawks ===
On July 28, 2017, Smith signed with the Seattle Seahawks.

On October 1, 2017, after Cliff Avril suffered a neck injury against the Indianapolis Colts, Smith was forced into the starting defensive line rotation early in the game. He responded with the finest game of his career, recording 1.5 sacks and 1 forced fumble on Colts quarterback Jacoby Brissett.

On March 22, 2018, Smith re-signed with the Seahawks. He was released on August 17, 2018.

=== Washington Redskins ===
On December 4, 2018, Smith signed with the Washington Redskins, but was waived on December 15, 2018. He was re-signed on December 27, 2018.

Smith was waived on August 31, 2019, for final roster cuts before the start of the 2019 season.

== Literature ==
On December 2, 2020, Smith released a children's book titled Bathtime with Rai.
