= Philip Wheeler =

American football player (born 1984)

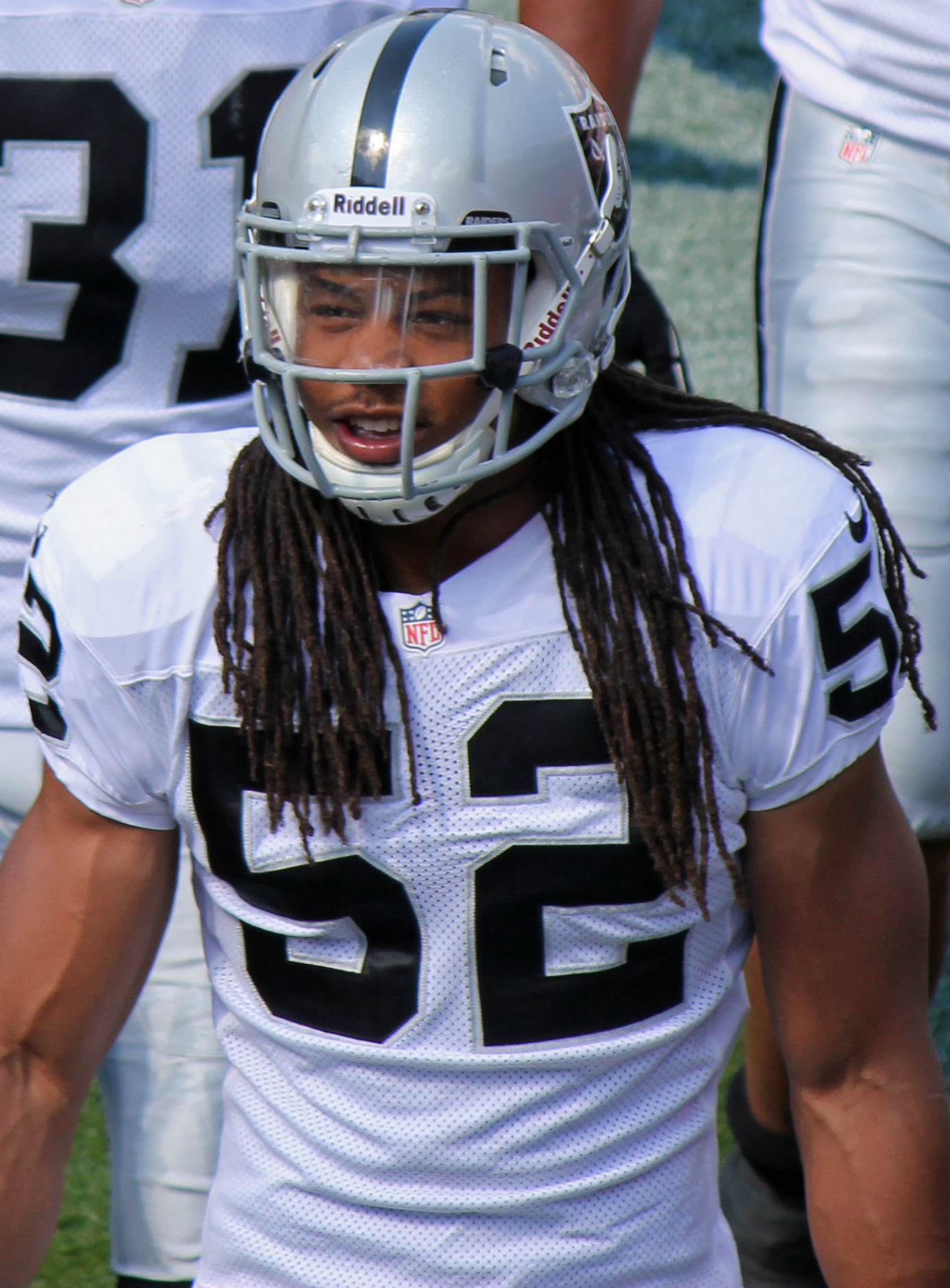
- Wheeler with the Oakland Raiders in 2012

No. 50, 52, 51, 41
- Position: Linebacker

Personal information
- Born: December 12, 1984 (age 41); Columbus, Georgia, U.S.
- Listed height: 6 ft 2 in (1.88 m)
- Listed weight: 245 lb (111 kg)

Career information
- High school: Shaw (Columbus)
- College: Georgia Tech
- NFL draft: 2008: 3rd round, 93rd overall pick

Career history
- Indianapolis Colts (2008–2011); Oakland Raiders (2012); Miami Dolphins (2013–2014); San Francisco 49ers (2015)*; Atlanta Falcons (2015–2016); Arizona Cardinals (2017)
- * Offseason or practice squad member only

Awards and highlights
- 2× Second-team All-ACC (2006, 2007)

Career NFL statistics
- Total tackles: 552
- Sacks: 6.5
- Forced fumbles: 4
- Fumble recoveries: 2
- Stats at Pro Football Reference

Philip Gregory Wheeler (born December 12, 1984) is an American former professional football player who was a linebacker in the National Football League (NFL). He was selected by the Indianapolis Colts in the third round of the 2008 NFL draft. He played college football for the Georgia Tech Yellow Jackets.

Wheeler was also a member of the Oakland Raiders, Miami Dolphins, San Francisco 49ers, Atlanta Falcons, and Arizona Cardinals.

== Early life ==
In 2000, Wheeler, a sophomore, helped lead the Shaw High School football team to win the Georgia High School Association's AAAA Football State Championship. As a senior, he was named as an Honorable Mention All-Region selection by PrepStar and the Atlanta Journal-Constitution named him as a first team Class AAAA All-State selection.

== College career ==
In the 2005 season, Wheeler recorded 65 total tackles, 11.5 tackles-for-loss, 4.5 sacks, four interceptions, eight passes defended, and one forced fumble. In the 2006 season, he recorded 89 total tackles, 14.5 tackles-for-loss, nine sacks, five passes defended, one forced fumble, and one fumble recovery. In the 2007 season, he recorded 89 total tackles, nine tackles-for-loss, six sacks, five passes defended, one forced fumble, and one fumble recovery.

== Professional career ==
Pre-draft measurables
Height	Weight	Arm length	Hand span	40-yard dash	10-yard split	20-yard split	20-yard shuttle	Three-cone drill	Vertical jump	Broad jump	Bench press
6 ft 1 7/8 in (1.88 m)	245 lb (111 kg)	33 in (0.84 m)	9 3/4 in (0.25 m)	4.66 s	1.55 s	2.65 s	4.29 s	7.11 s	36.5 in (0.93 m)	10 ft 2 in (3.10 m)	24 reps

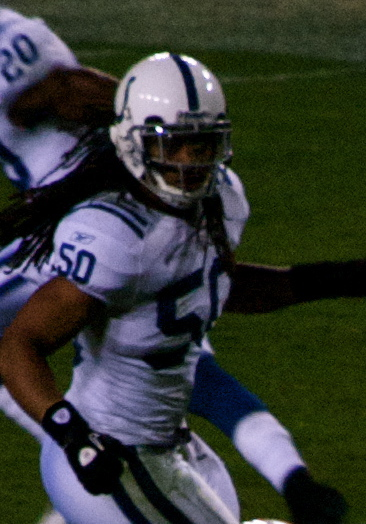
Wheeler (#50) with the Indianapolis Colts, 2010.

=== Indianapolis Colts ===
Wheeler was selected by the Indianapolis Colts in the third round (93rd pick) of the 2008 NFL draft. He played for the Colts from 2008 to 2011.

=== Oakland Raiders ===
Wheeler signed a one-year contract with the Oakland Raiders on March 30, 2012. He had a career year totaling 109 tackles, three sacks, and two forced fumbles.

=== Miami Dolphins ===
Wheeler signed with the Miami Dolphins on March 12, 2013, to a 5-year, $25 million deal with $13 million guaranteed. Wheeler was brought in to replace Kevin Burnett. Wheeler was released by the Dolphins on March 10, 2015.

=== San Francisco 49ers ===
Wheeler was signed by the San Francisco 49ers on April 30, 2015. He was released by the 49ers on September 4.

=== Atlanta Falcons ===
Wheeler signed with the Atlanta Falcons on October 20, 2015.

In the 2016 season, Wheeler and the Falcons reached Super Bowl LI, where they faced the New England Patriots on February 5, 2017. In the Super Bowl, he had one total tackle as the Falcons fell in a 34–28 overtime defeat.

=== Arizona Cardinals ===
On July 27, 2017, Wheeler signed with the Arizona Cardinals. He was released on September 8, 2017, but was re-signed a few days later. He was released again on September 15, 2017, but re-signed a few days later, only to be released again on September 25.

== NFL career statistics ==
Legend
**Bold**	Career high

=== Regular season ===
Year	Team	Games		Tackles					Interceptions					Fumbles			
Year	Team	GP	GS	Cmb	Solo	Ast	Sck	TFL	Int	Yds	TD	Lng	PD	FF	FR	Yds	TD
2008	IND	**16**	0	14	12	2	0.0	1	0	0	0	0	0	0	0	0	0
2009	IND	**16**	7	61	42	19	1.0	3	0	0	0	0	1	1	0	0	0
2010	IND	**16**	6	61	40	21	0.0	1	0	0	0	0	1	0	0	0	0
2011	IND	13	11	85	48	**37**	1.0	3	0	0	0	0	0	0	0	0	0
2012	OAK	**16**	**16**	110	78	32	**3.0**	**5**	0	0	0	0	6	**2**	**1**	0	0
2013	MIA	**16**	**16**	**118**	**83**	35	0.5	**5**	0	0	0	0	**7**	0	**1**	0	0
2014	MIA	15	4	46	35	11	0.0	3	0	0	0	0	0	0	0	0	0
2015	ATL	9	2	29	21	8	1.0	1	0	0	0	0	0	1	0	0	0
2016	ATL	**16**	4	28	18	10	0.0	3	0	0	0	0	0	0	0	0	0
Career		133	66	552	377	175	6.5	25	0	0	0	0	15	4	2	0	0

=== Playoffs ===
Year	Team	Games		Tackles					Interceptions					Fumbles			
Year	Team	GP	GS	Cmb	Solo	Ast	Sck	TFL	Int	Yds	TD	Lng	PD	FF	FR	Yds	TD
2008	IND	1	0	1	1	0	0.0	0	0	0	0	0	0	0	0	0	0
2009	IND	**3**	**3**	**7**	**5**	**2**	0.0	0	0	0	0	0	0	0	0	0	0
2010	IND	1	0	1	0	1	0.0	0	0	0	0	0	0	0	0	0	0
2016	ATL	**3**	1	2	2	0	0.0	0	0	0	0	0	0	0	0	0	0
Career		8	4	11	8	3	0.0	0	0	0	0	0	0	0	0	0	0
