= 247Sports =

College sports website focused on news and recruiting

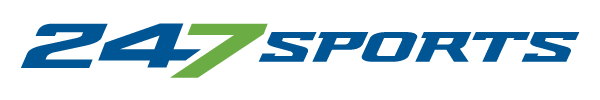

- Screenshot of 247Sports on July 22, 2021
- Website type: Sports
- Available in: English
- Headquarters: Nashville, Tennessee
- Owner: Skydance Corporation
- Founder: Shannon Terry
- Parent: CBS Sports Digital
- Website: 247sports.com US only
- Commercial: Yes
- Launched: August 1, 2010; 16 years ago

247Sports is an American network of websites that focus mainly on athletic recruitment in college football and basketball. It is owned and operated by Skydance Corporation under their CBS Sports Digital division.

The website hosts a large network of team-specific subsites, with each subsite being dedicated to a specific school. As of 2021, there is a subsite for every NCAA Division I FBS team, as well as many notable NCAA Division I FCS teams from conferences such as the Big Sky Conference, Missouri Valley Conference, and Southland Conference.

== History ==
The network was started in 2010 and gained popularity as other sports news media publications began citing 247Sports as a source. Early examples include the Dallas Morning News and The Washington Post. The site also provided special reports on recruiting to sports news media including Sports Illustrated.

In November 2012, 247Sports announced a content partnership with CBS Sports, in which 247Sports would provide content for its digital platforms (including CBSSports.com), and CBS Sports Digital would handle advertising sales for the site. In May 2013, 247Sports reached a long-term agreement to become the official online selection partner of the U.S. Army All-American Bowl and the U.S. Army National Combine, replacing its competitor Rivals.com. In December 2015, CBS announced that it had acquired 247Sports. As of 2022, 247Sports' content operations remain closely aligned with CBSSports.com. In addition, 247Sports personalities frequently appear as expert analysts on CBS Sports HQ.

In February 2017, 247Sports acquired Scout.com. In October 2017, 247Sports announced a partnership with Pro Football Focus, in which it would provide coverage of Division I FBS college football for the website, including a PFF College microsite and integration of its player grades and rankings across 247Sports.

In early 2020, 247Sports.com hired Columbus, Georgia native sportscaster Josh Pate to host a show on the 247Sports YouTube channel called "Late Kick Live". In August 2020, founder and CEO Shannon Terry left the company. In 2021, the company relocated from its original home in Brentwood, Tennessee, to Nashville, where it now shares facilities with Paramount's Country Music Television.

== 247Sports Composite ==
247Sports features two ratings for high school football and basketball recruits: its own in-house evaluations done by its scouting staff, and 247Sports Composite ratings. The Composite aggregates the public ratings for a prospect by the major recruiting services using a propriety algorithm. The Composite combines recruitment ratings from 247Sports' in-house ratings, Rivals.com, and ESPN in order to provide an overall rating for each recruit. The resulting rankings can be considered an industry consensus on the top recruits in the nation.

The Composite does not include any athletes that do not yet have a recruiting profile on 247Sports in order to prevent spoofs from other sites.

== Rating scale ==
The three major recruitment networks (247Sports, Rivals.com, ESPN) all have different scales for what their star ratings mean. Below is the college football rating scale used by 247Sports, per the website.

- Five stars

A five star rating is awarded to athletes who are graded with a 98–110 rating (.98–1.00 Composite).

For the 247Sports in-house ratings, five star ratings are given to the top 32 recruits in each recruiting class to mirror the 32 first round picks in the NFL draft. These 32 recruits from each recruiting class are the players who 247Sports analysts believe are the most likely to be first round NFL draft picks in the future. Any player with a rating of 100–110 is considered a potential “franchise player” and are not present in every recruiting class.

- Four stars

A four star rating is awarded to athletes who are graded with a 90–97 rating (.90–.97 Composite).

Four star ratings are given to recruits who analysts believe will have successful college careers that likely result in being drafted. By National Signing Day, this number is generally in the range of 350 prospects, which is roughly the top 10 percent of prospects in a given recruiting class.

- Three stars

A three star rating is awarded to athletes who are graded with an 80–89 rating (.80–.89 Composite). 247Sports breaks these recruits into three categories:

- High three star (87–89): A recruit with significant NFL upside who analysts expect to be an impact college football player at the Power Five level.
- Mid three star (84–86): A recruit who analysts consider to be a capable starter for a Power Five team or an impact player at the Group of Five level.
- Low three star (80–83): A recruit who analysts consider as a potential contributor for a Power Five program, but more likely a Group of Five starter.

This is where the bulk of college football prospects are rated. Three star ratings incorporate a wide range of ability levels and potential.

- Two stars

A two star rating is awarded to athletes who are graded with a 70–79 rating (.70–.79 Composite).

Two star ratings are given to prospects who analysts believe can be potential Division I FBS-level players at the Group of Five level, or a Division I FCS starter. These recruits generally have very limited NFL potential.

- Unrated

Athletes who would receive a rating under 70 remain unrated, as recruiters do not award one star ratings. These players may walk on at Division I FBS schools, play at NCAA Division I FCS, NCAA Division II, NCAA Division III or NAIA schools, or may not participate in collegiate athletics altogether.

== 247Sports Rankings ==
=== #1 Ranked Football Players ===
| Year | Player name | Position | High School |
|---|---|---|---|
| 2010 | Ronald Powell | Defensive End | Rancho Verde HS (CA) |
| 2011 | Jadeveon Clowney | Defensive End | South Pointe HS (SC) |
| 2012 | Mario Edwards Jr. | Defensive Tackle | Denton Ryan (TX) |
| 2013 | Robert Nkemdiche | Defensive End | Grayson HS (GA) |
| 2014 | Myles Garrett | Defensive End | Martin HS (TX) |
| 2015 | Trenton Thompson | Defensive Tackle | Westover HS (GA) |
| 2016 | Rashan Gary | Defensive Tackle | Paramus Catholic HS (NJ) |
| 2017 | Walker Little | Offensive Tackle | Episcopal HS (TX) |
| 2018 | Trevor Lawrence | Quarterback | Cartersville HS (GA) |
| 2019 | Antonio Alfano | Defensive End | Colonia HS (NJ) |
| 2020 | Bryce Young | Quarterback | Mater Dei HS (CA) |
| 2021 | Quinn Ewers | Quarterback | Southlake Carroll HS (TX) |
| 2022 | Travis Hunter | Cornerback | Collins Hill HS (GA) |
| 2023 | Arch Manning | Quarterback | Isidore Newman HS (LA) |
| 2024 | Jeremiah Smith | Wide Receiver | Chaminade-Madonna Prep (FL) |
| 2025 | Bryce Underwood | Quarterback | Belleville HS (MI) |
| 2026 | Keisean Henderson | Quarterback | Legacy the School of Sport Sciences (TX) |

=== #1 Ranked Basketball Players ===
| Year | Player | High School |
|---|---|---|
| 2011 | Anthony Davis | Perspectives Charter HS, IL |
| 2012 | Nerlens Noel | Tilton School, NH |
| 2013 | Andrew Wiggins | Huntington Prep, WV |
| 2014 | Emmanuel Mudiay | Prime Prep Academy, TX |
| 2015 | Ben Simmons | Montverde Academy, FL |
| 2016 | Josh Jackson | Prolific Prep, CA |
| 2017 | Marvin Bagley | Sierra Canyon, CA |
| 2018 | R.J. Barrett | Montverde Academy, FL |
| 2019 | Anthony Edwards | Holy Spirit Preparatory School, GA |
| 2020 | Cade Cunningham | Montverde Academy, FL |
| 2021 | Chet Holmgren | Minnehaha Academy, MN |
| 2022 | Nick Smith Jr. | North Little Rock, AR |
| 2023 | Ron Holland | Duncanville High School, TX |
| 2024 | Cooper Flagg | Montverde Academy, FL |
| 2025 | Darryn Peterson | Prolific Prep, CA |
| 2026 | Tyran Stokes | Rainier Beach High School, WA |
