= List of mayors of Columbus, Georgia =

This is a list of mayors and intendants of the city of Columbus, Georgia, United States, since its founding in 1828.

== Intendants ==
- Ulysess S. Lewis (1828)
- James Van Ness (1829)
- Sowell Woolfork (1830)
- Samuel Lawhorn (1831)
- Allen Lawhon (1832–1834)
- James C. Watson (1835)

== Mayors ==
- John Fontaine (1836–1837)
- James S. Calhoun (1838–1839)
- George D. McDougal (1840)
- W. H. Harper (1841)
- John L. Lewis (1842–1843)
- Jacob I. Moses (1844)
- L. B. Moody (1845)
- Hohn G. Winters (1846–1847)
- Wiley Williams (1848)
- S. W. Flournoy (1849–1850)
- Willis S. Holstead (1851–1852)
- J. L. Morton (1853)
- John E. Bacon (1854)
- Wiley Williams (1855)
- F. G. Wilkins (1856–1860)
- W. S. Holstead (1861)
- D. B. Thompson (1862)
- John F. Bozeman (1864)
- F. G. Wilkins (1864–May 1868)
- Capt. William Mills, 16th U.S. Infantry (May 1868–April 1869), Military Reconstruction
- John McIlhenny (April 1869 – 1870)
- S. B. Cleghorn (1871)
- John McIlhenny (1872)
- S. B. Cleghorn (1873)
- John McIlhenny (1874–1876)
- S. G. Cleghorn (1877)
- F. G. Wilkins (1878–1881)
- Cliff B. Grimes (1882–1889)
- D. P. Dozier (1890–1891)
- J. J. Slade (1892–1895)
- Cliff B. Grimes (1896–1897)
- L. H. Chappell (1898–1907)
- Rhodes Browne (1908–1911)
- L. H. Chappell (1912–1913)
- John C. Cook (1914–1916)
- D. L. Parmer (1917–1919)
- Joe L. Couch (1920–1921)
- J. Homer Dimon (1922–1931)
- H. C. Smith (1932–1934)
- J. Homer Dimon (1935)
- Luther Clinton Wilson (1936–1938)
- James Barton Knight, Jr. (1939)
- Edward Murrah (1940–1942)
- W. G. Bridges (1943)
- Sterling Albrecht (1944–1946)
- Walter A. Richards (1947–1949)
- Ralph A. Sayers (1950)
- B. F. Register (1951–1952)
- Lawrence Shields (1953)
- Ralph A. Sayers (1954)
- C. Ed Berry (1955)
- Robert T. Davis (1956)
- B.F. Register (1957–1959)
- B. Ed Johnson (1960–1961)
- Steve Knight (1962)
- Harold E. Hughes (1963–1965)
- B. Ed Johnson (1965–1969), first full-time mayor elected by voters
- J. R. Allen (1969 – February 1973)
- A. J. McClung (February–April 1973)
- Bob D. Hydrick (April 1973–1975)
- Jack P. Mickle (1975–1979)
- Harry C. Jackson (1979–1983)
- J. W. Feighner (1983–1987)
- James E. Jernigan (1987–1991)
- Frank K. Martin (1991–1995)
- Bobby G. Peters (1995–2003)
- Robert Poydasheff (2003–2007)
- Jim Wetherington (2007–2011)
- Teresa Tomlinson (2011–2019), first female mayor
- Berry "Skip" Henderson (2019–present)
- Isaiah Hugley (elect)

== See also ==
- Timeline of Columbus, Georgia
