= Walter Palmore =

American football player (born 1996)

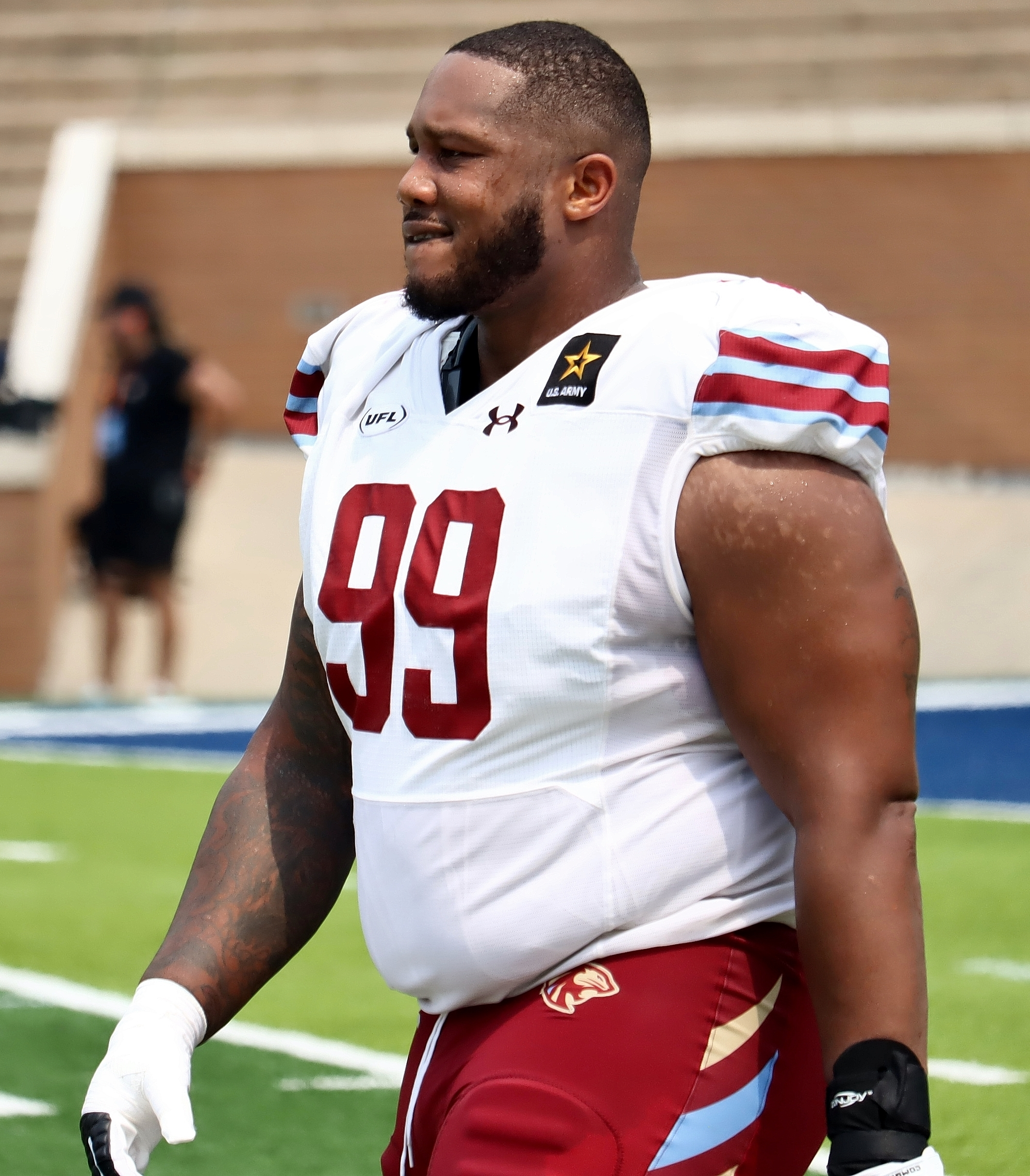
- Palmore with the Michigan Panthers in 2024

No. 99 – Columbus Aviators
- Position: Defensive tackle
- Roster status: Active

Personal information
- Born: August 9, 1996 (age 30); Columbus, Georgia, U.S.
- Listed height: 6 ft 3 in (1.91 m)
- Listed weight: 339 lb (154 kg)

Career information
- High school: Hardaway (GA)
- College: Missouri
- NFL draft: 2019: undrafted

Career history
- Houston Texans (2019)*; Houston Roughnecks (2020); Dallas Cowboys (2020); Seattle Seahawks (2021)*; Carolina Panthers (2021)*; Michigan Panthers (2022–2024); Carolina Panthers (2024)*; Michigan Panthers (2025); Columbus Aviators (2026–present)
- * Offseason or practice squad member only

Career NFL statistics
- Games played: 1
- Stats at Pro Football Reference

Walter Palmore (born August 9, 1996) is an American professional football defensive tackle for the Columbus Aviators of the United Football League (UFL). He played college football at the University of Missouri.

== Early life ==
Palmore attended Hardaway High School. He played only one season of football as a senior. He enrolled at Coffeyville Community College, where he was redshirted in 2014.

He transferred to Eastern Arizona Junior College in 2015. As a freshman, he tallied 36 tackles and five quarterback sacks. As a sophomore, he made 35 tackles (1.5 for loss), three quarterback sacks and one forced fumble.

As a junior, he transferred to the University of Missouri. He appeared in 10 games and registered 13 tackles. He had 6 tackles in the season opener against the Missouri State University. He made 4 tackles (one for loss) and two quarterback pressures against the University of Tennessee.

As a senior, he started all 13 games, posting 31 tackles (ninth on the team), four tackles for loss, one sack, two quarterback pressures, two pass break ups and one blocked kick. He had three tackles against Oklahoma State University in the 2018 Liberty Bowl.

== Professional career ==
Pre-draft measurables
Height	Weight	Arm length	Hand span	Wingspan	40-yard dash	10-yard split	20-yard split	20-yard shuttle	Three-cone drill	Vertical jump	Broad jump	Bench press
6 ft 3 in (1.91 m)	317 lb (144 kg)	33 5/8 in (0.85 m)	9 3/4 in (0.25 m)	6 ft 10 3/8 in (2.09 m)	5.23 s	1.80 s	3.07 s	4.82 s	8.18 s	32.5 in (0.83 m)	9 ft 4 in (2.84 m)	19 reps
All values from Pro Day

=== Houston Texans ===
Palmore was signed as an undrafted free agent by the Houston Texans after the 2019 NFL draft on May 10. On July 21, he was placed on the active/non-football injury list. On July 31, he was moved to the active roster after passing his physical. He was waived during final roster cuts on August 31.

=== Houston Roughnecks ===
In 2020, he was selected by the Houston Roughnecks in the Phase #5 portion of the 2020 XFL draft. He appeared in two games, registering six tackles (one for loss), 0.5 sacks and one quarterback pressure. In March, amid the COVID-19 pandemic, the league announced that it would be cancelling the rest of the season. In April, the XFL suspended operations and filed for bankruptcy, and he had his contract terminated on April 10.

=== Dallas Cowboys ===
On October 21, 2020, he was signed as a free agent by the Dallas Cowboys to their practice squad. On November 13, he was placed on the practice squad/COVID-19 list, and restored to the practice squad on December 2. He was elevated to the active roster on January 2, 2021, for the team's week 17 game against the New York Giants, and reverted to the practice squad after the game. On January 4, he signed a reserve/future contract with the Cowboys. On May 5, 2021, he was waived after the Cowboys used eight of their 11 selections in the 2021 NFL draft on defensive players.

=== Seattle Seahawks ===
On May 13, 2021, Palmore signed with the Seattle Seahawks. He was waived on August 16, 2021.

=== Carolina Panthers ===
On August 18, 2021, Palmore signed with the Carolina Panthers. He was waived on August 23.

=== Michigan Panthers ===
On April 1, 2022, Palmore signed with the Michigan Panthers of the United States Football League (USFL). He appeared in nine games and made 17 tackles. On June 17, 2022, he was transferred to the inactive roster. He was transferred to the team's inactive roster again on March 19, 2023. and activated from the suspended list on March 26.

Palmore re-signed with the Panthers on July 25, 2023. His contract was terminated on August 10, 2024, to sign with an NFL team.

=== Carolina Panthers (second stint) ===
Palmore signed with the Carolina Panthers on August 11, 2024. On August 27, 2024, Palmore was waived by the Panthers and re-signed to the practice squad the next day, but released a few days later.

=== Michigan Panthers (second stint) ===
Palmore re-signed with the Michigan Panthers on September 18, 2024. He was placed on injured reserve on May 6, 2025.

On July 5, 2025, Palmore re-signed with the Panthers.

=== Columbus Aviators ===
On January 12, 2026, Palmore was allocated to the Columbus Aviators of the United Football League (UFL).
