= Mark Immelman =

South African sportcaster, coach, author

- Born: Mark Immelman; October 2, 1970 (age 55); Somerset West, South Africa
- Education: Columbus State University
- Occupations: Sports announcer, golf coach, author
- Website: Official Website

Mark Immelman (born October 2, 1970) is a South African sportscaster, golf teaching professional and author.

Immelman is currently the host of the On the Mark podcast on pgatour.com. He also covers live golf for the PGA Tour on ESPN+ for PGA Tour Live, and CBS Sports. Mark is also an analyst on “The Second Cut” podcast and a golf analyst for CBS Sports HQ. In addition to his broadcasting career, he's also a published author.

Mark is the older brother of 2008 Masters champion Trevor Immelman and son of former South African Sunshine Tour commissioner, Johan Immelman.

== Amateur career ==
In four seasons playing for Columbus State, Immelman was a three-time All-American (1992, 94, 95) and a two-time Academic All-American while winning multiple national championships (1992, 94) with Columbus State.

== Coaching ==
After coaching players on the European Tour, Immelman was the head men's golf coach at Columbus State University between 2001 and 2021.

== Author ==
Immelman has had instructional articles published in Compleat Golfer (South Africa) and Golf Digest South Africa. He has also authored the swing sequences of a number of leading golf professionals, including Major Champions, for both publications. He has also been published in Golf Digest USA and has had some of his "On the Mark – Tips from The PGA Tour podcasts" published in Golf Magazine.

He is also a published author of two eBooks. His first effort, Scandalously Simple – The Easy Way to Accurate Golf Shot was published and then recrafted; and a second edition of the book is for sale on Apple Books. A second eBook, Golf is a Game of Recovery is also available.

== Broadcasting career ==
Immelman got his start in golf broadcast when he made a number of appearances as a guest announcer on SuperSport TV in South Africa for various co-sanctioned Sunshine Tour events including the South African Open and the Alfred Dunhill Championship. In those early days, he was also afforded the opportunity to be a part of the European Tour Productions broadcast crew for the Joburg Open on the European Tour.

His career in broadcast on the PGA Tour began when he was included on the SiriusXM PGA Tour Radio crew for the 2012 A Military Tribute at the Greenbrier. Immelman parlayed that outing into a 6-year tenure as one of Sirius XM PGA Tour Radio's leading play-by-play voices. His radio experience led to him hosting his own live streaming radio show called "On the Mark" on pgatour.com. The show aired for three days per week in 2015 and after one season the PGA Tour driven radio initiative morphed into a podcast called "On the Mark." The first podcast was released in February 2016, and to date it has been downloaded over 6 Million times in over 125 countries.

Immelman's broadcast work for the PGA Tour also included him being a part of the "Live @" crew for pgatour.com for a short stint. The PGA Tour Entertainment Network grew steadily and became a digital subscription-based streaming service called PGA Tour LIVE. Immelman (among others) was hired as one of the in-studio analysts as well as an on-course announcer for PGA Tour LIVE and has been a prominent announcer with the network since its inception.

While working for PGA Tour Live, Immelman has also appeared on DirecTV's featured groups coverage of various PGA Tour events, and the DirecTV LaunchPad Channel as an announcer and analyst.

His work on PGA Tour Live led to him being hired by CBS Sports as a part of their 4K Television broadcast of the 2016 PGA Championship at Baltusrol, NJ. His work in 4K expanded when he was offered analyst roles on The Masters broadcasts of "Masters On the Range," “Featured Groups" and "Amen Corner." His career in the 4K broadcasts also had him being used as an on-course announcer, and he continued to grow and impress in his role at CBS Sports and he was eventually promoted and became a member of the Golf on CBS Sports network show announce crew in 2018.

Immelman is also an analyst on the CBS Sports digital podcast "The First Cut" and a golf analyst for CBS Sports HQ.

In his combined radio and television career, Immelman has broadcast two of the four Majors in professional golf (The Masters and the PGA Championship). He has also been an announcer at a number of World Golf Championships (WGC) events. He has also announced and called three Presidents Cups.

== Team appearances ==
- Palmer Cup (representing International Team): 2019 (winners, non-playing captain)

== Awards ==
2009 NCAA Division II Coach of the Year
2017 Columbus State Athletics Hall of Fame inductee

== Personal life ==
Immelman lives with his wife, Tracy, and two daughters in Columbus, Georgia.
