= Josh Pate (sports commentator) =

American college football analyst

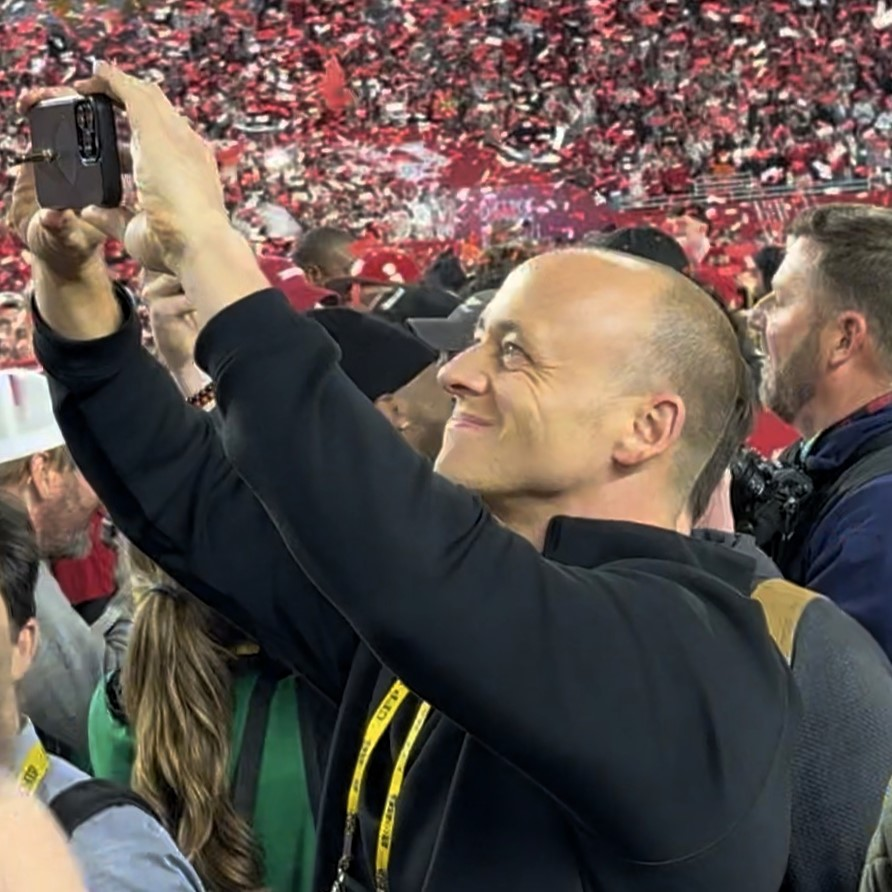
- Pate covering the 2026 CFP National Championship
- Born: Columbus, Georgia, U.S.
- Education: Columbus State University (BA)
- Occupations: College football analyst, sports journalist
- Years active: 2011–present
- Known for: Josh Pate's College Football Show

Josh Pate is an American sports analyst and host known for his coverage of college football. He is the creator and host of Josh Pate's College Football Show and serves as a contributor for ESPN.

== Career ==
After two years at a fabric warehouse, Pate began working in sports media after reaching out to Columbus, Georgia's ESPN Radio affiliate. He made his radio debut and later joined the local NBC affiliate, where he hosted a college football television show and worked as sports director and anchor. He eventually scaled back his role to launch Late Kick, his own live-streamed show. In January 2020, it was picked up by 247Sports.

In August 2024, he signed a new contract with CBS Sports, renaming Late Kick to Josh Pate's College Football Show and relocating production to Nashville. The arrangement allowed him to retain ownership of the show while utilizing CBS' larger distribution network.

In August 2025, it was acquired by On3 Sports. That same month, Pate launched The Locker Room: CFB with former NFL players Will Compton and Taylor Lewan as part of the Bussin' With The Boys brand, and ESPN announced he would be joining them as a contributor.
