= Woodrow Wilson College of Law =

Law school in Atlanta, Georgia (1933–1989)

- Active: 1933–1989
- Founders: Governor Clifford Walker and Joseph B. Kilbride
- Other students: Approved by the Georgia Bar Examiners to issue Bachelor of Laws, Juris Doctor, and Master of Laws degrees
- Location: Atlanta, Georgia, United States

The Woodrow Wilson College of Law was a private law school for working professionals and others seeking a legal education. The school was established in 1933 along with John Marshall Law School. Woodrow Wilson College of Law faculty members were practicing lawyers and judges from across the state of Georgia.

== History ==
In 1933, Governor Clifford Walker and Joseph B. Kilbride, began night law classes for those who were unable to attend law classes during the day. Woodrow Wilson College of Law was incorporated under the laws of the State of Georgia.

Woodrow Wilson College of Law employed an innovation in teaching. A written test is given at the close of each class, and a special grader was employed to grade the tests, which were returned to the students. The graders are rotated, giving the students clear and welcome feedback for the Bar Exam. This innovation was cited in the Mercer Law Review.

After repeated unsuccessful efforts to obtain American Bar Association accreditation, Woodrow Wilson College of Law entered negotiations in 1981 with Georgia State University and the Georgia Board of Regents about a possible takeover that would have created Georgia State University Woodrow Wilson College of Law. After several years of legal negotiations, the Georgia Board of Regents approved the takeover, but the American Bar Association did not grant accreditation to the merged arrangement because of legal issues and concerns about the institutions’ differing status as a private law school and a state university.

The college's library was donated to Oglethorpe University, in return for it holding the transcripts of the college's former students.

== Student life ==
The college had chapters of the Sigma Delta Kappa professional law fraternity and Iota Tau Tau law sorority.

== Notable alumni ==
- Charles L. Carnes – Georgia House of Representatives and chief judge of the Fulton County State Court
- Jack W. Carter – Georgia House of Representatives
- Albert B. Collier (law degree 1982 and Master of Law 1987) – chief judge of the Clayton County Adult Felony Drug Court; adjunct professor with Clayton College and State University
- Terry Coleman – Speaker of the Georgia House of Representatives
- Constance Curry – civil rights activist
- Jerry Max Davis – Georgia House of Representatives
- Colonel William Charles Dominy, Director, Department of Public Safety of the Georgia State Patrol
- Tom Forkner – co-founder of restaurant chain Waffle House
- Richard Foxworth – senior judge with the DeKalb County Magistrate Court
- Stan Gunter – Georgia House of Representatives and judge of the Georgia Superior Court for the Enotah Circuit
- Juanita Marsh – appointed in 1971 as a municipal court judge in College Park, becoming the third female judge in Georgia
- Murphy Miller – chief judge of the Enotah Judicial Circuit (2012–2018), founder of the Enotah Mental Health Court
- Thelma Van Norte – medical librarian
- Bobby Peters – Mayor of Columbus, Georgia, and Superior Court judge in Columbus, Georgia
- Bobby Prince – video game composer
- Murray M. Silver Jr.- co-author of Great Balls of Fire The Uncensored Story of Jerry Lee Lewis ( ISBN 0-688-01384-8)
- Pam Stephenson – Georgia House of Representatives
- Fletcher Thompson – U.S. House of Representatives and Georgia State Senate

== See also ==
- List of defunct law schools in the United States
