= Robert Poydasheff =

American attorney and politician (1930–2020)

Bob Poydasheff
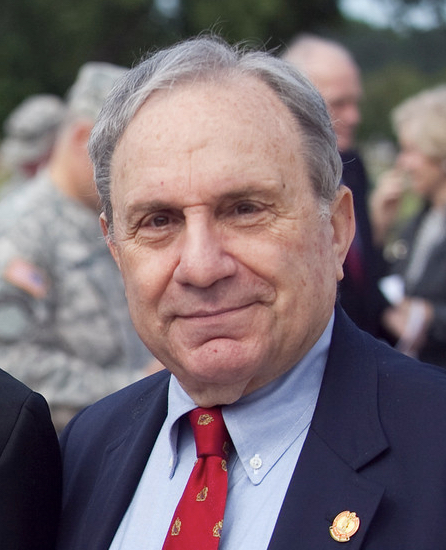

66th Mayor of Columbus, Georgia
- In office January 2003 – January 3, 2007
- Preceded by: Bobby Peters
- Succeeded by: Jim Wetherington

Personal details
- Born: Robert Stephen Poydasheff; February 13, 1930 Bronx, New York, U.S.
- Died: September 24, 2020 (aged 90) Phenix City, Alabama, U.S.
- Party: Republican
- Spouse: Stacy Latto (m. 1954)
- Education: The Citadel (BA); Tulane University (JD); Boston University (MA)
- Occupation: Lawyer, politician

Military service
- Allegiance: United States
- Branch/service: United States Army
- Years of service: 1955–1979
- Rank: Colonel
- Unit: J.A.G. Corps
- Battles/wars: Vietnam War
- Awards: Legion of Merit; Commendation Medal

Robert Stephen Poydasheff (13 February 1930 – 24 September 2020) was an American attorney and politician who served one term as mayor of Columbus, Georgia, from 2003 to 2007. A retired military officer, he served in the United States Army for twenty-four years, retiring at the rank of colonel.

== Early life and education ==
Poydasheff was born and raised in The Bronx in New York City; he attended DeWitt Clinton High School.

He earned a B.A. in political science from The Citadel in 1954, a J.D. from Tulane University Law School in 1957, an M.A. in international relations from Boston University's Graduate Program in Berlin, Germany in 1967, and attended The Hague Academy of International Law in The Netherlands.

== Military service ==
In May 1955, Poydasheff was commissioned as a second lieutenant in the infantry branch of the United States Army. After going on leave without pay to attend law school, he was reassigned to the Judge Advocate General's Corps. His assignments included acting as chief counsel to several high-ranking officers involved in the My Lai massacre and the Post Exchange scandal. A 1976 graduate of the United States Army War College, he served a total of twenty-four years, retiring as a colonel in 1979. In 2012, the Army War College Foundation named Colonel Poydasheff an Outstanding Alumnus in recognition of his wide-ranging service to his community after his retirement from active duty.

== Political career ==
Poydasheff served on the Columbus city council from 1994 to 2002. He was elected mayor in 2002, defeating fellow counselor Richard H. Smith and former state representative Jed Harris. He was unsuccessful in his 2006 bid for re-election to a second term and was succeeded by former Columbus police chief Jim Wetherington.

A Republican, Poydasheff described himself as ideologically similar to Colin Powell. He supported Democrat Teresa Tomlinson in her successful 2010 mayoral run.

== Personal life ==
Poydasheff was married to the former Anastasia "Stacy" Catherine Latto, and had two children, Catherine Alexandra Ross and Robert S. Poydasheff Jr.

Poydasheff died on 24 September 2020 after a brief illness.

Political offices
Preceded by	Member of the Columbus City Council from the 2nd district 1995–2003	Succeeded by Glenn Davis
Preceded by Bobby Peters	Mayor of Columbus, Georgia; 2003–2007	Succeeded by Jim Wetherington
