= Wesly Mallard =

American football player (born 1978)

No. 51, 53, 96, 54
- Position: Linebacker

Personal information
- Born: November 21, 1978 (age 47); Columbus, Georgia, U.S.
- Listed height: 6 ft 1 in (1.85 m)
- Listed weight: 230 lb (104 kg)

Career information
- High school: Hardaway (Columbus)
- College: Oregon
- NFL draft: 2002: 6th round, 188th overall pick

Career history
- New York Giants (2002–2004); New England Patriots (2005); Tampa Bay Buccaneers (2005–2006); Denver Broncos (2007)*; Seattle Seahawks (2008)
- * Offseason or practice squad member only

Awards and highlights
- Second-team All-Pac-10 (2001)
- Stats at Pro Football Reference

Wesly Allen Mallard (born November 21, 1978) is an American former professional football player who was a linebacker in the National Football League (NFL). He played college football for the Oregon Ducks and was selected by the New York Giants in the sixth round of the 2002 NFL draft.

Mallard was a member of the New England Patriots, Tampa Bay Buccaneers, Denver Broncos and Seattle Seahawks, in addition to the Giants.

== Biography ==
He attended Seoul American High School in Seoul, Korea and later went on to attend Hardaway High School in Columbus, Georgia in the United States.

He walked on to the University of Oregon and eventually led the defense in personal tackles in his senior year. He made a name for himself early in his college career on a controversial block he made on Michael Jolivette from Arizona during a punt return in 2000.

He was selected by the New York Giants in the sixth round of the 2002 NFL draft.
