= B. Ed Johnson =

American politician

Mayor of Columbus, Georgia
- In office 1960–1961; 1965–1968
- Preceded by: Benjamin Franklin Register; Harold E. Hughes
- Succeeded by: Steve Knight; J. R. Allen

Member of the Georgia Senate from the 24th district
- In office November 28, 1945 – ?
- Preceded by: H. Dixon Smith

Personal details
- Born: October 28, 1914 Columbus, Georgia, US
- Died: June 8, 1983 (aged 68) Muscogee County, Georgia, US
- Party: Democratic
- Spouse(s): Martha Louise Noble; Harriette V. Murray
- Occupation: Legislator, businessman

Benjamin Edward Johnson (October 28, 1914 – June 8, 1983) was an American businessman, broadcaster and politician from the U.S. state of Georgia. He resided in Columbus in Muscogee County, where he was the first elected mayor of that city, from 1965 to 1968.

== Early years and education ==
Johnson was born in 1914 to Edward Burton and Pamelia Weldon Johnson. His father was also a prominent citizen of the city, serving as the city's Superintendent of Public Works in the 1930s.

Johnson attended public schools in Columbus, and married Martha Louise Noble in 1939.

== Political career ==
In 1945, Johnson was elected to the Georgia State Senate's 24th district, to fill the unexpired term of the deceased H. Dixon Smith. At that time, he was the youngest state senator to ever hold that office from that district. He was named mayor pro tempore of Columbus in 1960, serving for one year. Previously, he had served as secretary and city commissioner of Columbus. He was returned to the mayor's office in 1965, but this time by registered voters in the city of Columbus, becoming the first elected mayor of the city. At some time during his tenure, the Miss Georgia USA beauty pageant, which he helped lay the foundation for, came to Columbus. He was succeeded as mayor by J. R. Allen in 1969.

== Business background and civic involvement ==
Johnson worked at the exchange in Fort Benning, Georgia, along with oil and lumber companies, in 1951 as sales manager of the Columbus Broadcasting Company and around 1959 a manager of Westad, a distributor of electronics. He was voted as Columbus' outstanding citizen of the year in 1946.

Johnson was a member of community organizations, including the Better Business Bureau, Chamber of Commerce, Lion's Club, Roofers' Manufacturing Association, and Columbus Country Club. A 1951 biography lauded his "ready smile and infectious friendliness" and described him as having "one of the largest contingents of friends ... in the community".

Johnson died in 1983 at the age of 68. At the time of his death, he was married to Harriette V. Murray.
