= J. Henry Harden =

American politician (1912–1982)

John Henry Harden (May 9, 1912 - 1982) was an agricultural county agent and Georgia state legislator. He went by his middle name, Henry, as was the custom then in the Deep South and signed his name J. Henry Harden.

== Early life and education ==
Harden was born May 9, 1912, in Osierfield, Georgia He graduated from South Georgia Junior State College, 1931. before earning a Bachelor of Science in Agriculture degree on June 9, 1936, from The University of Georgia. He was of the Baptist faith.

== Career ==
Harden was assistant county agricultural agent for Dodge County, Georgia from 1936-1938, then county agricultural agent for Wilkinson County, Georgia from 1938-1941, then county agent for Ben Hill Country from 1941 until 1948. He taught vocational agriculture at Lynwood High School.(later Ben Hill County Elementary School).

He served in the Georgia state legislature from 1949 to 1950 as a Democratic Representative from Ben Hill County. He then served in the Georgia state legislature from 1951 to 1953 as Senator for the 45th District, where he chaired the Committee on Agriculture.

== Personal life ==
Harden married Mary Juanita (Nita) Puckett August 20, 1939. He died in 1982 in Athens, Georgia at age 70. Harden's great-niece, Sharon Shewmake, is state legislator in Washington.
