= Jim Wetherington =

American politician (1937 or 1938 – 2025)

67th Mayor of Columbus, Georgia
- In office 2007–2011
- Preceded by: Robert Poydasheff
- Succeeded by: Teresa Tomlinson

Personal details
- Born: 1937 or 1938
- Died: January 6, 2025 (aged 87) Columbus, Georgia, U.S.
- Spouse: Shirley Wetherington
- Occupation: Policeman, politician

William J. "Jim" Wetherington (1937 or 1938 – January 6, 2025) was an American politician and policeman who served as the 67th mayor of Columbus, Georgia from 2007 to 2011.

Before being elected mayor, Wetherington served the city of Columbus as chief of police, and the state of Georgia as commissioner of the Georgia Department of Corrections, where he led the sixth largest prison system in the United States.

He was elected 67th mayor of that city in 2006, after defeating incumbent mayor Bob Poydasheff. As mayor, Wetherington raised taxes to increase the size of the Columbus police force, and worked to improve the mayor's office's relationship with the county school district.

In accordance with a promise to his wife, Wetherington chose not to run for reelection in the 2010 election despite high approval ratings. After leaving office at the end of his term in 2011, Wetherington was replaced by lawyer Teresa Tomlinson.

Wetherington died in Columbus on January 6, 2025, at the age of 87.

Political offices
Preceded by Bob Poydasheff	Mayor of Columbus, Georgia; 2007–2010	Succeeded by Teresa Tomlinson
