= Jack W. Carter =

American politician (1938–2019)

Member of the Georgia House of Representatives from the 146-2 district
- In office 1975–1976

Personal details
- Born: January 18, 1938 Cook County, Georgia, U.S.
- Died: September 5, 2019 (aged 81)
- Party: Democratic
- Education: Woodrow Wilson College of Law

Jack W. Carter (January 18, 1938 – September 5, 2019) was an American politician. He served as a Democratic member for the 146-2 district of the Georgia House of Representatives.

== Life and career ==
Carter was born in Cook County, Georgia. He attended Woodrow Wilson College of Law and served in the United States Army.

In 1975, Carter was elected to represent the 146-2 district of the Georgia House of Representatives, serving until 1976.

Carter died on September 5, 2019, at the age of 81.
