= Robert Steele (American football) =

American football player (born 1956)

No. 81, 82
- Position: Wide receiver

Personal information
- Born: August 2, 1956 (age 70); Columbus, Georgia, U.S.
- Listed height: 6 ft 4 in (1.93 m)
- Listed weight: 196 lb (89 kg)

Career information
- High school: Hardaway (Columbus)
- College: North Alabama
- NFL draft: 1978: undrafted

Career history
- Dallas Cowboys (1978); Minnesota Vikings (1979)

Awards and highlights
- All-GSC (1977); Second-team All-GSC (1976)

Career NFL statistics
- Receptions: 1
- Receiving yards: 10
- Stats at Pro Football Reference

Robert Hugh Steele (born August 2, 1956) is an American former professional football player who was a wide receiver in the National Football League (NFL) for the Dallas Cowboys and Minnesota Vikings. He played college football for the North Alabama Lions.

== Early life ==
Steele attended Hardaway High School in Columbus, Georgia, where he became a starter at tight end until his senior season. He accepted a scholarship from Division II University of North Alabama, where he became a two-year starter at wide receiver.

As a junior, he led the team with 30 receptions for 566 yards, a Gulf South Conference-leading 19.3 yards a reception and 5 touchdowns. The next year, the team implemented a run-oriented veer offense, but he still led with 24 receptions for 386 yards and one touchdown.

== Professional career ==
=== Dallas Cowboys ===
Steele was signed as an undrafted free agent by the Dallas Cowboys after the 1978 NFL draft. Although he was released prior to the final pre-season game, he was later re-signed on September 6 after the team traded wide receiver Golden Richards.

As a rookie, he was used only on special teams and didn't register a reception as the team's fourth wide receiver. He played in Super Bowl XIII. He was waived on August 27, 1979.

=== Minnesota Vikings ===
On August 29, 1979, the Minnesota Vikings claimed him off waivers. On November 25, he blocked a punt against the Tampa Bay Buccaneers. He was released on August 27, 1980.

== Publications ==
- Steele Here: An Underdog's Secret to Success ISBN 978-1-61254-010-8

== Personal life ==
Steele served on the Georgia State Legislature as an elected State Representative. His father owned the Columbus Astros, a minor league affiliate of the Houston Astros baseball team.
