= Frank Martin (mayor) =

American lawyer

Frank K. Martin

Mayor of Columbus, Georgia
- In office 1991–1994
- Preceded by: James Jernigan
- Succeeded by: Bobby Peters

Personal details
- Born: November 4, 1938 Columbus, Georgia
- Died: August 12, 2012 (aged 73) Columbus, Georgia
- Party: Democratic
- Spouse: Helen
- Children: Frank, Jr., John, Katherine
- Education: University of Georgia B.A. and J.D.
- Occupation: Mayor, attorney
- Nickname(s): Butch (called by childhood friends and family)

Frank Kieffer Martin (November 4, 1938 – August 12, 2012) was a prominent American defense attorney and a former mayor of Columbus, Georgia. Born in Columbus in 1938, Martin was elected as the 64th mayor of the city in 1990, taking over from James Jernigan.

During his tenure as mayor, Martin was instrumental in advocating for a new 1-percent sales tax that was used to fund the construction of a new civic center, public safety building, and recreational facilities. Additionally, Columbus won the bid to host the 1996 Olympic softball competition under Martin's leadership. He served as mayor from 1991 to 1994.

He died from complications of pancreatic cancer in 2012 at the age of 73.

| Preceded by James Jernigan | Mayor of Columbus, Georgia; 1991-1994 | Succeeded by Bobby Peters |
