= Bo Bartlett =

American artist (born 1955)

- Born: James William Bartlett III; December 29, 1955 (age 70); Columbus, Georgia, US
- Education: Pennsylvania Academy of Fine Arts
- Movement: American Realism

Bo Bartlett (born December 29, 1955) is an American realist painter, working in Columbus, Georgia and Wheaton Island, Maine.

== Early life ==
Bo Bartlett was born James William Bartlett III on December 29, 1955, in Columbus, Georgia. Bartlett’s parents, Opal and Bill Bartlett (James William Bartlett Jr.), were from Columbus. His father was a woodworker and furniture designer, and his mother was a medical librarian. At the age of 18 he traveled to Florence, Italy where he studied mural painting under the American expatriate, Ben Long. In 1974 he returned to the United States and married. He moved to Philadelphia in 1975. In 2004, Bartlett traveled around the world before moving to Seattle, Washington, in 2005.

== Education ==
Bartlett studied at the University of the Arts in Philadelphia, and then the Pennsylvania Academy of Fine Arts. He received a Certificate of Fine Art from PAFA in 1980. During this period, he studied anatomy at the Philadelphia College of Osteopathic Medicine, mirroring the approach of the 19th century realist painter, Thomas Eakins. During his time in Pennsylvania, Bartlett apprenticed under Nelson Shanks. Bartlett then went on to study liberal arts at the University of Pennsylvania from 1980 to 1981. In 1986, Bartlett received a Certificate in Filmmaking from New York University. The influence of film is apparent in Bartlett’s work. Cinematic scale, lighting, and narrative staging are important elements throughout his career.

== Painting career ==
Bartlett is an American realist with a modernist vision. His paintings are inspired by American Realism as defined by artists such as Thomas Eakins, Edward Hopper, Grant Wood, Norman Rockwell, and Andrew Wyeth. He paints in the Grand Manner of academic painting of the 18th and 19th centuries, integrating figure painting, portraiture, landscape, and still life into his scenes.

Following a long legacy of realist painters, Bartlett embarked on his career in the 1970s, at a time when the Art World embraced abstraction, conceptual art, and Minimalism. Bartlett is guided in his work by a quote by Robertson Davies, “Let your root feed your crown.” To Bartlett this means to paint your life, to be true to your temperament in order to maintain truth and originality throughout one’s work.

Bartlett's paintings straddle the line between realism and surrealism. The subjects may be mundane, but painted with a slightly uncanny quality. There is “an oddity about his works that creates psychological pause within the viewer.” His paintings shows the influence of Surrealists such as Rene Magritte, Salvador Dali, and Giorgio de Chirico. Bartlett often creates scenes that are highly improbable, but not entirely impossible.

=== Notable works ===
Lifeboat, oil on linen, 1998.

Young Life, 78 x 108 inches, oil on linen, 1994, private collection on loan to Ogden Museum, New Orleans, LA. Young Life is a play on the painting, American Gothic, by Grant Wood. The scene is depicts a young American family, posing after a successful hunt.

Homeland, 134 x 204 inches, oil on linen, 1994, McCormick Place, Chicago. Homeland references several historical paintings including Washington Crossing the Delaware, The Raft of the Medusa and Liberty Leading the People.

Lifeboat, 80 x 100 inches, oil on linen, 1998, private collection, previously on loan to the Bo Bartlett Center, Columbus State University, Columbus, GA. Lifeboat is inspired by Winslow Homer’s The Fog Warning. The man in the rowboat is dressed casually and the day is bright, yet he is surrounded by threats including a shark in the water and a large crashing wave.

The American, 82 x 100 inches, oil on linen, 2016, Mennello Museum, Orlando, FL.

=== Exhibitions ===
Bartlett has had numerous solo exhibitions nationally and internationally. Solo exhibitions include:

- “Retrospective,” Bo Bartlett Center, Columbus State University, Columbus, GA
- “Paintings from the Outpost,” Dowling Walsh Gallery, Rockland, ME
- “Bo Bartlett: American Artist,” The Mennello Museum of American Art, Orlando, FL and Orlando Museum, Orlando FL
- Miles McEnery Gallery, New York, NY
- Morris Museum of Art, Augusta, GA
- The University of Mississippi Museum, Oxford, MS
- “Paintings of Home,” Ilges Gallery, Columbus State University, Columbus, GA
- “A Survey of Paintings,” W.C. Bradley Co. Museum, Columbus, GA
- “Paintings of Home,” P.P.O.W. Gallery, New York, NY
- “Bo Bartlett,” Ogden Museum of Art, New Orleans, LA
- Frye Art Museum, Seattle, WA
- Pennsylvania Academy of Fine Arts, Philadelphia, PA
- Santa Barbara Museum, Santa Barbara, CA
- Columbus Museum, Columbus, GA
- Greenville County Museum of Art, Greenville, SC

=== Collections ===
- Denver Museum of Art
- Santa Barbara Museum of Art
- Morris Museum of Art
- Mennello Museum of American Art
- Tacoma Art Museum
- Hunter Museum of American Art
- Frye Art Museum
- Crystal Bridges Museum
- Seattle Art Museum
- Pennsylvania Academy of the Fine Arts
- Woodmere Art Museum

== Film career ==
Bartlett’s experience in filmmaking led him to connect with Betsy Wyeth in 1992, to embark upon a film about the life and work of her husband, Andrew Wyeth. The film collaboration marked the beginning of Bartlett's relationship with Wyeth as a lifelong friend. Snow Hill was completed in 1995.Snow Hill received the CINE Golden Eagle Award, the Gold Apple Award from the National Educational Media Network Awards, Best Documentary from Hot Springs DFF, Best Biography from CINDY Awards, and Best Documentary from Philadelphia FVF.

Bartlett went on to co-direct SEE: An Art Road Trip with Betsy Eby. He also directed HELGA, a documentary short about Andrew Wyeth’s muse and model, and Things Don’t Stay Fixed.

=== Things Don't Stay Fixed ===
Things Don’t Stay Fixed is a 2021 American Southern Gothic drama film. It is the first feature film by Bo Bartlett and Betsy Eby. The film tells the story of a worldly photojournalist returning to the Deep South to stop his daughter’s wedding and save her future, only to find that it is he who has been stuck in the past. The film stars William Gregory Lee, Tara Ochs, Brenda Bynum, Desi Evans, and Melissa Saint-Amand.

The film follows photojournalist Sam Grace (William Gregory Lee) as he returns home to the Deep South in an attempt to stop his daughter, Nina (Melissa Saint-Amand), from what he sees as a misguided marriage. Sam’s return home becomes more telling as he discovers that he’s the one that has been stuck in the past all along. There are many parallels between the experiences of Sam Grace and Bo Bartlett's own life. Sam returns to his wife’s family home much in the way Bartlett, and his artist wife Betsy Eby returned to Columbus, Georgia in 2012 to live in Bartlett’s childhood home. “Andrew Wyeth taught me how to be inspired by your own life, by your experiences, and how to get it into the work,” says Bartlett. “At its heart, this is a film about grief, and finding joy and beauty in the midst of it,” says star Melissa Saint-Amand.

Things Don’t Stay Fixed draws inspiration from the Southern Gothic literary works of Tennessee Williams and Carson McCullers. With dreamlike imagery and a painterly stream of consciousness, the film both evokes and bends the Southern genre of films such as Cool Hand Luke, Driving Miss Daisy, and Beasts of the Southern Wild. Bo Bartlett co-wrote the screenplay for Things Don’t Stay Fixed with playwright Sandra Deer in the 1980s, as Bartlett received a Certificate in Filmmaking from NYU’s Tisch School of the Arts. Bartlett and Eby worked as co-directors and producers on the film, as they have on previous documentary projects. The film also features original music by Eby.

Things Don’t Stay Fixed is set and filmed in Bartlett’s native Columbus, Georgia and was done in conjunction with the Georgia Film Academy with an all-Georgia cast. Bartlett said, "To me, there’s nothing worse than having a bunch of Hollywood actors trying to fake Southern accents. So we had all Southern actors.” The film is distributed by Indican Pictures and was released in select theaters on February 12, 2021, and on streaming platforms on February 16, 2021.

=== Filmography ===
Films Directed by Bartlett
Year	Title	Awards	Notes
1986	How to Dispose of a Body Properly		Short
1986	Brighton		Short
1987	Microwave Bleed	Comcast Public Access Award	Short
1990	Night of the Cicada		Short
1994	Kiss the Moon		Short
1995	Snow Hill	Cine Golden Eagle Award	Documentary Feature
2012	SEE: An Art Road Trip		Documentary Feature
2018	HELGA		Documentary Short
2018	Lobster Dinner		Documentary Feature
2021	Things Don't Stay Fixed		Feature

== Awards ==
Bartlett is the recipient of many awards including:

- Distinguished Alumni Award from The Pennsylvania Academy of the Fine Arts, Philadelphia Pennsylvania (2024)
- Honorary Certificate of Fine Arts Degree from Lyme Academy of Art, Lyme Connecticut (2023)
- Honorary Doctorate of Fine Arts Degree from New York Academy of Art (2023)
- The South Arts State Fellowship Award for Georgia (2019)
- Portrait Society of America Excellence in Fine Art Education Award to the Bo Bartlett Center (2019)
- Gibbes Society 1858 Southern Contemporary Art Prize (2017)
- The Brookstone Distinguished Alumni Award (2013)
- The PEW Fellowship in the Arts (1993)
- The Philadelphia Museum of Art Award (1987)
- Eleanor S. Gray Still Life Prize (1980)
- Benjamin Lanard Memorial Award (1980)
- Thouron Prize (1980)
- The William Emlen Cresson Traveling Scholarship, Pennsylvania Academy of Fine Arts, Philadelphia, PA (1980)
- Cecelia Beaux Memorial Portrait Prize, Pennsylvania Academy of Fine Arts, Philadelphia, PA (1979)
- Charles Toppan Prize, Pennsylvania Academy of the Fine Arts, Philadelphia, PA (1978)
- Packard Prize, Pennsylvania Academy of the Fine Arts, Philadelphia, PA (1977)

== Bo Bartlett Center ==
The Bo Bartlett Center opened in January 2018, as part of the Corn Center for Visual Arts at Columbus State University in Columbus, Georgia. The center is an 18,425 square foot interactive gallery space, studio space, and teaching space designed by Tom Kundig.

The Bo Bartlett Center houses more than 300 paintings and drawings as well as the complete archive of sketch books, correspondence, journals, recordings, photographs, artistic notes, memorabilia, objects and objects d’art relevant to the production of Bartlett’s work.

The art collection belonging to Bartlett's sister, Sandy Scarborough, and her husband Otis, known as the Scarborough Collection, makes up a large part of the works on view at the Bo Bartlett Center.

Outreach programs include Art in Jail, a series of drawing and painting classes taught by Bartlett to men incarcerated at the Muscogee County Jail. Painting and drawing classes are also taught to the homeless community through the program, Home is Where the Art is. Artists are provided with materials and are able to sell their work. Annual exhibitions for both programs are held at the Center. Other programs include Art Makes You Smart! taught to schoolchildren, Artistic Ability taught to adults with disabilities, and Kindness Through Art, geared toward children living in homeless shelters.

== Personal life ==
In 1986 Bartlett spent time in Maine, where he befriended the Wyeths. In 1998 Bartlett purchased Wheaton Island, Maine, where he now lives and works every summer. Bartlett married artist Betsy Eby on Wheaton Island in 2007.
