= Carolyn Hugley =

American politician

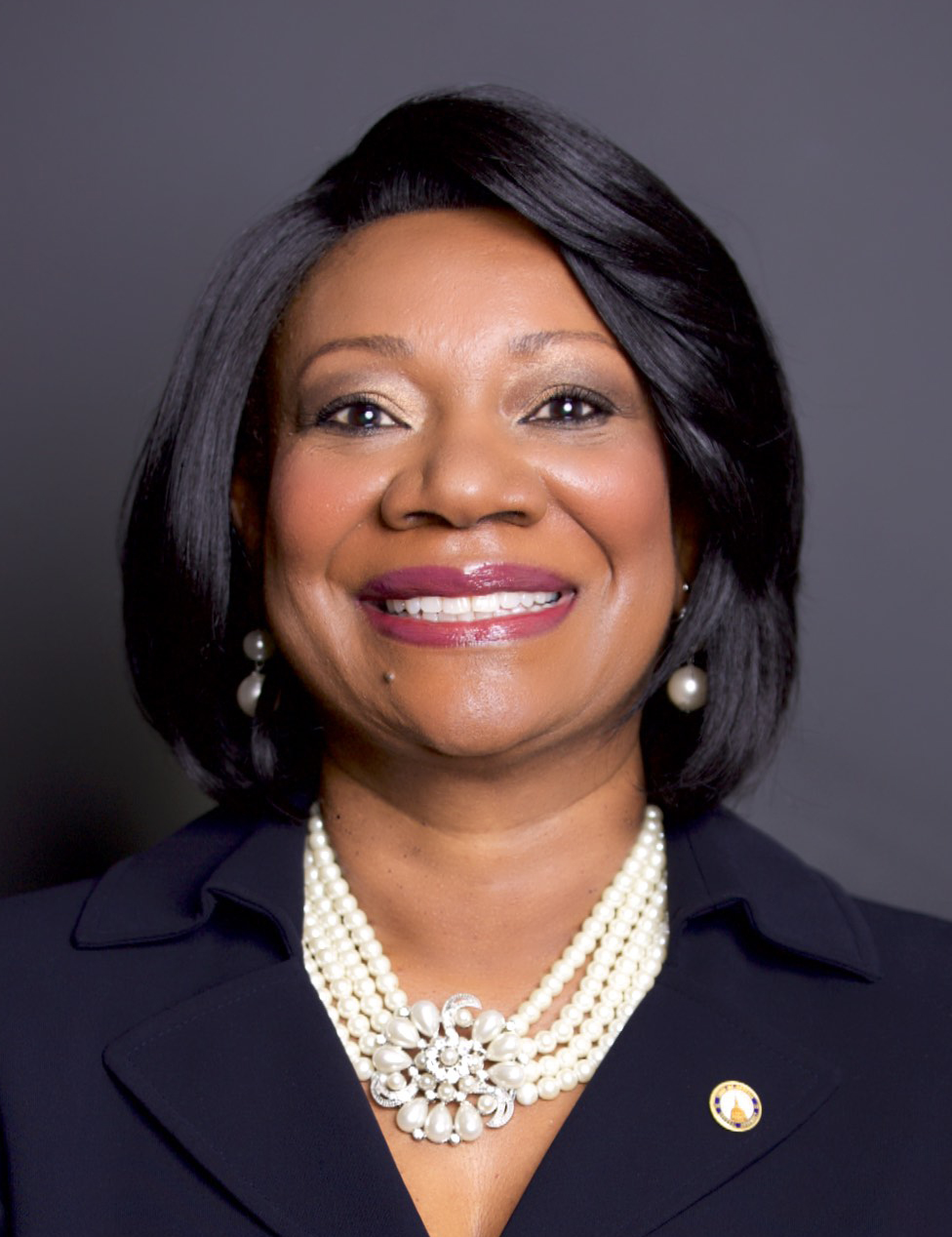
- Official portrait, 2025

Minority Leader of the Georgia House of Representatives
- Incumbent
- Assumed office January 13, 2025
- Preceded by: James Beverly

Member of the Georgia House of Representatives
- Incumbent
- Assumed office January 11, 1993
- Constituency: 133rd district (1993–2003); 113th district (2003–2005); 133rd district (2005–2013); 136th district (2013–2023); 141st district (2023–present)

Personal details
- Born: May 2, 1958 (age 68) Forrest City, Arkansas, U.S.
- Party: Democratic
- Spouse: Isaiah Hugley
- Education: Davidson College (BA); Samford University (JD)
- Website: www.hugleyforgeorgia.com

Carolyn Fleming Hugley (born May 2, 1958) is a Democratic member of the Georgia House of Representatives, representing portions of Columbus since 1992. She has served as House Minority Leader since 2025, and previously served as Democratic Minority Whip from 2003 to 2018.

== Personal life ==
Hugley is an insurance agent. She is married to Isaiah Hugley, who has served as City Manager of Columbus since 2005. They have two children, Kimberly and Isaiah, Jr.

Georgia House of Representatives
Preceded by James Beverly	Minority Leader of the Georgia House of Representatives; 2025–present	Incumbent
