= Betsy Eby =

American painter

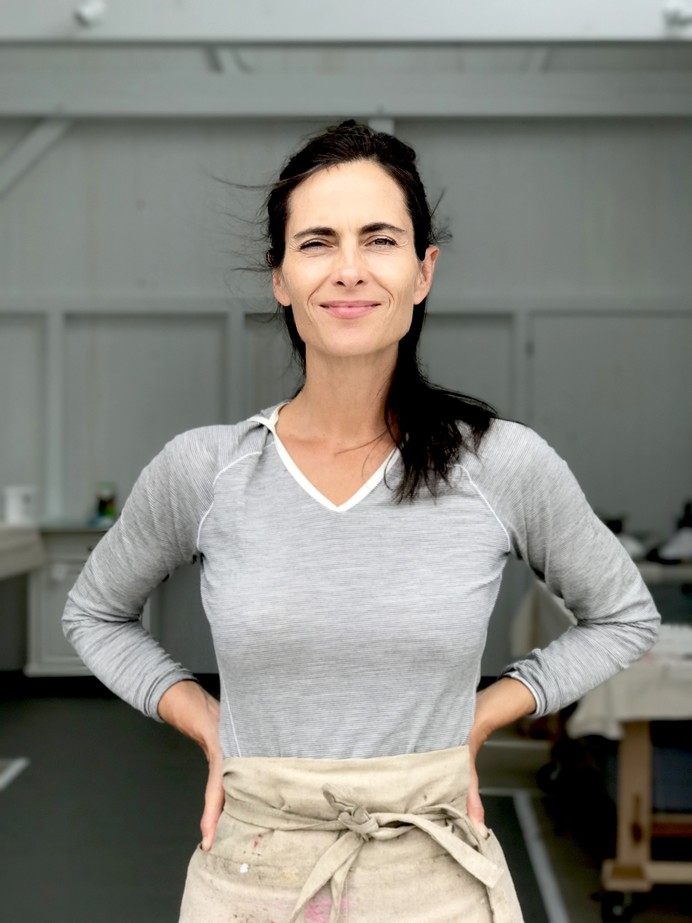
- Born: Elizabeth Kerry Eby; April 3, 1967 (age 59); Seaside, Oregon, United States
- Education: University of Oregon
- Known for: Encaustic painting

Elizabeth Kerry Eby (born April 3, 1967) is an American artist and musician. She lives and works in Columbus, Georgia, and Wheaton Island, Maine.

== Life ==
Eby was born on April 3, 1967, in Seaside, Oregon. In 1972, her family moved to the suburbs of Portland, Oregon. Her father worked in the timber industry, while her mother worked in community college admissions. At the age of five, Eby began playing the piano and studying the traditional classical repertoire. She continues to study under master musicians.

Eby earned her bachelor's degree in art history from the University of Oregon, with an emphasis on ancient Greek, Roman and Asian antiquities. In 1990 she moved to Seattle, Washington, where she lived and worked until 2013, In that year, she and her husband, American artist Bo Bartlett, moved to Columbus, Georgia. They now divide their time between Columbus, Georgia and Wheaton Island, Maine. In 2018, Eby and Bartlett opened the Bo Bartlett Center at Columbus State University. This interactive gallery space aims to engage nearby communities through arts programming.

== Work ==
Betsy Eby primarily works in encaustic, a painting medium composed of hot beeswax, damar resin, and pigments. The encaustic technique dates back to the 4th century B.C., when it was originally used for creating Egyptian mummy funerary portraits. Encaustic was not a common medium for painters until it was revived by Pop artist Jasper Johns in his iconic flag paintings.

In 2018, Betsy Eby was selected to represent the United States as a Cultural Exchange Artist through the U.S. State Department's Art in Embassies program in Papua New Guinea and the Solomon Islands. As a cultural exchange artist, Eby aimed to promote female empowerment through creativity by collaborating with local artists and participating in television and radio interviews.

== Film ==
Betsy Eby is also a film producer and musician for films. In 2013, she and Bo Bartlett released the feature-length documentary film SEE, An Art Road Trip. In 2019, she was executive producer and musician for the feature-length film Things Don’t Stay Fixed, the documentary short film Helga, and the documentary Lobster Dinner.

== Collections & Exhibitions ==
Betsy Eby has exhibited widely across the United States. Her 2013 solo exhibition, “Painting with Fire,” traveled to the Columbus Museum of Art in Columbus, GA; the Morris Museum of Art in Augusta, GA; the Center for Maine Contemporary Art in Rockport, ME; and the Ogden Museum in New Orleans, LA. Eby's works are held in the collections of the Tacoma Art Museum, Tacoma, WA, the Columbus Museum of Art, Columbus, GA, the Georgia Museum of Art, Athens, GA, and several United States Embassies around the world.
