= Columbus State University =

Public university in Columbus, Georgia, US

Coordinates: 32°30′05″N 84°56′32″W

- Former names: Columbus College (1958–1996)
- Motto: Primus inter pares
- Motto in English: First among equals
- Type: Public university
- Established: 1958; 68 years ago
- Parent institution: University System of Georgia
- Academic affiliations: Space-grant
- Endowment: $104.7 million (2025)
- President: Stuart Rayfield
- Provost: Dustin Anderson
- Faculty: 300
- Administrative staff: 495
- Students: 7,610 (fall 2023)
- Undergraduates: 6,008 (fall 2023)
- Postgraduates: 1,602 (fall 2023)
- Location: Columbus, Georgia, US
- Campus: Suburban, 132 acres (Main campus) Urban (RiverPark campus)
- Colors: (Blue and Red)
- Nickname: Cougars
- Sporting affiliations: NCAA Division II – Peach Belt Conference
- Mascot: Cody Cougar
- Website: columbusstate.edu
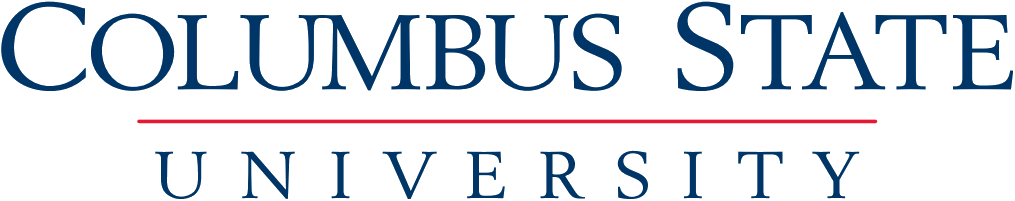

Columbus State University is a public university in Columbus, Georgia, United States. Founded as Columbus College in 1958, the university was established and is administered by the Board of Regents of the University System of Georgia.

== History ==
The university was first called Columbus College when it opened as a junior college in a former hosiery mill in 1958. The college was staffed by fifteen faculty and staff and almost three hundred students attended courses in the first year.

Columbus College relocated to the midtown area in 1963, building a campus defined by modern architecture on what was previously a dairy farm. The school was granted four-year status in 1965 with offerings of bachelor's and master's degrees. The first four-year class graduated in 1970.

In 1996, the school was renamed Columbus State University as part of a program to restructure four-year institutions within the state's university system. The school now offers undergraduate and graduate programs in more than ninety academic disciplines. As of the 2010 academic year, the university enrolled more than 8,200 students. In early 2007, the art and theatre departments moved to the university's newly built RiverPark Campus in downtown Columbus. The complex was designed to provide students of the fine arts with a tightly-knit living community and larger studios, laboratories, and galleries. The Schwob School of Music is housed in the adjacent RiverCenter for the Performing Arts.

The university's first president, Thomas Whitley, served from 1958 to 1979. The T. Y. Whitley Clock Tower on Main Campus is named in his honor. Francis J. Brooke then held the position from 1980-1987. Frank D. Brown was President of Columbus State University from 1988-2008. Prior to holding this office, he was Vice President for Business Affairs. In August 2008, Tim Mescon became president, and in 2015 Chris Markwood became president. After Markwood retired in 2022, John M. Fuchko assumed the role of interim president. During the Summer of 2023, Dr. Stuart Rayfield began her tenure as president, and was inducted on October 20, 2023.

== Campus ==
The T.Y. Whitley Clock Tower on main campus

Columbus State University's 132-acre (53 ha) main campus is located in suburban and downtown, Columbus. A satellite campus is also located on Fort Benning at the southern edge of the city.

=== Main campus ===
CSU's main campus is located in suburban Columbus at the intersection of Interstate 185 and GA-85. This campus houses the majority of the university's academic and athletic departments. Notable buildings include the Simon Schwob Memorial Library, the Center for Commerce and Technology, the D. Abbott Turner College of Business, and the Frank G. Lumpkin Jr. Center which is home to the athletic department.

The Japanese Saturday School of Columbus – Georgia (コロンバス（GA）補習授業校 Koronbasu (GA) Hoshū Jugyō Kō) has its office in the Howard Building at the university, and it conducts its classes at the university. As of 2005 classes are held at the Howard Building.

=== RiverPark campus ===
CSU's RiverPark campus, located near the banks of the Chattahoochee River, is the home of the university's fine and performing arts, communications, and history and geography departments. The downtown campus is housed in a mix of rehabilitated 19th and early 20th century industrial and commercial buildings and newly constructed facilities. The Schwob School of Music is contained in the state of the art RiverCenter for the Performing Arts, while the art and theater departments reside in the Corn Center for the Visual Arts, the Yancey Center at One Arsenal Place, and the Rankin Arts Center. The Department of Communication and the Department of History and Geography are located in the Yancey Center and Dillingham Building. The university continues to expand the RiverPark campus by acquiring new real estate in the area. CSU also houses over 400 students in several halls of residence in downtown Columbus along with dining, campus bookstore, and regular bus service to the main campus. In 2016 the College of Education and Health Professions relocated downtown. This college's new home, Frank Brown Hall, mixes new construction with rehabilitating the 1931 Mediterranean-revival building (the previous location of the Ledger-Enquirer newspaper).

== Academics ==
=== Undergraduate ===
The university recruits from all fifty states as well as every major metropolitan area and county in the state of Georgia. Because of the school's international education programs, presently offering exchanges to more than thirteen countries, the university has been known to be a popular destination for international students including those from India, Japan, South Korea, Germany, and the United Kingdom.

=== Graduate ===
The university has received special recognition for its business school, which offers a reputable MBA program, as well as for its servant leadership program. The Department of Theatre also boasts the only accredited teacher education and certification program in drama in the state of Georgia. Additionally, in 2008 the world renowned Schwob School of Music received the Regents Teaching Excellence Award for Departments and Programs from the University System of Georgia. The Department of History and Geography ended the Master of Arts Program, which had offered tracks in History (general) and History - Race, Ethnicity & Society.

=== Doctorate ===
In 2009, the university added a Doctor of Education in Curriculum and Leadership degree as its first doctoral program.

=== Academic centers and outreach ===
The university operates the Coca-Cola Space Science Center which hosts student and public programs. Its facilities include the Omnisphere Theater (a planetarium) and the Mead Observatory.

The Carson McCullers Center for Writers and Musicians provides regular programs and offers fellowships. It is based in Columbus native author Carson McCullers' childhood home and serves as both a museum and an artist residency. The university also owns the Carson McCullers House in Nyack, New York.

Oxbow Meadows Environmental Learning Center hosts student and public programs. Its facilities include two nature trails, a bee exhibit, a live alligator and other reptiles, various live raptors, a live opossum, and a Native American exhibit. Each month, the center hosts its Second Sunday on the second Sunday of each month which is a special program open to the public at a small fee. Programs include the annual Insectival, Reptile Fest, Natural Holiday Decorations, Hummingbirds, Bees and Honey, and Bats.

The Center for Global Engagement (formerly Center for International Studies) makes use of the Spencer House at Oxford University in the United Kingdom including for the Spencer Oxford Visiting Student Program, a year-long program for students to reap the benefits of the life and scholarship of the University of Oxford.

Pasaquan, an art environment created by Eddie Owens Martin or St. EOM in Buena Vista, Georgia, was recently renovated and reopened in 2016 through the Kohler Foundation and is now operated by the university.

The Columbus State University Archives houses over four hundred manuscript collections, including those of the International Trombone Association, The International Trumpet Guild, and the Institute for the Study of American Cultures. Other special collections include the Spencer Southeastern Map Collection and unique manuscripts related to Southern author Carson McCullers.

=== Rankings ===
Academic rankings

Regional
- U.S. News & World Report: 64

For 2024, U.S. News & World Report ranked Columbus State No.64 out of 136 Regional Universities South, No.30 in Top Public Schools, and No.36 in Best Value Schools.

== Student life ==
Undergraduate demographics as of Fall 2023
Race and ethnicity	Total
White	41%
Black	38%
Hispanic	9%
Two or more races	5%
Asian	3%
Unknown	3%
International student	1%
Economic diversity
Low-income (Note: The percentage of students who received an income-based federal Pell grant intended for low-income students.)	47%
Affluent (Note: The percentage of students who are a part of the American middle class at the bare minimum.)	53%

In addition to co-educational intramural and recreational programs, students participate in more than a hundred chartered student groups, sororities, fraternities, honor societies, club sports, and special-interest clubs.

=== Newspaper ===
The student-run newspaper publication began when the institution opened as Columbus College. At the time, the newspaper was then called "The Saber," referring to the cavalry sword of the college's mascot at the time, the Confederate Rebels. The publication repurposed its name in 2018 to mean "sharp, cutting edge news." The paper officially changed its name to "The Uproar" in 2020, in response to the resurgence of the Black Lives Matter Movement. The new name referred to CSU's current mascot, the cougar, and the "loud and uncomfortable dialogue" sometimes required to make change. The paper is distributed on all Columbus State campuses and throughout the city of Columbus.

=== Athletics ===
Columbus State University, home of Cougar Athletics, has many types of men's and women's athletics, including basketball, baseball, soccer, softball, tennis, golf, and cross country. All sports compete at the NCAA Division II level in the Peach Belt Conference. Rifle competed as an associate member of the Ohio Valley Conference in NCAA Division I until after the 2014–15 school year, when the program was dropped. The Frank G. Lumpkin Jr. Center, a 4,500-seat arena, houses the Cougars.

=== Club sports ===
Club sports at the university formed in 2008 and may represent CSU in intercollegiate competitions. Currently there are 10 club sports offered: bass fishing, co-ed tennis, men's soccer, paintball, martial arts, football, ultimate frisbee, women's soccer, women's volleyball, and wrestling.

=== Greek life ===
Columbus State University currently has 17 Greek organizations for undergraduate students. About five percent of undergraduate men and women are active in CSU's Greek community.

=== Radio ===
The university's Department of Communication operates and programs a student-run radio station, WCUG (FM) 88.5 Cougar Radio.

== Notable alumni ==
- Bob the Drag Queen, American drag performer, winner of season 8 of RuPaul's Drag Race
- Gary C. Cason, former member of the Georgia House of Representatives
- Roderick Cox (conductor), conductor
- Cale Dodds, country music artist
- Marina Savashynskaya Dunbar (2016), Belarusian artist
- Joni Ernst (1995), Republican U.S. Senator from Iowa
- Joseph Gullett, Republican State Representative from Georgia
- Mark Immelman, South African sportscaster and golf coach
- Kolton Ingram, professional baseball player for the Atlanta Braves
- Kathy Love (1994), former president of Savannah Technical College and of Flint River Technical College
- Rick Lowe (1982), artist
- Lisa Marrache, former member of the Maine Senate
- Evan McGill (2014), theater and music producer
- Roger Moore (basketball), former professional basketball player
- Josh Pate (sports commentator), American sports analyst and journalist
- Bobby Peters, Superior Court judge and former mayor of Columbus
- Jason Rogers (baseball), former professional baseball player
- Hugh Royer III, professional golfer
- John T. Sinnott (1971), chair of internal medicine at the University of South Florida College of Medicine
- Vance Smith (1974), member of the Georgia House of Representatives
- John Clarence Stewart, American actor and singer
- Driss Temsamani (2000), managing director at Citigroup
- George N. Turner, former Atlanta Chief of Police
- Jontavious Willis, country blues musician
- Larry Wortzel, former commissioner on the United States-China Economic and Security Review Commission

== See also ==
- List of colleges and universities in Georgia
