= Carmen J. Cavezza =

American Army general

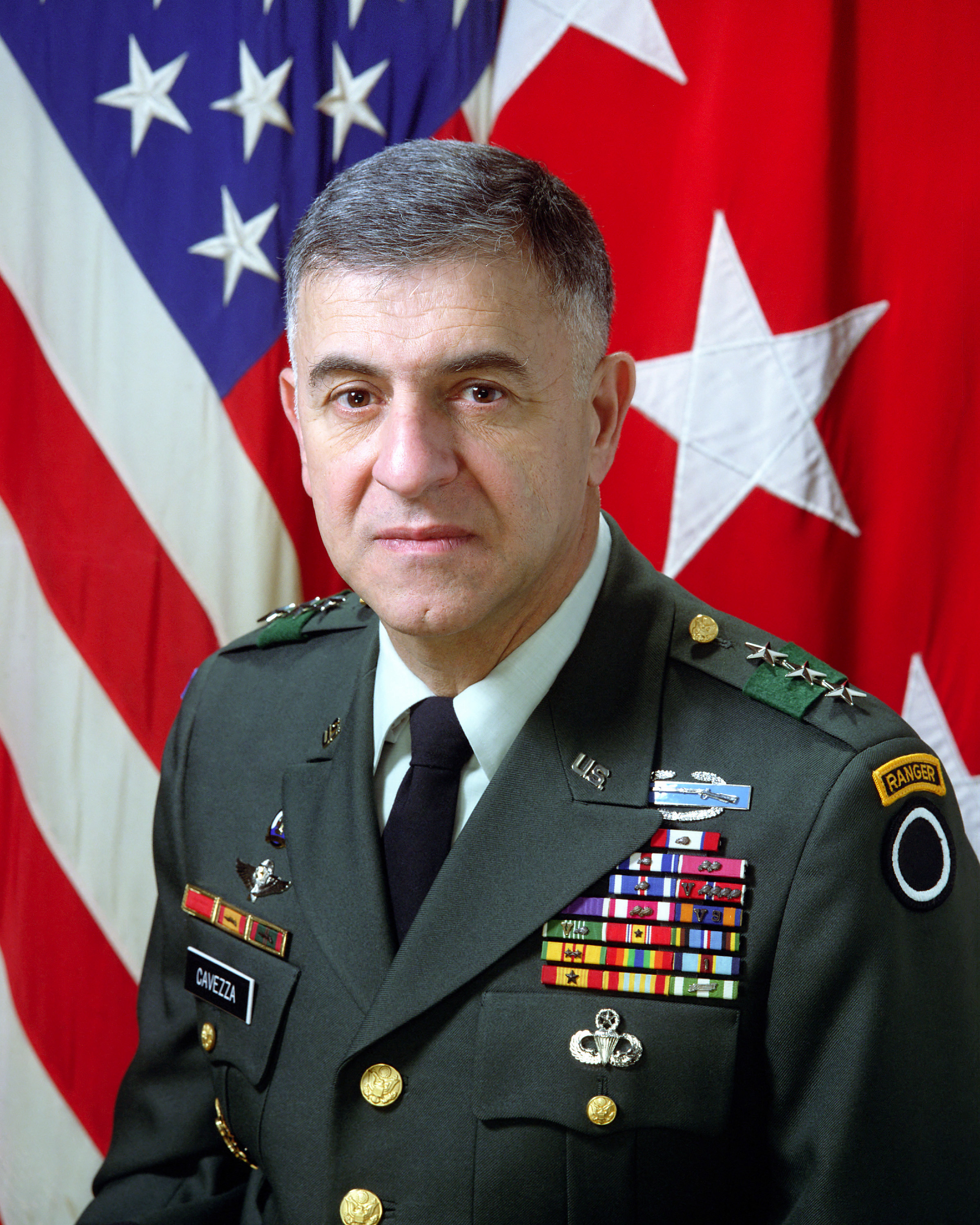
- Born: November 15, 1937 (age 88); Scranton, Pennsylvania, U.S.
- Military career
- Allegiance: United States
- Branch: United States Army
- Service years: 1961–1994
- Rank: Lieutenant General
- Commands: I Corps; United States Army Infantry Center; 7th Infantry Division; 197th Infantry Brigade
- Conflicts: Vietnam War
- Awards: Army Distinguished Service Medal (3); Silver Star (2); Legion of Merit (3); Distinguished Flying Cross (2); Bronze Star Medal (5); Purple Heart; Meritorious Service Medal (3); Air Medal (8)

Carmen James Cavezza (born November 15, 1937) is a retired United States Army lieutenant general. He is a former commander of the I Corps at Fort Lewis, Washington, Commander at Fort Benning, Georgia, Commander at Fort Ord, California, Assistant Commander, 82nd Airborne Division and Commanding General, United States Army Infantry Center and School at Fort Benning, Georgia. Cavezza retired in 1994.

Cavezza attended The Citadel, The Military College of South Carolina, graduating in 1961 with a B.A. degree in political science. He later earned an M.A. degree in government from the University of Miami, an M.S. degree in international affairs from the Elliott School of International Affairs and a Ph.D. degree in political science from George Washington University.

Cavezza was inducted into the U.S. Army Ranger Hall of Fame in 2010.
