= Baker Village (Columbus, Georgia) =

- Neighborhood
- Location within Georgia Location within the United States
- Coordinates: 32°25′29″N 84°56′49″W
- Country: United States
- State: Georgia
- City: Columbus

Population (2007)
  - Total: 1,930
- Time zone: UTC-5 (EST)
  - Summer (DST): UTC-4 (EDT)
- Zip code: 31903

Baker Village is a neighborhood in Columbus, Georgia. It is located southwest of the central business district of Downtown. The apartment complex in this neighbourhood has been demolished and is now the site of the new Arbour Village apartment community which is currently under construction.
