= Kathy Love (academic administrator) =

American academic administrator

Personal details
- Education: Georgia Southwestern State University (BS, MS); Northcentral University (DEd)

Kathy S. Love is an American academic administrator who served as the president of Savannah Technical College from 2009 to 2024 and of Flint River Technical College from 2002 to 2009.

== Biography ==
Love earned a B.S. in computer science and M.S. in business administration from Georgia Southwestern State University. She received a D.Ed. from Northcentral University. In 1994, she completed an education specialist degree from Columbus State University.

In 1986, Love became chair of the computer information services department at South Georgia Technical College. From 1990 to 1994, she was vice president of administrative services. In 1994, she joined Middle Georgia Technical College as its vice president of instructional and student services. She served as the interim president of Central Georgia Technical College. In 2002, Love became president of Flint River Technical College. On January 1, 2009, she became the president of Savannah Technical College. Her tenure ended on March 11, 2024.
