= Hardaway High School =

Public high school in Columbus, Georgia, US

Location
- 2901 College Drive; Columbus, Georgia; United States; 32°29′53″N 84°56′53″W

Information
- School type: Public high school
- Motto: Finimus Coepturi (We finish to begin)
- Established: 1965
- School district: Muscogee County School District
- Principal: Maurdrice McNeill
- Teaching staff: 80.60 (FTE)
- Enrollment: 1,097 (2023–2024)
- Student to teacher ratio: 13.61
- Campus: Urban
- Colors: Scarlet and gold
- Mascot: Golden Hawks
- Newspaper: Hawk Talk
- Website: Hardaway High School

Hardaway High School is located in Columbus, Georgia, United States, in the Muscogee County School District. It is one of 221 schools in the state to offer the International Baccalaureate Diploma Programme and International Baccalaureate Career-related Certificate.

== Academics ==
Celebrating its 50th anniversary in 2017, Hardaway's current enrollment is approximately 1,072 in 2019. The school has a particularly high graduation rate, at 90.3% as of 2016.

The school has enjoyed 13 consecutive years of qualifying for the state academic decathlon, and school teams often rank within the top three.

Students have the choice to complete advanced academic pathways, including a pre-university International Baccalaureate Diploma, International Baccalaureate Career Certificate or an International Skills Diploma. The school also offers a number of languages for students to learn, including: Italian, French, and Spanish.

The school day at Hardaway runs from 8:10 am to 3:25 pm, Monday through Friday. Lunch is divided into five segments of twenty-five minutes each. Hardaway has two long "one-way" hallways. All of the shorter hallways can be traveled in either direction.

== Athletics ==
The Lady Hawks basketball team is currently ranked first in the state. The HHS wrestling team finished 133–0 in the 5A division, which gave them the titles for area, city, and state champions.

The Ledger Enquirer named Hardaway's Athletic Director the Bi-City Coach of the Year..

== School accolades ==
=== 2019 accolades ===
Student wins Georgia Youth Leadership Award.

Georgia Academic Decathlon, 2019 Highest Individual Scores:

- Gold, Honor category, for Brady Hampel.
- Silver, Varsity category, for Timothy Cockcroft.
- Silver, Scholastic category, for David Dzwik

=== 2017 accolades ===
- Academic Decathlon team achieved third place overall in state competition and second place in Division I.
- Student named Exchange Club's Youth of the Year.

=== 2016 accolades ===
- First place US History, third place Student Growth Awards for Algebra.
- The four-year graduation rate was 90.3%.
- Sixteen students earned the International Skills Diploma Seal (ISDS).
- Three students received the Gates Millennium Scholarship.

== Notable alumni ==
- Valerie E. Caproni, judge for the United States District Court for the Southern District of New York
- Marty Jannetty, former professional wrestler
- Wesly Mallard, former NFL player
- Kelcie McCray, former NFL player
- Walter Palmore, UFL player
- Marcus Smith II, former NFL player and Children's author
- Robert Steele, former NFL player
- Mykel Williams, NFL player
