= Osierfield, Georgia =

Unincorporated community in Georgia, U.S.

Coordinates: 31°40′02″N 83°06′58″W

Osierfield is an unincorporated community in Irwin County, in the U.S. state of Georgia.

== History ==
A post office was established at Osierfield in 1901, and remained in operation until 1967. The Georgia General Assembly incorporated Osierfield in 1912. The town's municipal charter was repealed in 1995.
