= Teresa Tomlinson =

American politician (born 1965)

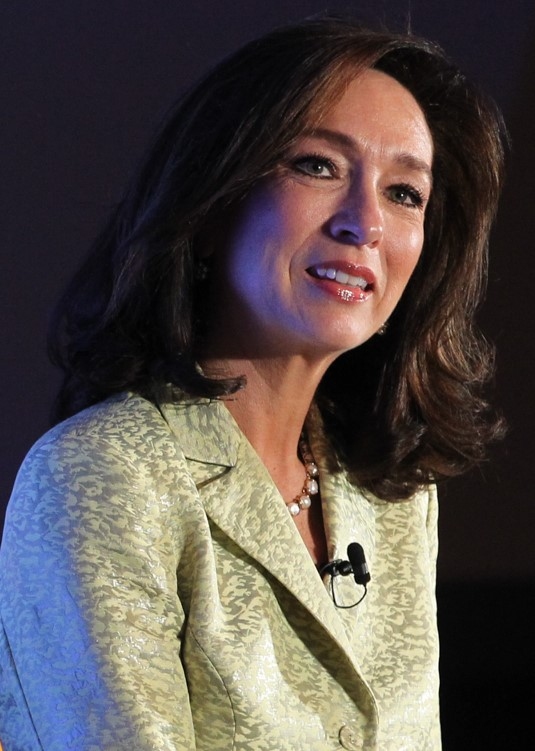
- Tomlinson in 2016

69th Mayor of Columbus
- In office January 3, 2011 – January 9, 2019
- Preceded by: Jim Wetherington
- Succeeded by: Skip Henderson

Personal details
- Born: February 19, 1965 (age 61) Atlanta, Georgia, U.S.
- Party: Democratic
- Spouse: Wade Tomlinson (m. 1997)
- Education: Sweet Briar College (BA); Emory University (JD)

Teresa Pike Tomlinson (born February 19, 1965) is an American politician and attorney. She is a member of the Democratic Party. She was elected and served as the 69th mayor of Columbus, Georgia, in 2010. On January 3, 2011, she was sworn in as the city's first female mayor.

On May 20, 2014, she was re-elected to a second term with 62% of the vote, making her the first mayor since the city's consolidation in 1971 to win re-election in a contested race. She unsuccessfully ran for U.S. Senate against Republican incumbent David Perdue in the 2020 election, losing the Democratic primary to Jon Ossoff.

== Early life and education ==
In 1983, Tomlinson graduated from Chamblee High School. She earned a Bachelor of Arts degree from Sweet Briar College in Virginia and a Juris Doctor from the Emory University School of Law.

== Career ==
=== Legal and philanthropic work ===
In 1991, Tomlinson began her career at the firm Pope, McGlamry, Kilpatrick, Morrison and Norwood as an attorney. In 1998, she became a partner there. She later served as executive director of Midtown, Inc., a Columbus nonprofit focused on community and neighborhood development.

In May 2015, Tomlinson gave the graduation speech at Sweet Briar College, weeks after the college's leadership had voted to close the college. In June 2015, she and others were appointed to the newly configured Sweet Briar Board of Trustees by a settlement agreement approved by the Bedford County, Virginia Circuit Court. Tomlinson was elected chair of the board, and served in that position until July 2018, helping to restructure the college.

On January 7, 2019, Tomlinson joined the law firm Hall Booth Smith, P.C., as a partner specializing in complex litigation, crisis management, and strategic solutions.

On February 8, 2024, she was lead trial counsel for plaintiff Christina Necole Vazquez Klecha, who received a jury award of $20.7 million for the wrongful death of her father, George ("Bick") Hale Bickerstaff, III.

Tomlinson has also handled appellate litigation before the Oklahoma Supreme Court involving COVID-19 liability statutes. In Franklin v. OU Medicine, Inc., 582 P.3d 1127 (Okla. 2025), she represented OU Medicine in a decision resolving several issues of first impression under the federal Public Readiness and Emergency Preparedness Act (PREP Act); the court held that the defendants were entitled to PREP Act immunity and affirmed dismissal of the claims. In Burgess v. Integris Health Edmond, Inc., 2026 OK 54, 2026 WL 1876429, she represented Dr. Bret Langerman and Emergency Services of Oklahoma, P.C.; the court reversed a medical-negligence judgment and held that the providers were immune from ordinary-negligence liability under Oklahoma's COVID-19 Public Health Emergency Limited Liability Act.

== Political career ==
During Tomlinson's tenure as mayor, Columbus was named one of the top fifty Best-Run Cities in America in 2016 and 2017. Her administration saw a 39.3%reduction in crime from its height in 2009, including a 41.2% drop in property crime and a 15% drop in violent crime. Under her leadership, the Columbus Consolidated Government balanced the budget for the first time in 16 years, using no reserve funds, and provided city and county services at the cost of $1,300 per person. Tomlinson instituted reform in the city's pension plan, increasing funding of the General Government plan to over 90%, while preserving the Defined Benefit Plan for Employees.

She also instituted reform at the Muscogee County Prison with the Rapid Resolution Initiative, which expedited the disposition of unindicted inmates at the Muscogee County Jail. Tax Allocation Districts were adopted to encourage the revitalization of city districts, including City Village and the Liberty District. New biking/walking trails were constructed, known as the Dragonfly Trails, to create 60 miles of connected trails throughout the city, including trails and streetscapes in previously blighted areas. Over two miles of the Chattahoochee River were returned to its natural state, creating the world's longest Whitewater Course in an urban setting. Tomlinson has overseen the renaissance of the city's downtown, creating a dining and entertainment district known as Uptown.

Tomlinson has written opinion pieces for The Daily Beast and The Atlanta Journal-Constitution.

She completed her second term on January 6, 2019.

=== 2020 U.S. Senate campaign ===
Tomlinson ran in the Democratic primary to challenge incumbent Senator David Perdue in the 2020 election, but lost to Jon Ossoff, who later won the runoff election against Perdue.

== Personal life ==
Tomlinson moved from Atlanta to Columbus in 1994, and married Wade "Trip" Tomlinson, who was raised in Columbus.

Since leaving office, she has been a partner at the law firm of Hall Booth Smith, PC.
