= Muscogee County School District =

School district in Georgia (U.S. state)

Address
- 2960 Macon Road Columbus, Georgia, 31906; United States
- Coordinates: 32.477177°N 84.947696°W

District information
- Grades: Pre-kindergarten – 12
- Superintendent: David Lewis
- Accreditations: Southern Association of Colleges and Schools; Georgia Accrediting Commission

Students and staff
- Enrollment: 29,818 (2022–23)
- Faculty: 2,006.00 (FTE)
- Student–teacher ratio: 14.86

Other information
- Telephone: (706) 748-2000
- Website: muscogee.k12.ga.us

The Muscogee County School District (MCSD) is the county government agency which operates the public schools in Muscogee County, Georgia.

The district serves as the designated school district all parts of the county, except Fort Benning, for grades K-12. Fort Benning children are zoned to Department of Defense Education Activity (DoDEA) schools for grades K-8. However high school students attend the public high schools in the respective counties they are located in. Any Fort Benning pupil, however, may attend Muscogee County schools if their parents wish, as per House Bill 224. The district does not give transportation to HB224 transfers.

== History ==
=== Integration ===
In 1963, the district formed a special committee on desegregation. In September of that year, the school board approved a freedom of choice plan which would integrate one grade each year. In January 1964, the NAACP filed a lawsuit Lockett v. the Board of Education of Muscogee School District asserting that even with the choice plan, the district maintained an inferior school system for negroes. Superintendent Dr. William Henry Shaw testified that segregation was a "long and universal custom" and that abandoning it would "injure the feelings and physical well-being of the children." Nevertheless, in September 1968, the MCSD ruled that all grades were to be integrated through Freedom of Choice. When the federal court case U. S. v. Jefferson County Board of Education ruled that teaching staffs must also be integrated, the district agreed to assign at least two teachers who would be in the racial minority to the faculty of every school. Both teachers and students considered the goal of this time period to be more focused on survival than on education. By 1970, under the freedom of choice plan, 27 of 67 schools in the district remained completely segregated. At this time, while most of the white schools employed only the mandated two black teachers, but some of the black schools employed more white teachers. Under the threat of a cutoff of $1.8 million in federal funds, the school district integrated the schools in 1971, resulting in a 70% white student population at each school. Various changes were made to appease the different groups: for example, pictures of George Washington Carver were removed from Carver High School to soothe white students. In 1997 federal jurisdiction over the school district ended.

== Board of education ==
The Muscogee County Board of Education is the school district's elected governing body, and consists of nine members elected to staggered four-year terms. Eight of the members are elected from districts; one is elected at large. The Board of Education meets on the second and third Monday of each month unless the schedule is interrupted for a holiday.

=== Board Members ===
- (District 1) Pat Hugley-Green

Term ends 12-31-2024

- (District 2) Nicky Tillery

Term ends 12-31- 2026

- (District 3) Vanessa Jackson

Term ends 12-31-2024

- (District 4) Naomi Buckner

Term ends 12-31-2026

- (District 5) Laurie C.McCray

Term ends 12-31-2024

- (District 6) Mark Cantrell

Term ends 12-31-2026

- (District 7) Cathy Williams

Term ends 12-31-2024

- (District 8) Margot Schley

Term ends 12-31-2026

- (At Large) Kia Chambers

Term ends 12-31-2026

=== Elementary schools (Pre K–5 ) ===
- Allen Elementary School
- Blanchard Elementary School
- Brewer Elementary School
- Britt David Elementary School
- Clubview Elementary School
- Davis Elementary School
- Dimon Elementary School
- Double Churches Elementary School
- Dorothy Height Elementary School
- Downtown Elementary School
- Eagle Ridge Academy School
- Edgewood Elementary School
- Forrest Road Elementary School
- Fox Elementary School
- Gentian Elementary School
- Georgetown Elementary School
- Hannan Elementary School
- Johnson Elementary School
- Key Elementary School
- Martin Luther King Jr. Elementary School
- Mary A. Buckner Academy
- Lonnie Jackson Academy
- Mathews Elementary School
- Midland Academy
- North Columbus Elementary School
- Reese Road Elementary School
- Rigdon Road Elementary School
- River Road Elementary School
- South Columbus Elementary School
- Waddell Elementary School
- Wesley Heights Elementary School
- Wynnton Elementary School

=== Middle schools (6–8) ===
- Aaron Cohn Middle School
- Arnold Magnet Academy
- Baker Middle School
- Blackmon Road Middle School
- Double Churches Middle School
- East Columbus Magnet Academy
- Eddy Middle School
- Fort Middle School
- Midland Middle School
- Rainey-McCullers School of the Arts
- Richards Middle School
- Rothschild Leadership Academy
- Veterans Memorial Middle School

=== High schools (9–12) ===
Jordan Vocational High School

- Columbus High School
- George Washington Carver High School
- Hardaway High School
- Jordan Vocational High School College and Career Academy
- Kendrick High School
- Northside High School
- Rainey-McCullers School of the Arts
- Shaw High School
- Spencer High School

=== Young Adult Education School ===
- Young Adult Education
