= Russell County High School =

Coordinates: 32.3337°N 85.1502°W

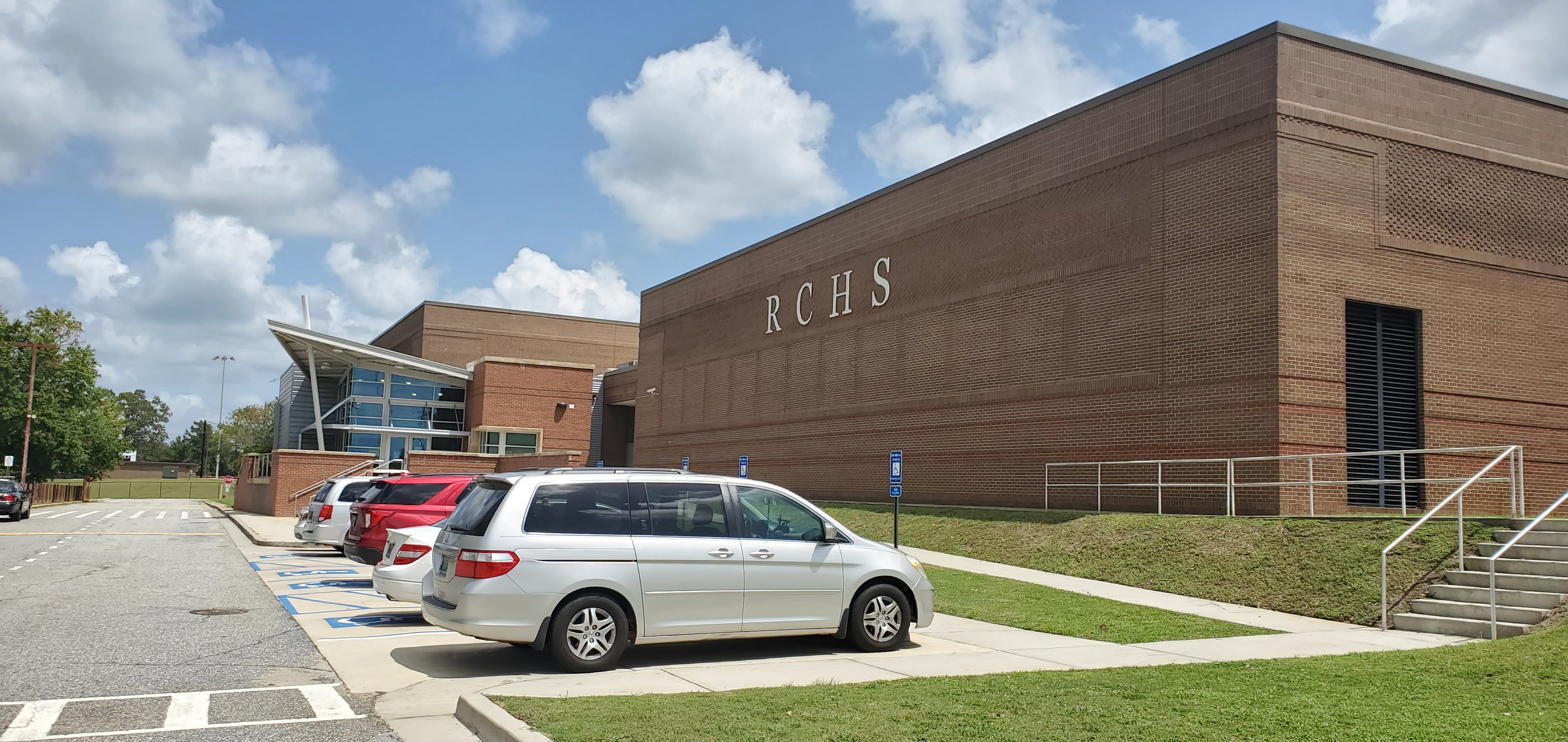

Location
- 4699 Old Seale Highway; Seale, Russell County, Alabama 36875; United States

Information
- Former name: Chavala High School
- School type: Public school
- Motto: "Respectful, Responsible, and Ready for Life"
- School board: Russell County Board of Education
- School district: Russell County School District
- Superintendent: Brenda Coley
- CEEB code: 012400
- Principal: Christopher Daniel
- Teaching staff: 58.00 (FTE)
- Grades: 9-12
- Enrollment: 1,078 (2024–2025)
- Student to teacher ratio: 18.59
- Colors: Maroon and gold
- Sports: Football, baseball, volleyball, softball, soccer, bass fishing, Esports, basketball, flag football
- Mascot: Warrior
- Rival: Smiths Station Panthers
- Website: rchs.myrcsd.org

Russell County High School (RCHS) is a rural Title I public high school located in Seale, Alabama, United States, offering grades 9 through 12. The school enrolls 1,004 students in total (as of the 2021–2022 school year) and is the only high school in the Russell County School District. The student body consists of 43% Caucasian, 47% African American, and 10% other ethnicities.

== History ==
Russell County High School was named Chavala High School before changing its name in 1989. Its previous team nickname was the Chavala High Wildcats before changing their name to the Warriors. Chavala High School's first held school year is believed to have been 1924–1925. The current high school facility is a rebuilt version of the former Chavala High School. The current version was built in 1989 (as published inside of the facility's office), the same year the school changed its name. With the establishment of the neighboring high school, Central High School of Phenix City, RCHS is one of two public high schools in Russell County.

Enrollment grew from 179 students to 651 between 1986 and 1989. Russell County's peak enrollment was 1,004 during the 2022–2023 school year. The lowest enrollment was 179, during the 1986–1987 school year. Since 2006, the school has had an average student enrollment of 750. In the 2018–2019 school year, Russell County High School ranked 73rd among Alabama high schools.

Russell County High School and the district itself have had a diverse community since integration. The school prides itself on its diversity claiming the student population is 47% African American, 43% Caucasian and 10% other.

== Academics ==
Russell County High School is a Title I high school, meaning it receives federal funding.

Niche gives Russell County High School a C+ in academics. For state test scores, RCHS scores a low 42% in reading proficiency. (The percentage is students who scored at or above average on their state testing scores.) In math proficiency, the school scored 37%.

Since RCHS offers college prep courses (AP/Pre-AP), they are graded on the proficiency for the students in those advanced classes. The number of students who are enrolled in AP classes is 1% of the student body. The number of students in RCHS enrolled in AP Math and/or AP Science is below 1%.

The average SAT score for Russell County is 840, which is below the state average of 1127. For SAT Math, the average score is 410, and Verbal is 430. The average ACT score for Math is 20, which is below the state average of 27.1. The average ACT score for Reading is 23, which is also below the state average of 27.4. The average ACT score for English is 23, which is below the state average of 28.3. The average ACT score for Science is 21, which is also below the state average of 27.3. Overall, Russell County High School's average ACT score is 22, which is below the state average of 27.4.

Russell County High School offers free tutoring services. The administration has also implemented ACT preparatory classes and opportunities if students wish to enhance their ACT scores. Russell County High School has implemented a fail safe for students who have failed classes and are in danger of repeating a grade. RCHS uses PLATO, an online credit recovery program, in order for students to get the required credit for the class they did not pass.

== Athletics ==
Russell County High School offers a wide variety of different sports to participate in. These include baseball, football, softball, volleyball, boys' and girls' basketball, cheerleading, dance, boys' and girls' soccer, track & field, and wrestling. Over the 2020–2021 summer vacation, RCHS introduced new sports that were sanctioned by the AHSAA.

The school's teams are the Russell County High School Warriors, and for sports associated with girls, the Lady Warriors. The Warriors' colors are cardinal red and Vegas gold, and the teamsoperate under the Alabama AHSAA 6A Division, Region 2. Russell County's colors and some of their logos resemble those of the Florida State Seminoles.

In almost every sport, Russell County High School has rivalries. The Warriors' biggest rivals are the Smiths Station Panthers in Smiths Station, Alabama. The Warriors and Panthers have met many times across the years in many different sports. Other rivalries are the Opelika Bulldogs from Opelika, Alabama and Eufaula Tigers from Eufaula, Alabama.

=== Football ===
Russell County's football team currently plays in the 6A Region 2 division for AHSAA football. Their overall record as a program is 208-463-5 with a 31% winning percentage. The Warriors' overall region record is 47-194 with one region title (1998). The Warriors do not have any State Titles. Russell County has made the playoffs four times in school history, in 1991, 1998, 2001, and 2013. They possess a 2-4 record in the playoffs.

=== Basketball ===
Russell County's basketball program is one of two sports that has Russell County on the map. The Warriors won a state title for basketball when they were in the 2A division in 1983. They went 25-10 that season. Russell County has 12 Region Championships, in 1973, 1975, 1978, 1982, 1983, 1987, 1988, 1997, 2011, 2014, 2018, and 2020. The Warriors also have six tournament appearances: 1973, 1975, 183, 1983, 1988, and 1997, with a 5-6 overall record.

=== Baseball ===
The Warriors baseball team has historically been good. In 2005, Russell County claimed their one and only baseball state title in the 5A division. They were crowned National Champs by the National High School Baseball Coaches Association after being ranked number one with a 38-1 record. The Warriors have 17 area championships in baseball: 1982, 1983, 2001, 2002, 2003, 2004, 2005, 2006, 2007, 2008, 2009, 2010, 2011, 2012, 2013, 2018, and 2019.

== Clubs and programs ==
Russell County High School offers a variety of clubs, classes, and programs, ranging from JROTC to the newly created African American Studies. Some of these classes have strict requirements, while others are more free and less limited.

=== JROTC/ROTC ===
The Junior Reserve Officer Training Corps program at Russell County High School is a military-style program that teaches students grades 9 through 12 the principles and responsibilities of being a strong American citizen. Students are taught how to correctly stand in formation, march, and sound off, similarly to how trainees are taught in basic training. Everyone is taught the core values of being an American citizen as well as respect, and how to take responsibility for their actions.

=== RCHS Warrior Band ===
The Russell County High School Warrior Band is the primary band associated with RCHS. It is broken up into three sections: Marching Band, Jazz Band, and Symphonic Band. This group is responsible for football halftime performances, band concerts, playing in pep rallies, and band competitions.

The colors for the RCHS Warrior Band are the same as for the school. They wear a uniform of mostly white on the right side, a shoulder of cardinal red, and a Vegas gold diagonal stripe down the middle.

=== National Honor Society ===
Russell County High School offers an exclusive club called the National Honor Society (NHS). This group is filled with a select few students who exceed expectations at RCHS. Students may be chosen or apply, but must meet certain expectations and requirements to get accepted by a teacher or approved faculty member. Russell County High School has a National Honor Society Induction Ceremony every year where they welcome new members of the student population to their exclusive organization.

The NHS is responsible for greeting new students at arrival, and introducing elementary and middle school kids to the high school. Sometimes, these students are sent on trips to represent Russell County High School in certain events.

=== Future Business Leaders of America ===
The Future Business Leaders of America class is a business club offered by RCHS. In this club, students are able to go more in-depth into the life of business, programming, operations, and business finances. Students in this class can compete with other schools across the state or country in complex business competitions. Students who participate in FBLA are prepared for a career in business. They are also taught how to properly run a business and keep one stable. Leadership is a main point that is constantly taught to students, so when they leave and pass the class, they know how to be a proper leader.

FBLA prepares students for multiple career pathways other than business. They also have experiences in order to join the military or choose another career pathway that better suits them. The FBLA class at Russell County High School prepares students for the world of business and gives them experiences for other career pathways so they are best suited for life after graduation.

== Notable alumni ==
- Colby Rasmus, Major League Baseball outfielder for the Tampa Bay Rays
- Cory Rasmus, Major League Baseball relief pitcher for the Atlanta Braves and Los Angeles Angels
