= 2006 Major League Baseball draft =

Baseball draft of amateur players

General information
- Date: June 6–7, 2006
- Location: Conference call
- Network: None

Overview
- 1502 total selections
- First selection: Luke Hochevar; Kansas City Royals
- First round selections: 44

The 2006 Major League Baseball draft, was held on June 6 and 7. It was conducted via conference call with representatives from each of the league's 30 teams.

== First round selections ==
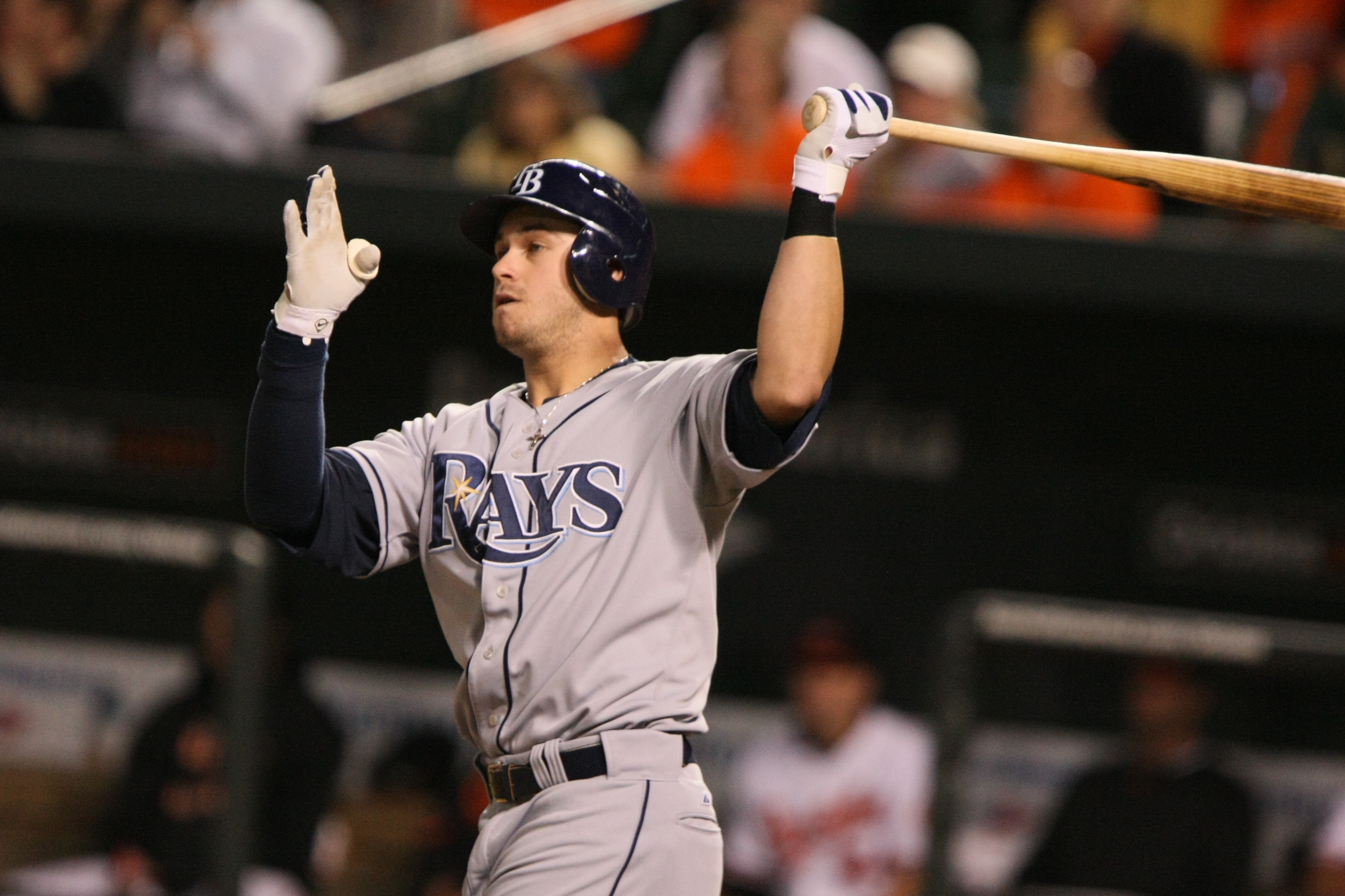
Tampa Bay selected Evan Longoria third overall. The 3× All-Star won the 2008 A.L. Rookie of the Year Award, three Gold Glove Awards at third base, and the 2009 Silver Slugger for third base.

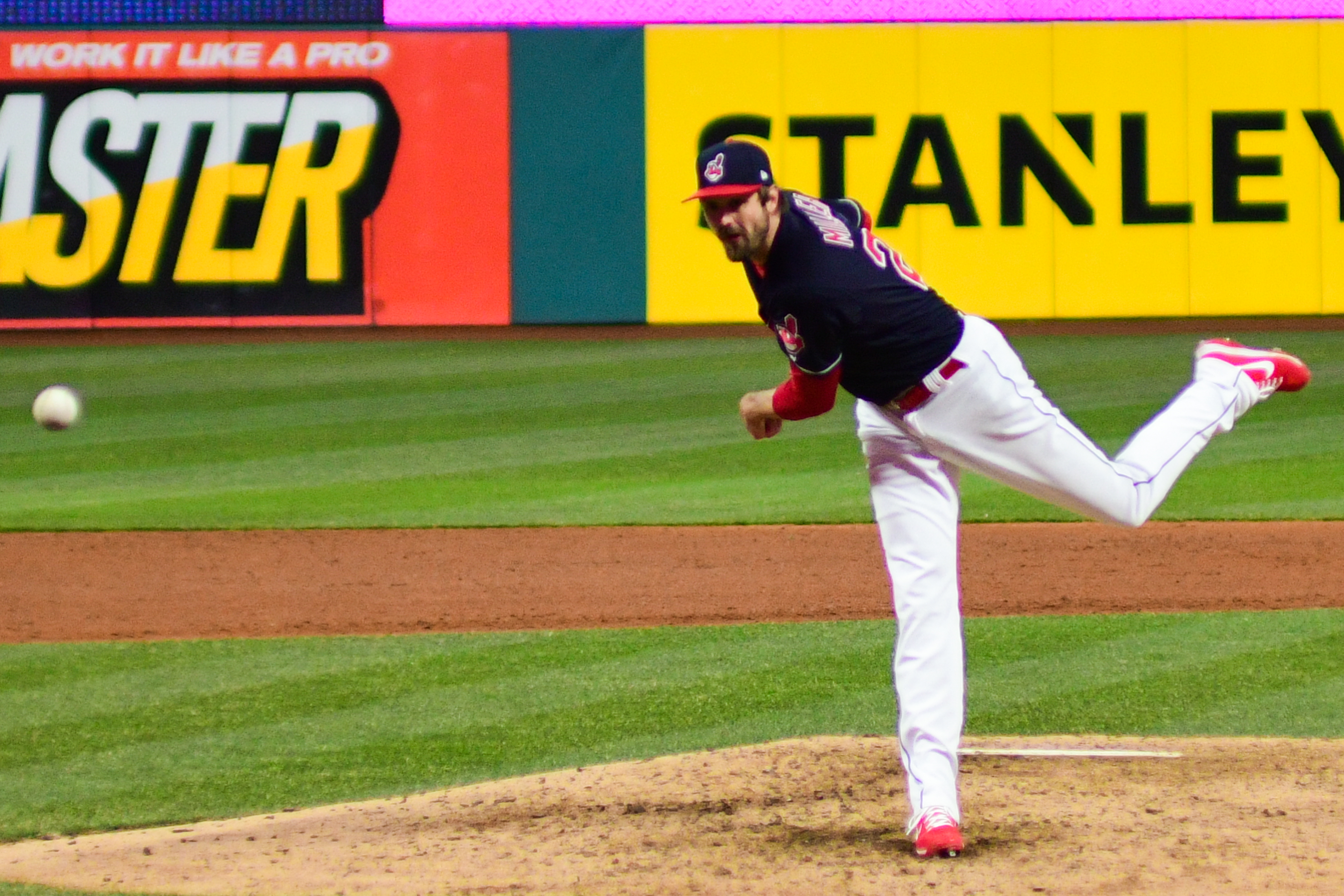
Detroit selected Andrew Miller 6th overall. Miller is a 2× All-Star and the 2015 Reliever of the Year.

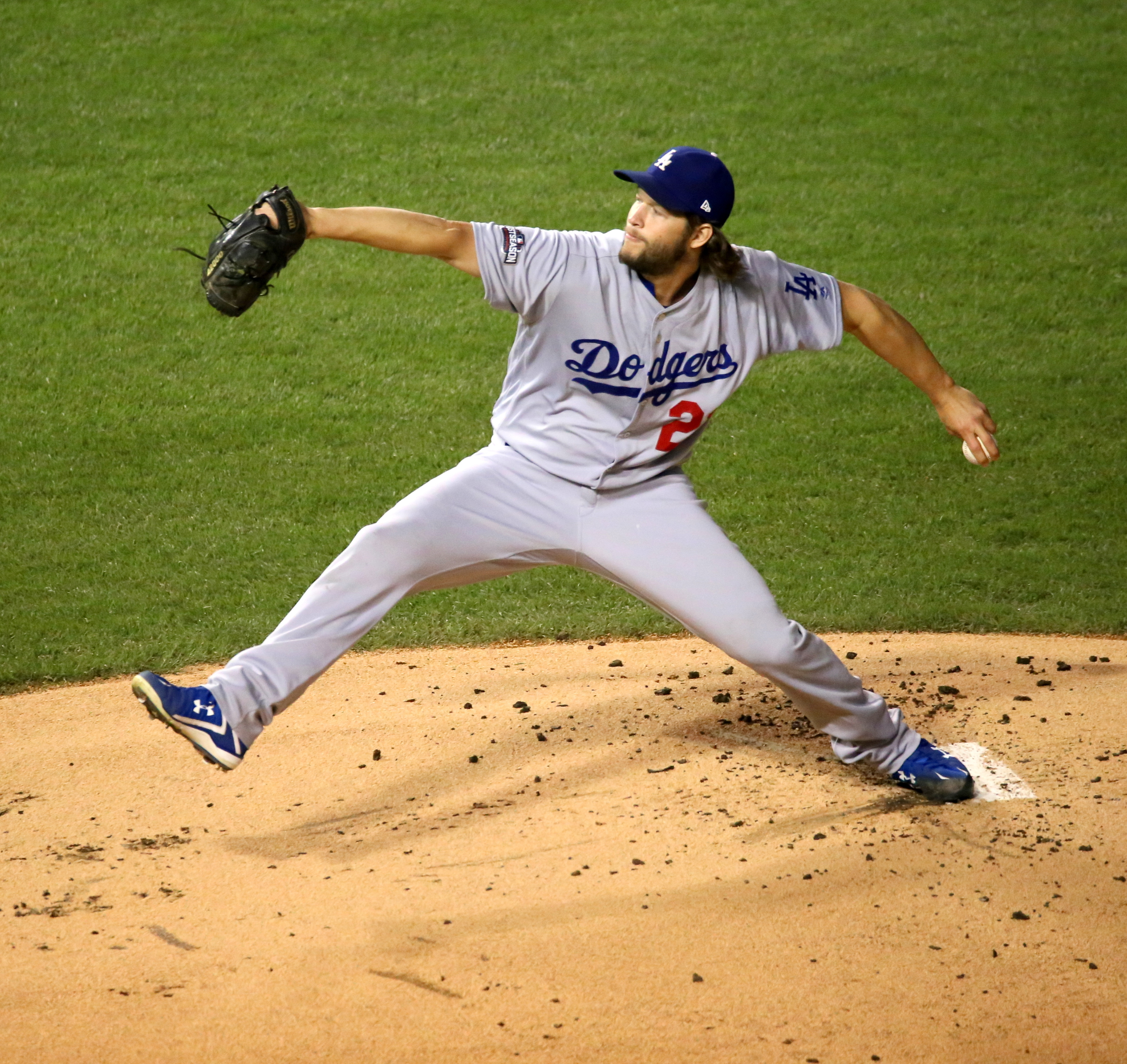
The Los Angeles Dodgers selected Clayton Kershaw seventh overall. A 11× All-Star, Kershaw won three Cy Young Awards, and the 2014 N.L. MVP award.

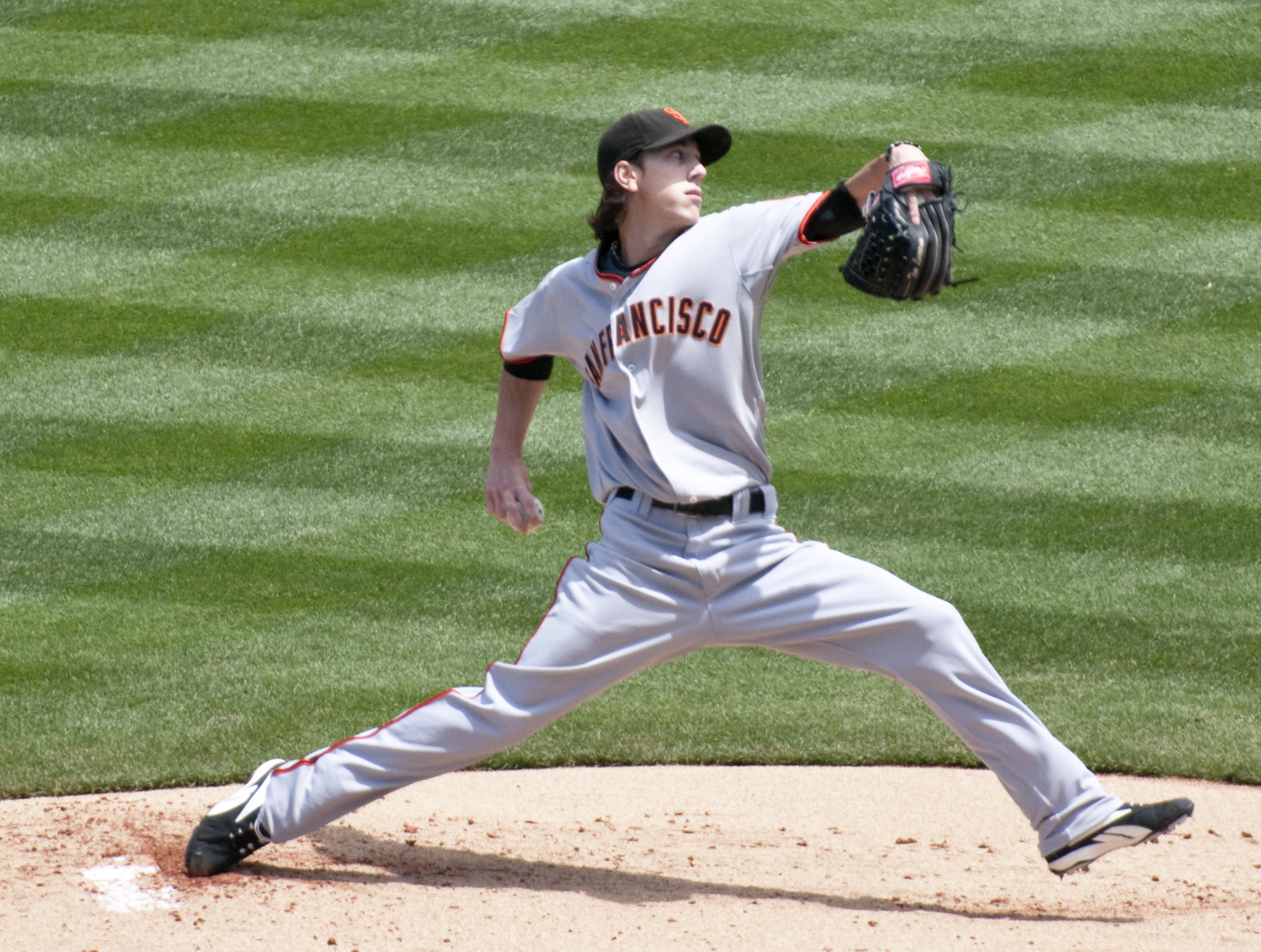
The San Francisco Giants selected Tim Lincecum 10th overall. A 4× All-Star, Lincecum is a 3× league leader in strikeouts and won 2 Cy Young Awards.

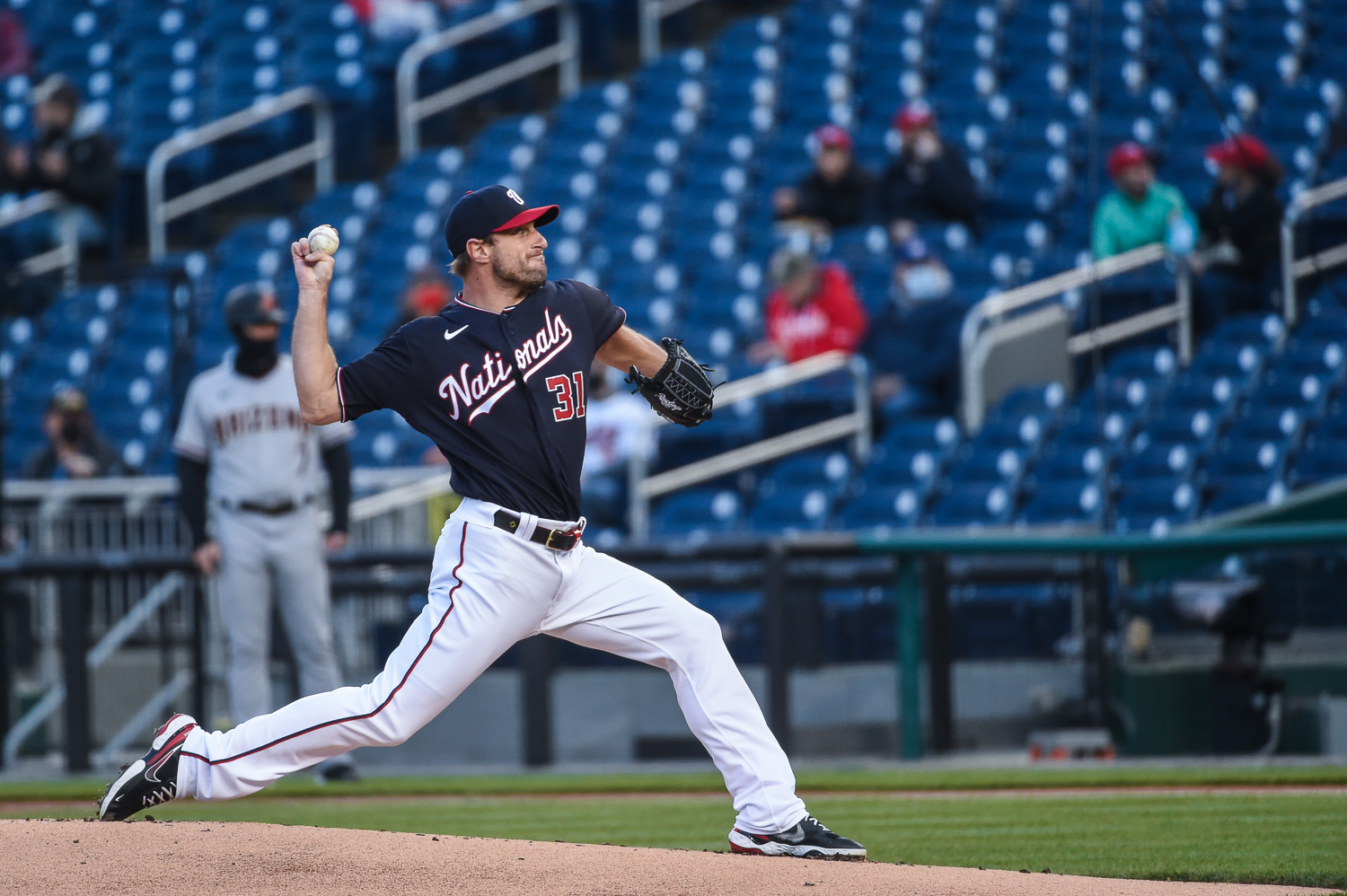
The Arizona Diamondbacks selected Max Scherzer 11th overall. An 8× All-Star, Scherzer won 3 Cy Young Awards and is a member of the 3,000 strikeout club, having the led the league in strikeouts on 3 occasions.

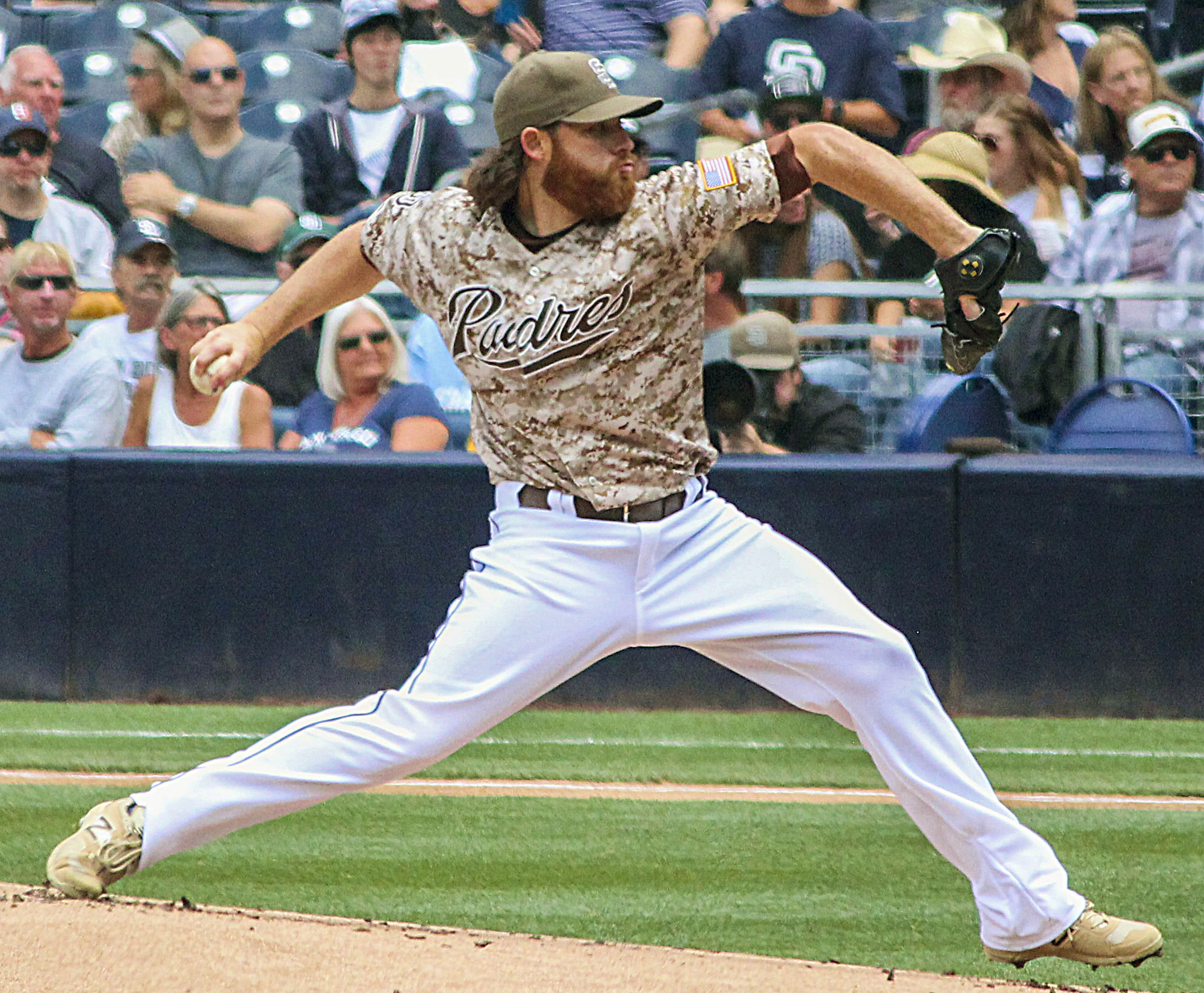
New York Yankees selected Ian Kennedy 21st overall. He led the NL in wins in 2011.

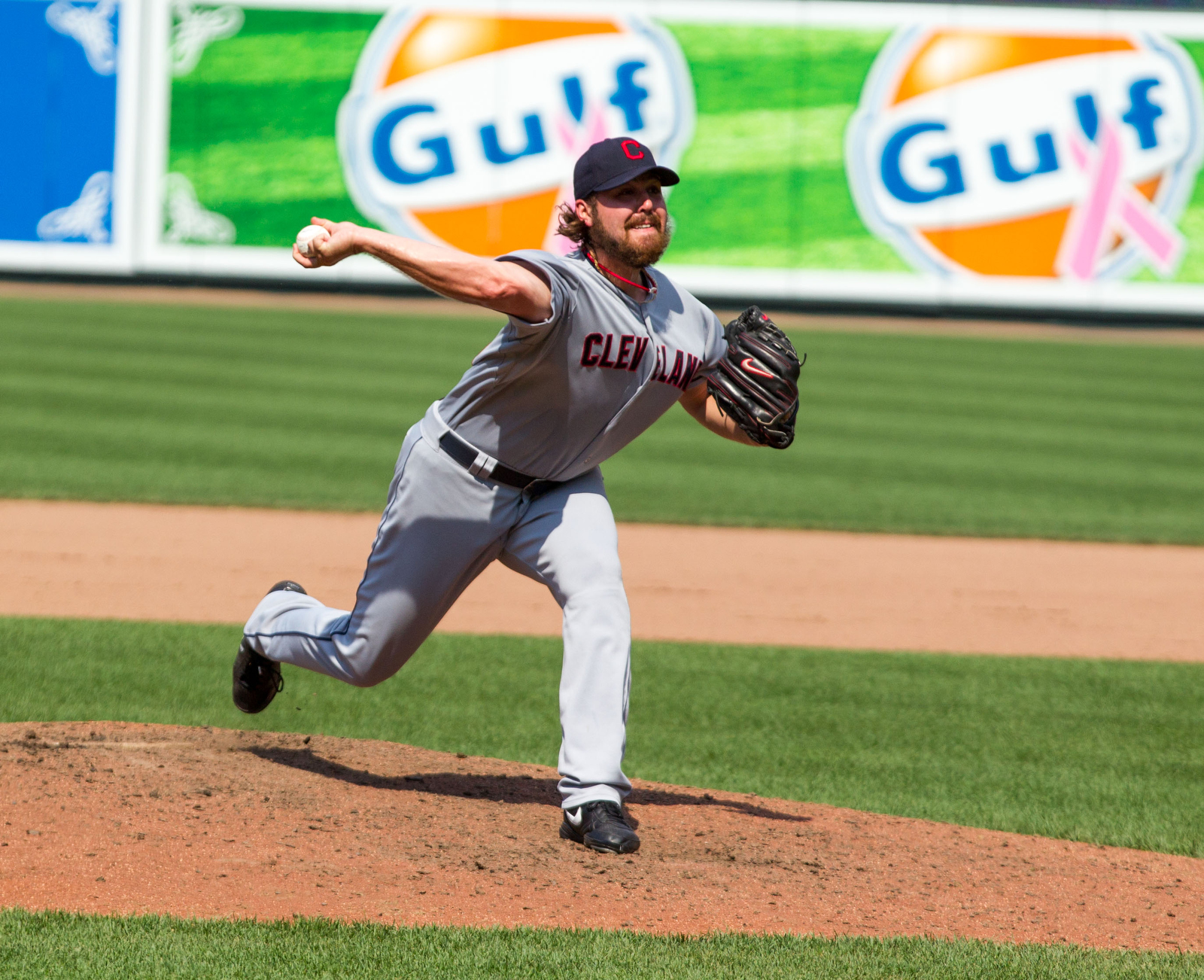
St. Louis selected Chris Perez 42nd overall. He is a 2× All-Star.

Key
All-Star

Pick	Player	Team	Position	School
1	Luke Hochevar	Kansas City Royals	RHP	Tennessee
2	Greg Reynolds	Colorado Rockies	RHP	Stanford
3	Evan Longoria	Tampa Bay Devil Rays	3B	Long Beach State
4	Brad Lincoln	Pittsburgh Pirates	RHP	Houston
5	Brandon Morrow	Seattle Mariners	RHP	California
6	Andrew Miller	Detroit Tigers	LHP	North Carolina
7	Clayton Kershaw	Los Angeles Dodgers	LHP	Highland Park High School (TX)
8	Drew Stubbs	Cincinnati Reds	CF	Texas
9	Bill Rowell	Baltimore Orioles	3B	Bishop Eustace Preparatory School (NJ)
10	Tim Lincecum	San Francisco Giants	RHP	Washington
11	Max Scherzer	Arizona Diamondbacks	RHP	Missouri
12	Kasey Kiker	Texas Rangers	LHP	Russell County High School (AL)
13	Tyler Colvin	Chicago Cubs	LF	Clemson
14	Travis Snider	Toronto Blue Jays	RF	Henry M. Jackson High School (WA)
15	Chris Marrero	Washington Nationals	3B	Monsignor Edward Pace High School (FL)
16	Jeremy Jeffress	Milwaukee Brewers	RHP	Halifax County High School (VA)
17	Matt Antonelli	San Diego Padres	3B	Wake Forest
18	Kyle Drabek	Philadelphia Phillies (Note: Pick from New York Mets as compensation for signing of free agent Billy Wagner)	RHP	The Woodlands High School (TX)
19	Brett Sinkbeil	Florida Marlins	RHP	Missouri State
20	Chris Parmelee	Minnesota Twins	RF	Chino Hills High School (CA)
21	Ian Kennedy	New York Yankees (Note: Pick from Philadelphia Phillies as compensation for signing of free agent Tom Gordon)	RHP	USC
22	Colton Willems	Washington Nationals (Note: Pick from Oakland Athletics as compensation for signing of free agent Esteban Loaiza)	RHP	John Carroll Catholic High School (FL)
23	Maxwell Sapp	Houston Astros	C	Bishop Moore High School (FL)
24	Cody Johnson	Atlanta Braves	1B	A. Crawford Mosley High School (FL)
25	Hank Conger	Los Angeles Angels of Anaheim (Note: Pick from Cleveland Indians as compensation for signing of free agent Paul Byrd)	C	Huntington Beach High School (CA)
26	Bryan Morris	Los Angeles Dodgers (Note: Pick from Los Angeles Angels of Anaheim as compensation for signing of free agent Jeff Weaver)	RHP	Motlow State Community College
27	Jason Place	Boston Red Sox	CF	Wren High School (SC)
28	Daniel Bard	Boston Red Sox (Note: Pick from New York Yankees as compensation for signing of free agent Johnny Damon)	RHP	North Carolina
29	Kyle McCulloch	Chicago White Sox	RHP	Texas
30	Adam Ottavino	St. Louis Cardinals	RHP	Northeastern

== Supplemental first round selections ==
Pick	Player	Team	Position	School
31	Preston Mattingly	Los Angeles Dodgers (Note: Compensation pick for loss of free agent Jeff Weaver)	SS	Evansville Central High School (IN)
32	Pedro Beato	Baltimore Orioles (Note: Compensation pick for loss of free agent B. J. Ryan)	RHP	St. Petersburg College
33	Emmanuel Burriss	San Francisco Giants (Note: Compensation pick for loss of free agent Scott Eyre)	SS	Kent State
34	Brooks Brown	Arizona Diamondbacks (Note: Compensation pick for loss of free agent Tim Worrell)	RHP	Georgia
35	Kyler Burke	San Diego Padres (Note: Compensation pick for loss of free agent Ramón Hernández)	RF	Ooltewah High School (TN)
36	Chris Coghlan	Florida Marlins (Note: Compensation pick for loss of free agent A. J. Burnett)	3B	Ole Miss
37	Adrian Cardenas	Philadelphia Phillies (Note: Compensation pick for loss of free agent Billy Wagner)	SS	Monsignor Edward Pace High School (FL)
38	Cory Rasmus	Atlanta Braves (Note: Compensation pick for loss of free agent Kyle Farnsworth)	RHP	Russell County High School (AL)
39	David Huff	Cleveland Indians (Note: Compensation pick for loss of free agent Bob Howry)	LHP	UCLA
40	Kris Johnson	Boston Red Sox (Note: Compensation pick for loss of free agent Johnny Damon)	LHP	Wichita State
41	Joba Chamberlain	New York Yankees (Note: Compensation pick for loss of free agent Tom Gordon)	RHP	Nebraska
42	Chris Perez	St. Louis Cardinals (Note: Compensation pick for loss of free agent Matt Morris)	RHP	Miami (FL)
43	Steven Evarts	Atlanta Braves (Note: Compensation pick for loss of free agent Rafael Furcal)	LHP	Robinson High School (FL)
44	Caleb Clay	Boston Red Sox (Note: Compensation pick for loss of free agent Bill Mueller)	RHP	Cullman High School (AL)

== Other notable players ==
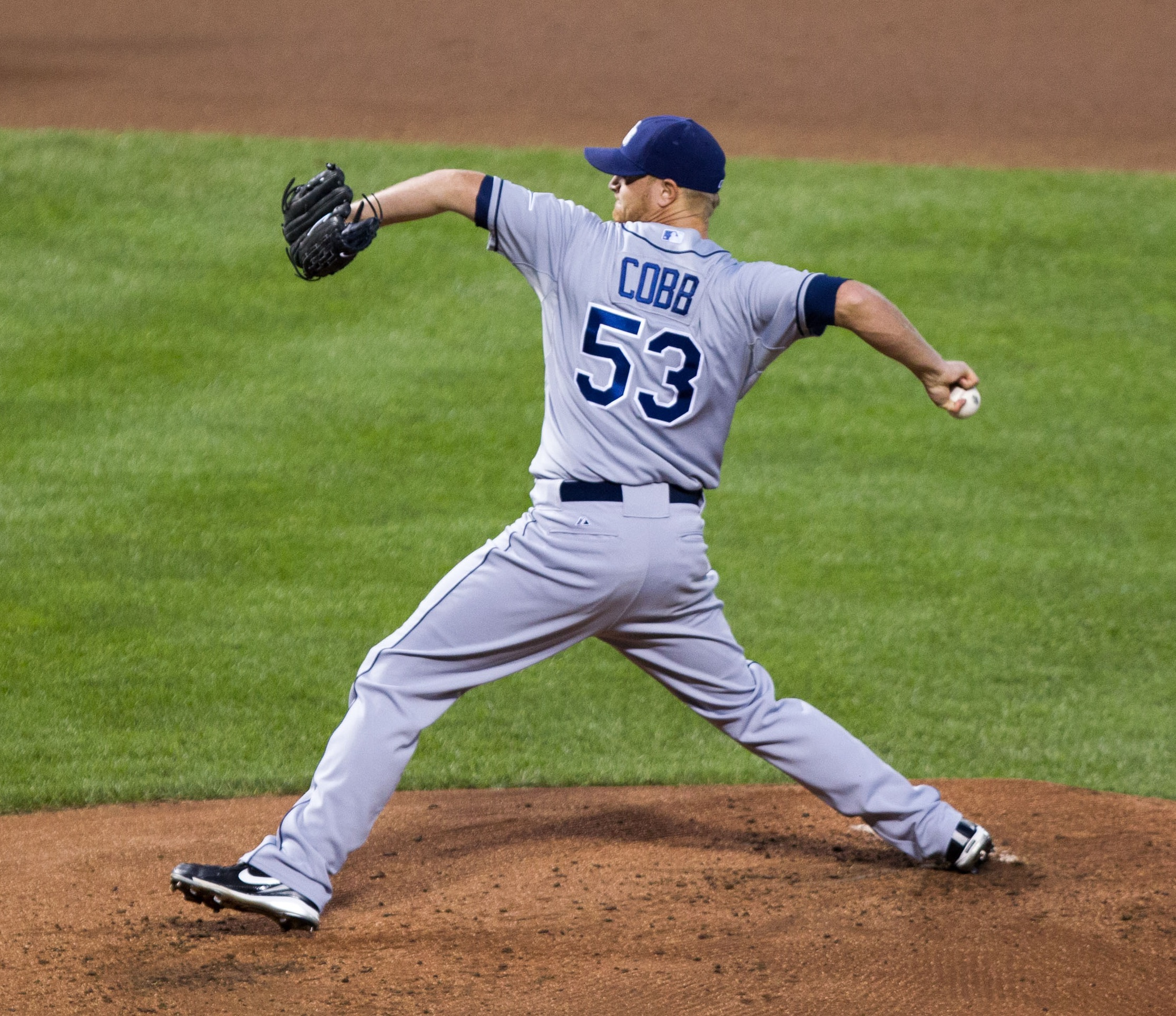
The Rays selected Alex Cobb in the 4th round. Cobb is a 2023 All-Star.

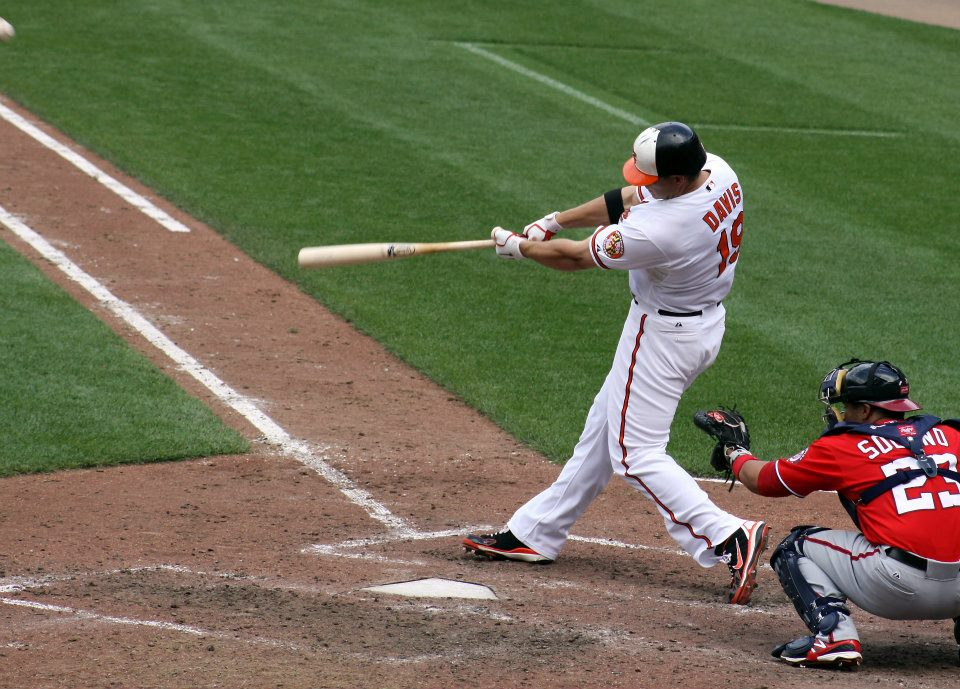
The Rangers selected Chris Davis in the 5th round. He is a 2× MLB home run leader.

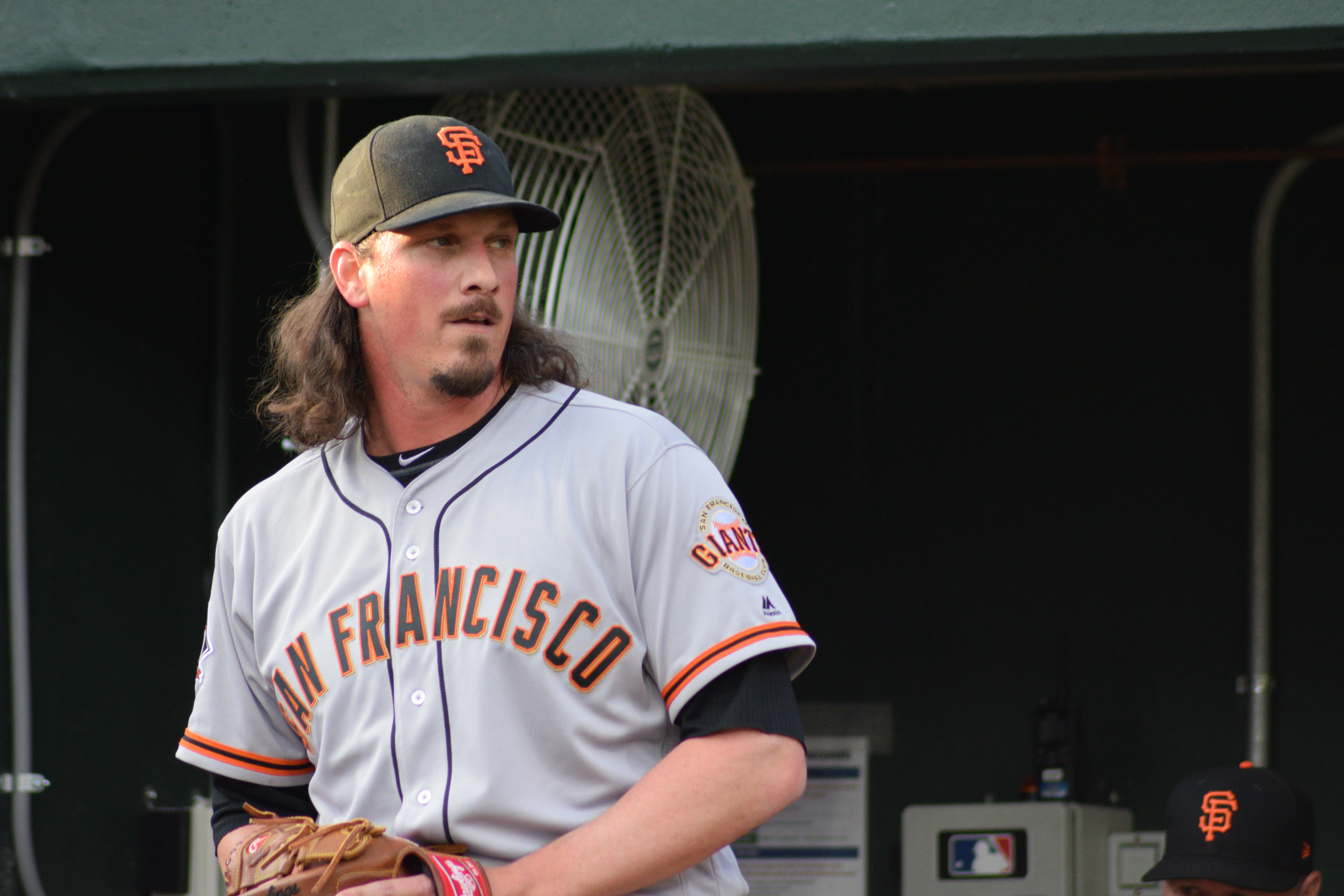
The Cubs selected Jeff Samardzija in the 5th round. He is a 2014 All-Star.

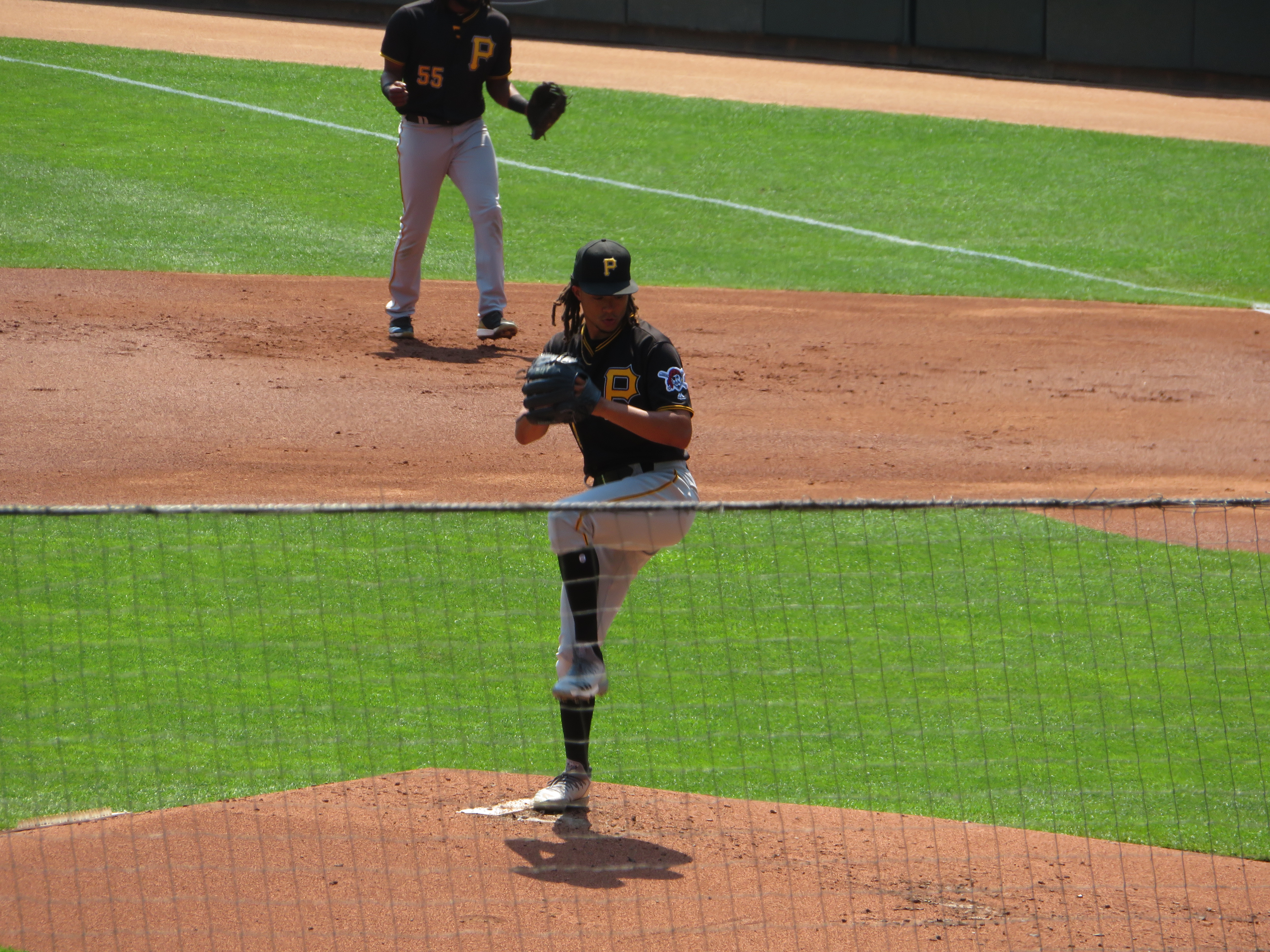
Cleveland selected Chris Archer in the 5th round. Archer is a 2× All-Star.

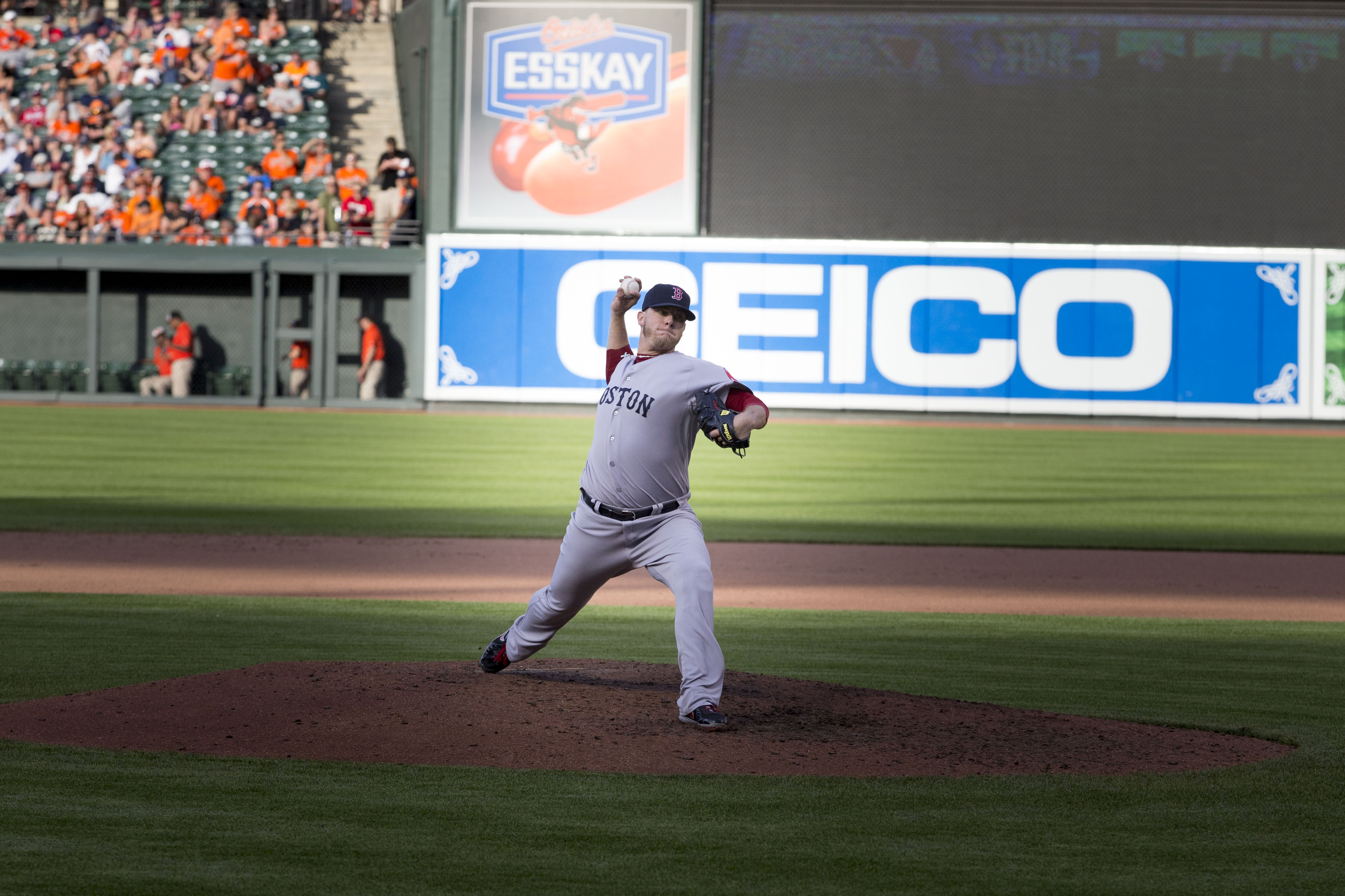
The Oakland Athletics selected Andrew Bailey in the 6th round. The 2009 AL Rookie of the Year is a 2× All-Star.

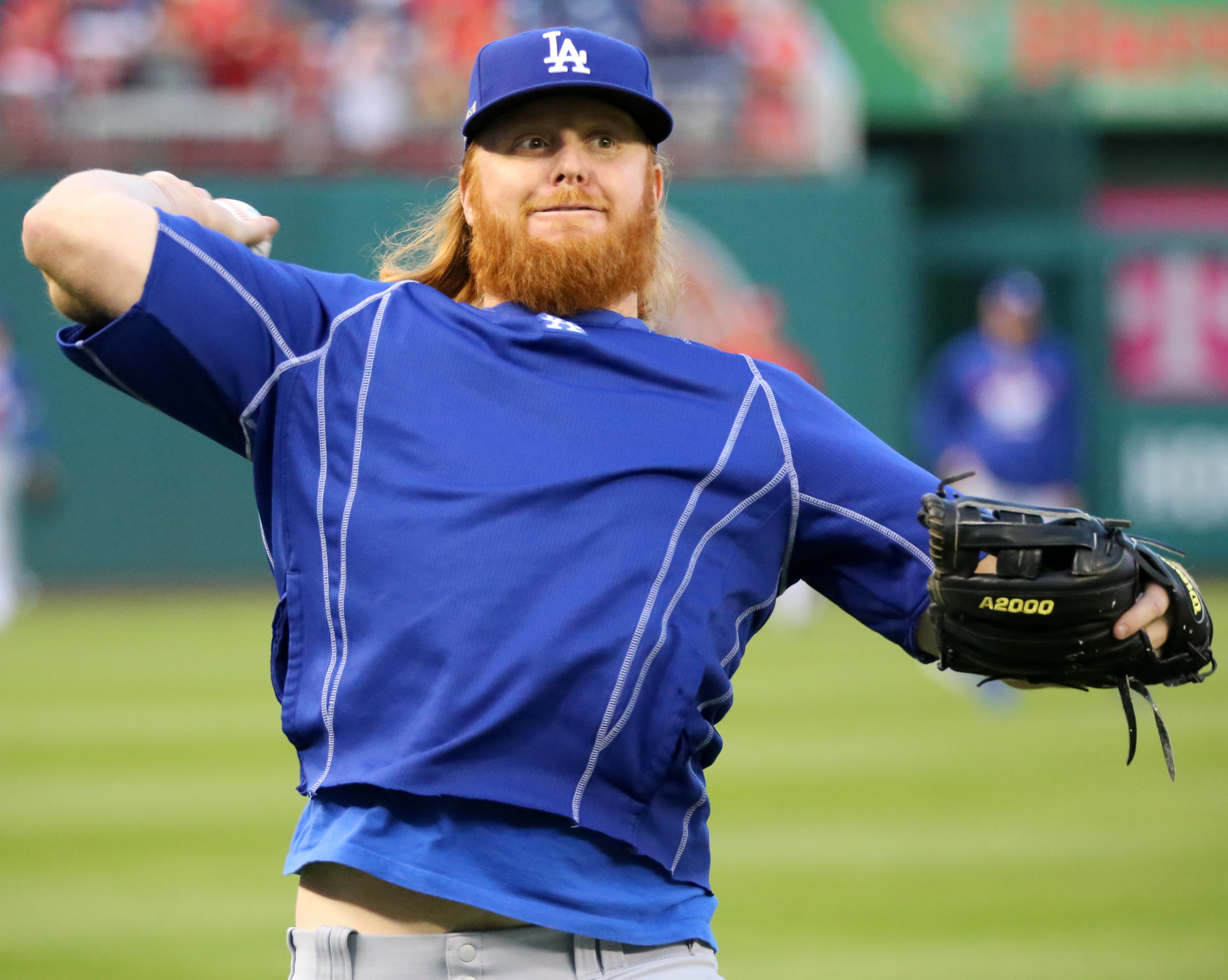
Cincinnati selected Justin Turner in the 7th round. Turner is a 2× All-Star.

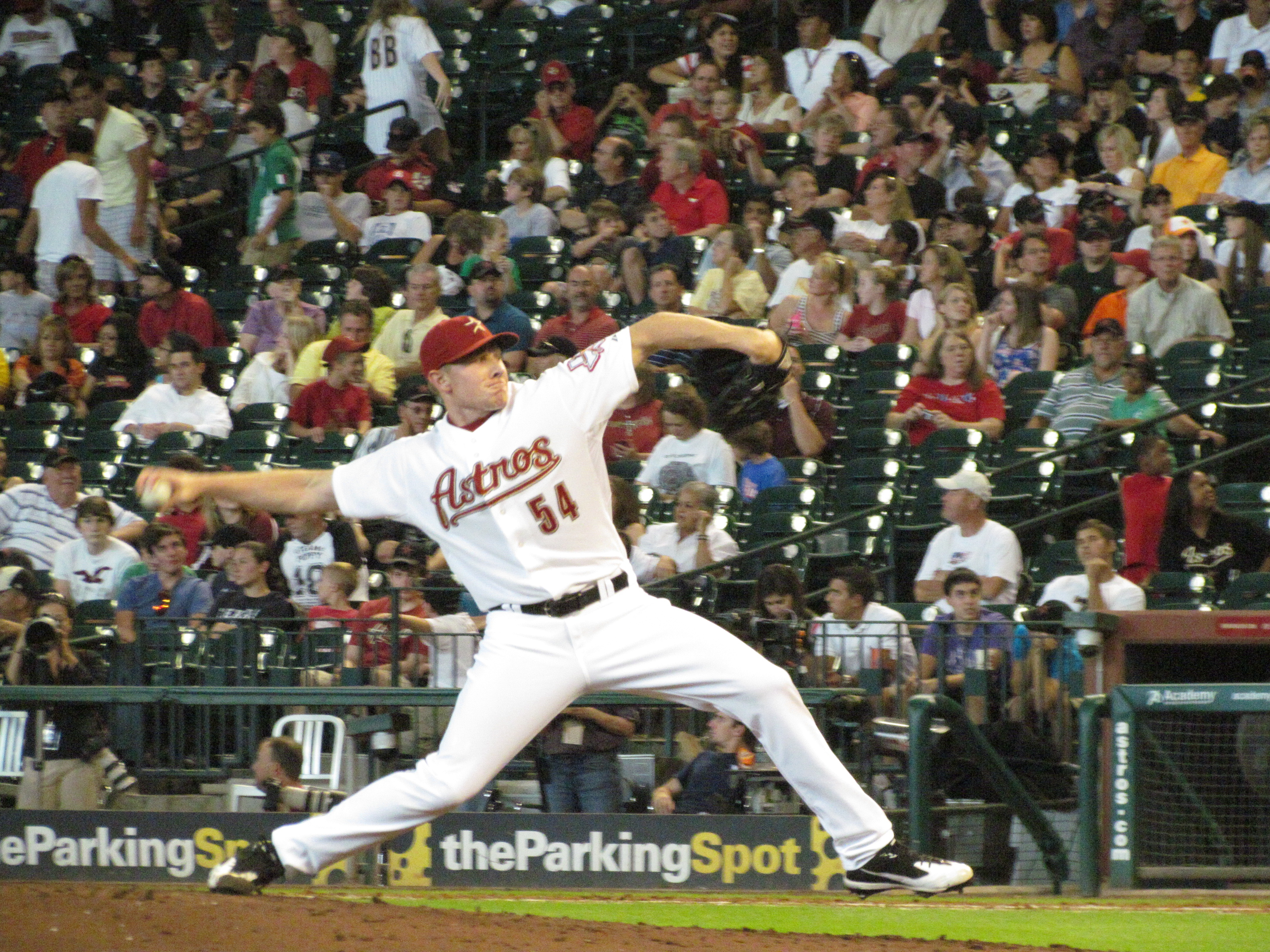
The Yankees selected Mark Melancon in the 9th round. The 4× All-Star is the 2015 NL Reliever of the Year.

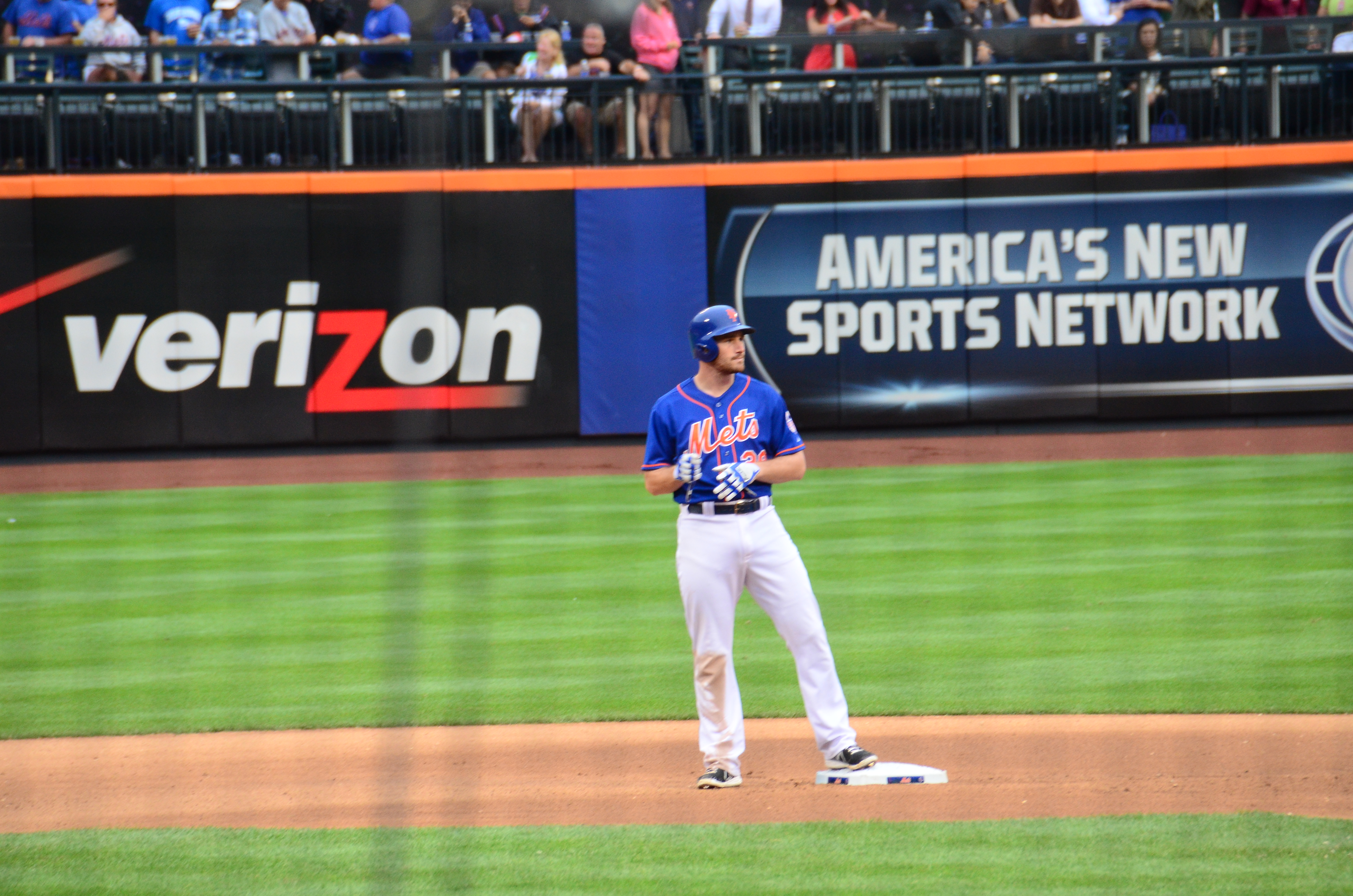
The Mets selected Daniel Murphy in the 13th round. He is a 3× All-Star and 2× Silver Slugger at second base.

- Chris Tillman, 2nd round, 49th overall by the Seattle Mariners
- Jeff Locke, 2nd round, 51st overall by the Atlanta Braves
- Brett Anderson, 2nd round, 55th overall by the Arizona Diamondbacks
- Wade LeBlanc, 2nd round, 61st overall by the San Diego Padres
- Trevor Cahill, 2nd round, 66th overall by the Oakland Athletics
- Justin Masterson, 2nd round, 71st overall by the Boston Red Sox
- Jon Jay, 2nd round, 74th overall by the St. Louis Cardinals
- Brennan Boesch, 3rd round, 82nd overall by the Detroit Tigers
- Zach Britton, 3rd round, 85th overall by the Baltimore Orioles
- Joe Smith, 3rd round, 94th overall by the New York Mets
- Zach McAllister, 3rd round, 104th overall by the New York Yankees
- Alex Cobb, 4th round, 109th overall by the Tampa Bay Devil Rays
- Jared Hughes, 4th round, 110th overall by the Pittsburgh Pirates
- Chris Johnson, 4th round, 129th overall by the Houston Astros
- Chris Davis, 5th round, 148th overall by the Texas Rangers
- Jeff Samardzija, 5th round, 149th overall by the Chicago Cubs
- Christopher Archer, 5th round, 161th overall by the Cleveland Indians
- George Kontos, 5th round, 164th overall by the New York Yankees
- Jason Berken, 6th round, 175th overall by the Baltimore Orioles
- Andrew Bailey, 6th round, 188th overall by the Oakland Athletics
- Bud Norris, 6th round, 189th overall by the Houston Astros
- Doug Fister, 7th round, 201st overall by the Seattle Mariners
- Justin Turner, 7th round, 204th overall by the Cincinnati Reds
- Mike Leake, 7th round, 218th overall by the Oakland Athletics, but did not sign
- Dellin Betances, 8th round, 254th overall by the New York Yankees
- Allen Craig, 8th round, 256th overall by the St. Louis Cardinals
- Will Harris, 9th round, 258th overall by the Colorado Rockies
- David Freese, 9th round, 273rd overall by the San Diego Padres
- Ryan Kalish, 9th round, 283rd overall by the Boston Red Sox
- Mark Melancon, 9th round, 284th overall by the New York Yankees
- Desmond Jennings, 10th round, 289th overall by the Tampa Bay Devil Rays
- Josh Roenicke, 10th round, 294th overall by the Cincinnati Reds
- Craig Gentry, 10th round, 294th overall by the Texas Rangers
- Kris Medlen, 10th round, 310th overall by the Atlanta Braves
- Mat Latos, 11th round, 333rd overall by the San Diego Padres
- Brandon Belt, 11th round, 343rd overall by the Boston Red Sox, but did not sign
- Jordan Walden, 12th round, 372nd overall by the Los Angeles Angels of Anaheim
- Mike Minor, 13th round, 379th overall by the Tampa Bay Devil Rays, but did not sign
- Daniel Murphy, 13th round, 394th overall by the New York Mets
- Daniel McCutchen, 13th round, 404th overall by the New York Yankees
- Matt LaPorta, 14th round, 433rd overall by the Boston Red Sox, but did not sign
- Tommy Pham, 16th round, 496th overall by the St. Louis Cardinals
- Dan Runzler, 17th round, 501st overall by the Seattle Mariners, but did not sign
- Chris Heisey, 17th round, 504th overall by the Cincinnati Reds
- Tony Watson, 17th round, 505th overall by the Baltimore Orioles, but did not sign
- Josh Reddick, 17th round, 523rd overall by the Boston Red Sox
- David Robertson, 17th round, 524th overall by the New York Yankees
- Andrew Cashner, 18th round, 528th overall by the Colorado Rockies, but did not sign
- Danny Valencia, 19th round, 576th overall by the Minnesota Twins
- Josh Tomlin, 19th round, 581st overall by the Cleveland Indians
- Casey Fien, 20th round, 592nd overall by the Detroit Tigers
- Domonic Brown, 20th round, 607th overall by the Philadelphia Phillies
- Vinnie Pestano, 20th round, 611th overall by the Cleveland Indians
- Cory Luebke, 22nd round, 658th overall by the Texas Rangers, but did not sign
- Derek Holland, 25th round, 748th overall by the Texas Rangers
- Billy Mohl, 25th round, 757th overall by the Philadelphia Phillies
- Luke Gregerson, 28th round, 856th overall by the St. Louis Cardinals
- Brock Ungricht, 30th round, 914th overall by the New York Yankees
- Hector Santiago, 30th round, 915th overall by the Chicago White Sox
- Alex Sanabia, 32nd round, 965th overall by the Florida Marlins
- Matt Downs, 36th round, 1076th overall by the San Francisco Giants
- J. D. Martinez, 36th round, 1086th overall by the Minnesota Twins, but did not sign
- Brad Peacock, 41st round, 1231st overall by the Washington Nationals
- Daniel Herrera, 45th round, 1345th overall by the Texas Rangers
- Rocky Gale, 49th round, 1447th overall by the Kansas City Royals, but did not sign
- Paul Goldschmidt, 49th round, 1453rd overall by the Los Angeles Dodgers, but did not sign
- Jarrod Dyson, 50th round, 1475th overall by the Kansas City Royals

=== NFL players drafted ===
- Riley Cooper, 15th round, 457th overall by the Philadelphia Phillies, but did not sign
- Jake Locker, 40th round, 1212th overall by the Los Angeles Angels of Anaheim, but did not sign
- Isaiah Stanback, 45th round, 1342nd overall by the Baltimore Orioles, but did not sign
- Kyle Williams, 47th round, 1417th overall by the Chicago White Sox, but did not sign

== Background ==
Pitching accounted for 18 of the 30 selections in the first round of the 2006 First-Year Player Draft, including the top choice, right-hander Luke Hochevar, who was chosen by the Kansas City Royals. The University of Tennessee product pitched for the Fort Worth Cats of the Independent League after not reaching terms with the Los Angeles Dodgers, who selected him in the sandwich round (40th overall) of the 2005 First-Year Player Draft.

Six of the first seven picks and nine of the first 12 selections were pitchers. In addition to the 18 hurlers, seven outfielders, three third basemen and two catchers made up the rest of the first round.

The first six picks were from the college ranks. University of North Carolina pitchers Andrew Miller (6th overall, Tigers) and Daniel Bard (28th, Red Sox) and University of Texas teammates Drew Stubbs (8th overall, Reds) and Kyle McCulloch (29th, White Sox) went in the first round.

Kyle Drabek, the son of longtime major league pitcher Doug Drabek, was chosen by the Philadelphia Phillies with the 18th pick.

Detroit's Andrew Miller became the first player from the 2006 draft to reach the major leagues. He debuted in relief during a doubleheader at Yankee Stadium on August 30, 2006. He would make eight relief appearances for the Tigers during their pennant-winning season. He also played for the New York Yankees, Baltimore Orioles, Florida Marlins, Boston Red Sox, Cleveland Indians, and St. Louis Cardinals before retiring in 2022.

Tim Lincecum was the first 2006 draftee to be selected to an All-Star Game. Lincecum was selected in 2008 and joined shortly thereafter by Evan Longoria, who was selected via the Final Vote. Only Longoria played in the game. Longoria would later be voted Rookie of the Year. Lincecum was also the first to win a Cy Young Award (2008 and 2009) in the National League. Clayton Kershaw, 7th in the draft, went on to win the 2011, 2013 and 2014 NL Cy Young Awards, the 2014 NL MVP Award and is a 10-time All-Star. Max Scherzer, 11th overall, has also won three Cy Young Awards.

Andrew Bailey, 6th round pick by the Oakland Athletics, became the 2009 American League Rookie of the Year and participated in the 2009 All-Star Game and 2010 All-Star Game as part of the Athletics. He retired after the 2017 season. Chris Coghlan, a supplemental first round pick, was the 2009 National League Rookie of the Year as a member of the Miami Marlins.

Ryan Kalish, an outfielder who planned to attend the University of Virginia, was picked in the 9th round by the Boston Red Sox. His salary of $600,000 had to be approved by the Commissioner's Office, as it was well over what others drafted in that round were to receive. He signed with the Red Sox and made his major league debut in 2010.

Preceded by Justin Upton	1st Overall Picks; Luke Hochevar	Succeeded by David Price
