= Central High School (Phenix City, Alabama) =

Coordinates: 32.4850°N 85.0396°W

Location
- 2400 Dobbs Dr; Phenix City, Russell County, Alabama 36870; United States

Information
- School type: Public School
- School board: Phenix City Board of Education
- School district: Phenix City School District
- Superintendent: Dr. Darrell Seldon
- CEEB code: 012135
- Principal: Kerry McDonald
- Teaching staff: 85.27 (FTE)
- Grades: 10–12
- Enrollment: 1,579 (2024-2025)
- Student to teacher ratio: 18.52
- Colors: Red and Black
- Mascot: Red Devils
- Rival: Opelika High School
- Website: chs.pcboe.net

Central High School (CHS) is a suburban public school located in Phenix City, Alabama. Offering grades 10 through 12, Central Phenix City is the only high school in the Phenix City School District. CHS is connected by one freshman academy, an eighth grade school, and eight elementary schools. The school district is located in the counties of Lee and Russell and neighbor the Russell County School District and the Lee County School District. Some neighboring high schools include but are not limited to: Russell County High School and Smiths Station High School. Central High School served 1,551 students through the 2022–2023 school year. 10% of Central students are from military families due to the close proximity to Fort Benning, GA.

== Academics ==
Central High School offers a variety of challenges courses and classes for its students. Central students are offered dual enrollment courses, advanced placement courses, and honors courses. Overall, Central's rankings within the state of Alabama is 94th, 7,097th in the United States, and 3rd in the Columbus, GA Metro area schools. CHS also ranks 80th in graduation rate in Alabama at 97%, and tied for 5,287th in the country.

Central High School students fell on the 46.9% percentile on the ACT according to US News, which is above the average expectation for the United States. CHS ranked 17th for diversity out of 382 high schools in the state Alabama. 13% of Central students are enrolled in AP Courses. The average ACT score for Central Phenix City is a 22, and the average SAT score is a 1010. The reading proficiency is a 41%, and a 39% for math.

== History ==
Central High School was previously established in more of the center of the city across from the Phenix City Public Library until being reestablished to its current location. Central's enrollment in 1988–1989 school year was 903, and its enrollment has grown ever since. The enrollment ranks 10th among Alabama high schools and has been in the top 25 ever since the 2008–2009 school year.

Central is rivals with multiple school such as Auburn High School, Smiths Station High School, Russell County High School, and Opelika High School.

== Athletics ==
The Central Phenix City Red Devils is ranked 13th best for athletes in the state of Alabama. The school offers many various sports such as: Girls and boys basketball, soccer, tennis, wrestling; as well as softball, volleyball, baseball, football, and flag football.

=== Football ===
In terms of football, Central Phenix City is one of the richest programs around. They have claimed three state titles in 1993, 2018, and 2023. Their all-time record in football is 612-368-33 and a winning percentage of 62%. Central also claims 18 region titles, a 178-60 region record, 135 All-State players, and 13 NFL players. The Red Devils have spent 27 weeks ranked number 1 in the state of Alabama under the AHSAA.

Central's football team was founded in 1928 and has had 96 full football seasons, 66 of those being winning seasons and 30 being losing seasons. Their longest winning streak is 14 which spans from August 25, 2018, to May 12, 2018, which was the season of their 2018 state title. The Red Devils also have an impressive playoff resume with a record of 52-33 all time and a 3–2 record in the Finals.

=== Boys' basketball ===
Central Phenix City is not a one-sport school as they are also impressive in basketball. Although they possess no state titles, they do have multiple tournament appearances and a winning record in the tournament. The Red Devils have appeared in the tournament in the following years: 1943, 1944, 1955, 1957, 1958, 1959, 1960, 1962, 1963, 1978, 1981, 1984, 1986, 1991, 1999, 2003, 2009, 2010, 2016, and 2018. They also have won multiple Area Championships Those titles are as follows: 1978, 1981, 1984, 1986, 1991, 1993, 1995, 1999, 2002, 2003, 2009, 2010, 2011, 2014, 2015, 2016, 2017, 2018, and 2019. Central also possesses 2 District Titles: 1944, and 1962 from the years districts were in place (1923-1963).

The Red Devils' overall record in the Regional Tournament is 124–82. (1994-Current):They have a 29–16 record in the Area, 10–6 record in Sub-Regional, and a 18–8 record in the Regionals. Their overall record in the State Tournament is 9-20. They have a 6–7 record in the 1st Round, a 1–5 record in the 2d Round, a 2- Record in the Semi-Finals, and a 0–2 record in the Finals.

=== Baseball ===
In 2022, Central High School went 30–10 in total throughout the season and playoffs. They defeated Hewitt-Trussville High School 2–1 in the series to claim their school's first Baseball State Title under first-year head coach A.J. KohoeIn.

The Red Devils' worst season in recent years was 2019 when they went 15–12. The last losing season for CHS was 2013 when they went 32–47. Over the past 10 seasons, the Red Devils have produced a record of 254–165.

== Notable alumni ==
- Jeremiah Castille, NFL cornerback for the Tampa Bay Buccaneers
- Javion Cohen, NFL guard for the Cleveland Browns
- Cameron Coleman, college football wide receiver for the Texas Longhorns
- Harvey Glance, Olympic gold medalist, 4 × 100m relay
- A. J. Harris, college football cornerback for the Indiana Hoosiers
- Bryan Hebson, MLB pitcher for the Montreal Expos
- Cordaro Howard, NFL guard for the Buffalo Bills
- Billy Jackson, NFL running back for the Kansas City Chiefs
- James Joseph, NFL running back for the Philadelphia Eagles
- Herman Lee, NFL offensive tackle for Chicago Bears
- Eddie Lowe, CFL linebacker for the Saskatchewan Roughriders, mayor of Phenix City
- Woodrow Lowe, NFL linebacker for the San Diego Chargers
- Reggie Lowe, NFL defensive end for the Jacksonville Jaguars
- Triandos Luke, NFL wide receiver for the Denver Broncos
- J. D. McKissic, NFL running back for the Washington Commanders
- Jackson Meeks, NFL wide receiver for the Detroit Lions
- Red Morgan, college football defensive back for the Alabama Crimson Tide
- Rakeem Nuñez-Roches, NFL nose tackle for the Tampa Bay Buccaneers
- T.J. Parker, NFL linebacker for the Buffalo Bills
- Justyn Ross, NFL wide receiver for the Kansas City Chiefs
- E.J. Williams Jr., NFL wide receiver for the Las Vegas Raiders
- Ucambre Williams, CFL football offensive lineman
