= Reggie Lowe =

American football player (born 1975)

No. 57
- Position: Defensive end

Personal information
- Born: June 14, 1975 (age 51); Washington, D.C., U.S.
- Listed height: 6 ft 2 in (1.88 m)
- Listed weight: 250 lb (113 kg)

Career information
- High school: Central (Phenix City, Alabama)
- College: Troy
- NFL draft: 1998: undrafted

Career history
- Seattle Seahawks (1998)*; Baltimore Ravens (1998)*; Jacksonville Jaguars (1998); Rhein Fire (1999); Pittsburgh Steelers (1999); Los Angeles Xtreme (2001); Montreal Alouettes (2002)
- * Offseason or practice squad member only

Awards and highlights
- Grey Cup champion (2002)
- Stats at Pro Football Reference

Reggie Lowe (born June 14, 1975) is an American former professional football player who was a defensive end in the National Football League (NFL), XFL, and Canadian Football League (CFL). He played college football for the Troy Trojans. Lowe played professionally for the Jacksonville Jaguars in 1998, Los Angeles Xtreme in 2001 and Montreal Alouettes in 2002.

Lowe attended Central High School in Phenix City, Alabama. His father, Eddie, played in the Canadian Football League and became mayor of Phenix City.
