= Eddie Lowe (Canadian football) =

American politician and player of Canadian football

Mayor of Phenix City, Alabama
- Incumbent
- Assumed office November 5, 2012
- Preceded by: Sonny Coulter

Personal details
- Born: February 1, 1960 (age 66) Columbus, Georgia, U.S.
- Spouse: Deborah Lowe
- Children: 3, including Reggie Lowe
- Education: University of Alabama
- Football career

Profile
- Position: Linebacker

Career information
- College: Alabama

Career history
- 1983–1991: Saskatchewan Roughriders

Awards and highlights
- Grey Cup champion (1989); CFL All-Star (1989); CFL West All-Star (1989); National champion (1979)

Eddie Lowe (born February 1, 1960) is an American former professional football player who was a linebacker for nine seasons with the Saskatchewan Roughriders of the Canadian Football League (CFL). He was recruited in 1983 after playing college football for the Alabama Crimson Tide. Lowe is currently mayor of Phenix City, Alabama. He is the first black mayor of Phenix City.

== Football career ==
Lowe played football at Central High School in Phenix City. He attended the University of Tennessee at Chattanooga for a year before transferring to the University of Alabama, where he played for the Crimson Tide as a walk-on. His older brother, Woodrow Lowe, also played at Central and Alabama, before going on to a career in the NFL. At 5' 10", Eddie was considered too small to play in the NFL, but he was recruited to play Canadian football with the Saskatchewan Roughriders. In 1989, he won the 77th Grey Cup with Saskatchewan and was named a CFL all-star. After the 1991 CFL season, he retired from football.

From 1992 until at least 2012, Lowe volunteered as an assistant to his brother Woodrow, coaching football at their alma mater of Central High School.

== Political career ==
After retiring from football, Lowe began working as a banker. Prior to his election as mayor, Lowe served as president of the Phenix City Board of Education for a decade. In 2012, he was elected the first African-American mayor of Phenix City with 64 percent of the votes cast. He beat three opponents in the race, by a large enough margin to avoid a runoff election.

== Personal life ==
Lowe is married with three children. His son Reggie became a National Football League player. Lowe's brothers include College Football Hall of Fame member Woodrow and James Jr.

== See also ==
- List of first African-American mayors
