= Caleb Clay =

American baseball player (born 1988)

- Pitcher
- Born: February 15, 1988 (age 38); Birmingham, Alabama, U.S.
- Batted: Right Threw: Right

KBO debut
- March 30, 2014, for the Hanwha Eagles

Last KBO appearance
- June 10, 2014, for the Hanwha Eagles

KBO statistics
- Win–loss record: 3–4
- Earned run average: 8.32
- Strikeouts: 20
- Stats at Baseball Reference

Teams
- Hanwha Eagles (2014)

Caleb Russell Clay (born February 15, 1988) is an American former professional baseball pitcher. He played in the KBO League for the Hanwha Eagles. He was drafted in the 1st round of the 2006 MLB draft by the Boston Red Sox.

== Career ==
=== Boston Red Sox ===
Clay was drafted by the Boston Red Sox in the first round, with the 44th overall selection, of the 2006 Major League Baseball draft out of Cullman High School in Cullman, Alabama. He made his professional debut in 2007 with the Low–A Lowell Spinners, recording a 2.14 ERA with 9 strikeouts over 5 starts. On August 3, 2007, it was announced that Clay would require Tommy John surgery, ending his season. He made two appearances for the rookie–level Gulf Coast League Red Sox in 2008 as he continued his recovery from surgery.

Clay returned to regular action in 2009 with the Single–A Greenville Drive. In 25 games (16 starts), he registered a 6–7 record and 4.01 ERA with 67 strikeouts across 110 innings of work. Clay spent the 2010 campaign with the High–A Salem Red Sox, compiling a 4–13 record and 4.57 ERA with 67 strikeouts over 26 appearances (25 starts).

In 2011, Clay played for the Double–A Portland Sea Dogs, making 28 appearances and struggling a 7.47 ERA with 53 strikeouts in 59 innings. He returned to Portland in 2012, compiling a 4.61 ERA with 61 strikeouts and 9 saves across 34 appearances.

=== Washington Nationals ===
On November 15, 2012, Clay signed a minor league contract with the Washington Nationals organization. He reached Triple–A for the first time in his career that year. In 27 games (26 starts) split between the Double–A Harrisburg Senators and Triple–A Syracuse Chiefs, Clay accumulated an 11–5 record and 2.96 ERA with 110 strikeouts across 158 1/3 innings pitched. He elected free agency following the season on November 4, 2013.

=== Hanwha Eagles ===
On November 10, 2013, Clay signed a minor league contract with the San Francisco Giants organization. However, Clay signed with the Hanwha Eagles of the KBO League on December 18. In 10 starts for the Eagles in 2014, Clay struggled to a 3–4 record and 8.33 ERA with 20 strikeouts over 40 innings pitched.

=== Los Angeles Angels ===
On June 21, 2014, Clay signed a minor league contract with the Los Angeles Angels of Anaheim. On August 10, Clay was selected to the 40-man roster and promoted to the major leagues for the first time. He went unused out of the bullpen and was optioned to the minors on August 12, becoming a phantom ballplayer. The next day, Clay was removed from the 40–man roster and sent outright to the Triple–A Salt Lake Bees.

=== Arizona Diamondbacks ===
On November 20, 2014, Clay signed a minor league contract with the Arizona Diamondbacks. He spent the year with the Triple–A Reno Aces, also making one start for the Double–A Mobile BayBears. In 22 games (20 starts) for Reno, Clay logged an 8–7 record and 5.25 ERA with 56 strikeouts across 111 1/3 innings pitched. He elected free agency following the season on November 6, 2015.
