= Cory Rasmus =

American baseball player (born 1987)

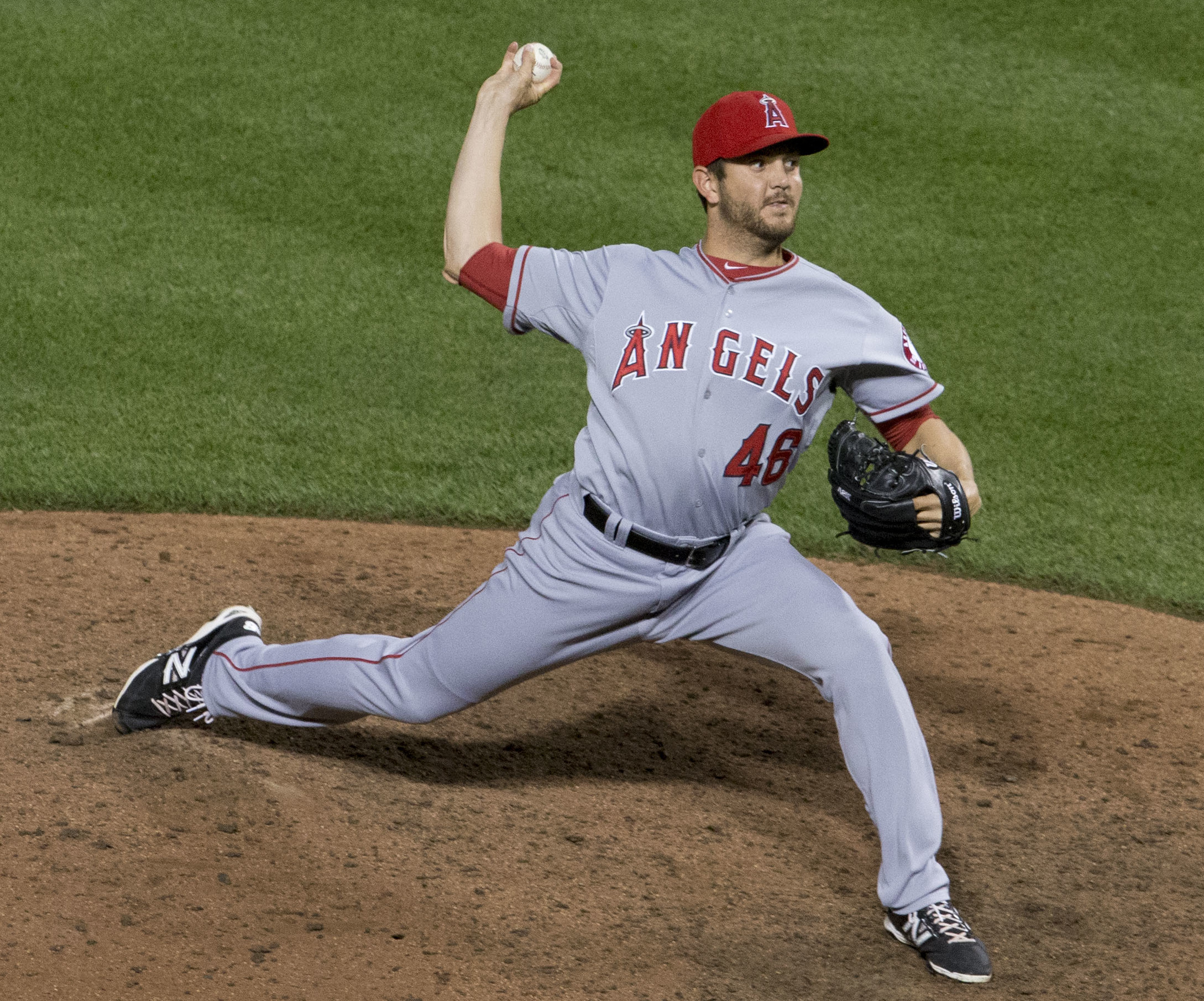
- Rasmus with the Angels in 2014
- Pitcher
- Born: November 6, 1987 (age 39); Columbus, Georgia, U.S.
- Batted: Right Threw: Right

MLB debut
- May 22, 2013, for the Atlanta Braves

Last MLB appearance
- October 1, 2016, for the Los Angeles Angels

MLB statistics
- Win–loss record: 4–5
- Earned run average: 4.17
- Strikeouts: 121
- Stats at Baseball Reference

Teams
- Atlanta Braves (2013); Los Angeles Angels of Anaheim / Los Angeles Angels (2013–2016)

Cory Taylor Rasmus (born November 6, 1987) is an American former professional baseball player. He pitched in Major League Baseball (MLB) for the Atlanta Braves and Los Angeles Angels from 2013 to 2016. He was the first round selection of Atlanta in the 2006 MLB draft and pitched in three MLB games for the franchise in 2013. He was traded to the Angels that July for Scott Downs.

Rasmus is the younger brother of MLB player Colby Rasmus. He and his brother played in the 1999 Little League World Series (LLWS), and his daughter and nephew played in the 2026 LLWS.

== Playing career ==
=== Amateur career ===
Rasmus was a high school All-American as a pitcher at Russell County High School in Seale, Alabama. Teaming with Kasey Kiker, Russell County won a high school national championship in 2005. Rasmus threw a 97-mile-per-hour (156 km/h) fastball in the fall of 2005.

=== Atlanta Braves ===
The Atlanta Braves selected Rasmus in the first round, with the 38th overall selection, of the 2006 MLB draft. He signed for a $900,000 signing bonus. After his debut professional season, Baseball America ranked his curveball as the best in Atlanta's minor league system. He missed the 2007 season with a shoulder injury and pitched four games in 2008 in the Gulf Coast League. He was named the Appalachian League pitcher of the week after winning consecutive games in August 2009. He was a South Atlantic League mid-season All-Star in 2010. He missed most of the 2011 season with injuries. He converted to a relief pitcher role in 2012, tying for the Mississippi Braves lead with 50 games pitched. After the season, he played in the Arizona Fall League, and the Braves added him to their 40-man roster.

Rasmus played for the Triple-A Gwinnett Braves in 2013 until he was called up to the Braves on May 18. He made his major league debut on May 22, working 1 2/3 innings and striking out three while giving up home runs to Aaron Hicks and Oswaldo Arcia. On May 27, Rasmus pitched to his older brother Colby Rasmus for the first time in an MLB game, allowing a double. This was the first time that a player pitched to his brother in an MLB game since June 13, 2010.

Rasmus was optioned back to Gwinnett on May 29 when Jordan Walden was activated from the disabled list. Rasmus returned to Atlanta, pitching three innings in the first game of a doubleheader on June 18, allowing a home run to John Buck of the New York Mets.

=== Los Angeles Angels of Anaheim / Los Angeles Angels ===
On July 29, 2013, Atlanta traded Rasmus to the Los Angeles Angels of Anaheim for Scott Downs. Rasmus was then optioned to the Triple-A Salt Lake Bees and was called back up the majors on August 23.

Rasmus started the 2014 season in Triple-A Salt Lake. He was recalled by the Angels on May 5. In MLB, Rasmus shifted between the bullpen and starting rotation, spot starting in six games for the Angels. As a starter, he averaged fewer than five innings pitched in each start. He finished the season with a 2.57 earned run average in 30 games, six of them starts. He finished Game 3 of the American League Division Series, throwing 2 2/3 scoreless innings as the Kansas City Royals swept the Angels.

In 2015 and 2016, Rasmus didn't show the same level of success from his rookie season. On July 6, 2016, the team announced that Rasmus would need core muscle surgery, ending his season and his tenure in MLB. Rasmus was designated for assignment on November 7. After clearing waivers, Rasmus was assigned to Triple-A, but he rejected the minor league assignment and elected free agency on November 16.

=== Tampa Bay Rays ===
On February 1, 2017, Rasmus signed a minor league contract with the Tampa Bay Rays. After dealing with an injury in spring training, he was released on April 7.

== Player profile ==
Rasmus was known for his fastball that reached 97 mph (156 km/h) and a good curveball as a high schooler and after he was drafted. Years later when he pitched in MLB, his fastball averaged 92.4 mph (148.7 km/h). His offspeed pitches included his curve as well as a changeup and slider. He allowed home runs and walks more often than the MLB average while having a higher strikeout rate.

== Personal life ==
Rasmus is the younger brother of former MLB outfielder Colby Rasmus. Both brothers played for Phenix City National Little League during the 1999 Little League World Series (LLWS). Phenix City won the United States championship game, before losing in the finals to the Hirakata Little League team from Osaka, Japan, 5–0. Their younger brother was a catcher in the St. Louis Cardinals' minor league organization until retiring in June 2014. Another younger brother played college baseball in 2011 and 2012. Their father was drafted by the Angels in 1986, playing three seasons in the minors before retiring. He coached Rasmus and Colby in Little League and high school.

Rasmus's wife played college softball for the Southern Mississippi Golden Eagles. Their daughter, Kinley, pitched for Phenix City in the 2026 LLWS. She had eight strikeouts in a loss to Soundview Little League of the Northwest Region, tying a record for most strikeouts by a girl in a LLWS game previously set by Mo'ne Davis. Kinley's cousin took the loss in the game. Rasmus is an assistant coach for his daughter's team. Former MLB catcher Jeff Mathis is Rasmus's wife's brother.

Rasmus was the valedictorian of his high school class.

Following his playing career, Rasmus became a real estate agent.
