= Colby Rasmus =

American baseball player (born 1986)

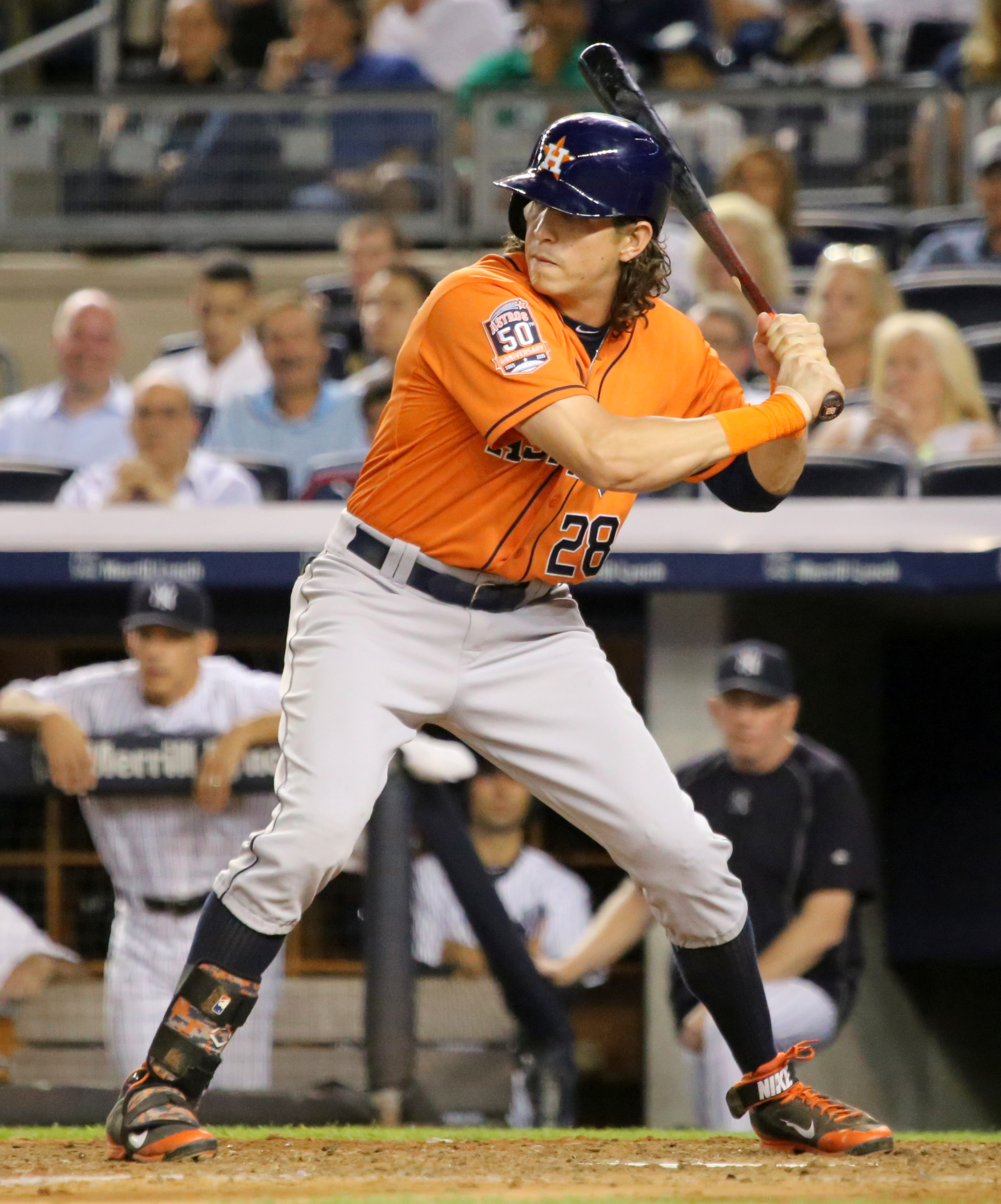
- Rasmus with the Houston Astros in 2015
- Outfielder
- Born: August 11, 1986 (age 40); Columbus, Georgia, U.S.
- Batted: Left Threw: Left

MLB debut
- April 7, 2009, for the St. Louis Cardinals

Last MLB appearance
- July 1, 2018, for the Baltimore Orioles

MLB statistics
- Batting average: .241
- Home runs: 166
- Runs batted in: 491
- Stats at Baseball Reference

Teams
- St. Louis Cardinals (2009–2011); Toronto Blue Jays (2011–2014); Houston Astros (2015–2016); Tampa Bay Rays (2017); Baltimore Orioles (2018)
Medals
Men's baseball
Representing United States
Baseball World Cup
Gold medal – first place	2007 Tianmu	National team

Colby Ryan Rasmus (born August 11, 1986) is an American former professional baseball outfielder. He played in Major League Baseball (MLB) for the St. Louis Cardinals, Toronto Blue Jays, Houston Astros, Tampa Bay Rays and Baltimore Orioles. He has also played for the United States national baseball team.

== Early years ==
Rasmus played as pitcher and first baseman for Phenix City National Little League during the 1999 Little League World Series. Phenix City won the United States championship game, before losing in the finals to Osaka, Japan, 5–0. Rasmus finished the World Series with a batting average of .417 and a pitching record of 0–1 with seven strikeouts.

Rasmus attended Russell County High School in Seale, Alabama. As a senior, he batted .484 with 24 home runs, 66 RBIs, and 69 runs scored in 39 games. His 24 home runs passed Bo Jackson for second all-time in the state for home runs in a season by a high school player. In a pre-draft workout, Rasmus was clocked at 95 mph (153 km/h) throwing from center field. He also ran 60 yards in 6.7 seconds. Rasmus helped lead Russell County to a national championship in 2005 as they finished the season ranked first in both the National High School Baseball Coaches Association poll and the USA TODAY Super 25 baseball rankings. Rasmus graduated from Russell County High School in 2005. He committed to play college baseball at Auburn University for the Auburn Tigers.

== Professional career ==
=== Minor leagues ===
The St. Louis Cardinals selected Rasmus with the 28th pick of the 2005 Major League Baseball draft. The pick was sent to the Cardinals from the Boston Red Sox in compensation for the Red Sox signing Édgar Rentería in free agency. Rasmus received a $1,000,000 signing bonus from the Cardinals.

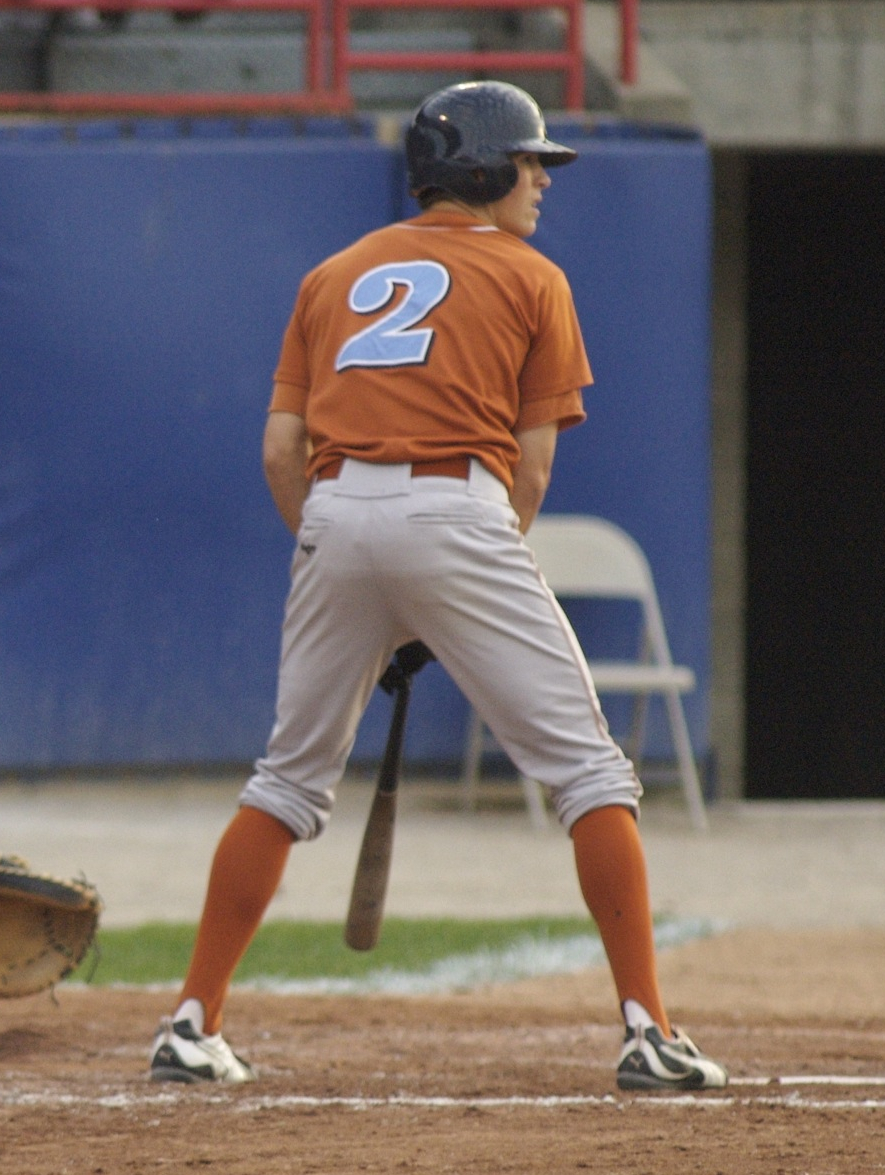
Rasmus batting for the Swing of the Quad Cities in 2006

Rasmus made his professional debut in 2005 with the Johnson City Cardinals of the Rookie-level Appalachian League. In 62 games, he batted .296 with seven home runs and 27 RBIs. Rasmus began the 2006 season with the Swing of the Quad Cities of the Class A Midwest League, and ended his 2006 season, his second in professional baseball, on the Palm Beach Cardinals of the Class A-Advanced Florida State League. In 131 games between Quad Cities and Palm Beach, he combined for a .288 average, 16 home runs, 26 doubles, with 12 home runs. He won the Player of the Month Award in August.

For the 2007 season, Rasmus was assigned to the Springfield Cardinals of the Class AA Texas League. The Tulsa Drillers (Double-A) manager, Stu Cole, commented on Rasmus' talent: "If there was a five-tool player in the league last year, Rasmus was the one. He brought everything to the table. And defensively he made more plays to save his team runs. If the ball was in the air there was a chance you were going to see something exciting." In 128 games for Springfield, he slashed .275/.381/.551 with 29 home runs, 72 RBIs, and 18 stolen bases. Later, he played in the Arizona Fall League during winter of 2007 for Team USA. He batted .286 over six games.

In 2008, Rasmus was a non-roster invitee to the Cardinals in spring training to try and claim a regular spot in the lineup after the Cardinals traded Jim Edmonds on December 15, 2007. On March 17, 2008, the Cardinals assigned Rasmus to the Memphis Redbirds of the Triple-A Pacific Coast League. In 90 games for Memphis, he batted .251 with 11 home runs and 36 RBIs. He missed time during the season due to injury.

In 2008, Rasmus was selected to play baseball as a member of the United States national baseball team in the Beijing Olympics. He was unable to attend due to injury.

=== St. Louis Cardinals ===
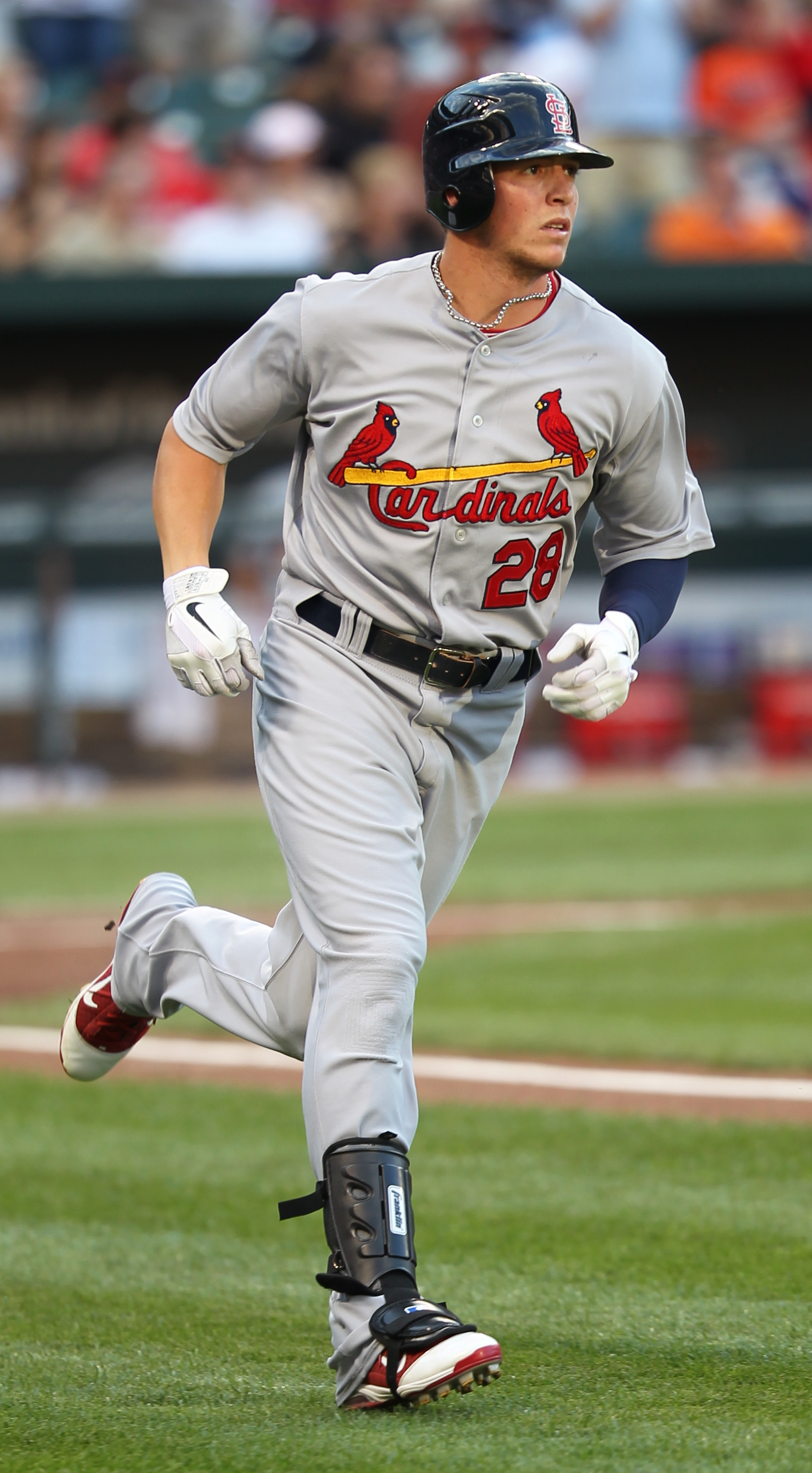
Rasmus with the St. Louis Cardinals in 2011

On January 23, 2009, the Cardinals gave out 20 non-roster invitations (including three free agents) to spring training, including their top minor-league players Rasmus and Brett Wallace. Rasmus was included in Baseball America's 2009 Top 100 Prospects list as the No. 3 prospect in MLB.

On April 3, 2009, Rasmus was named to the opening day roster of the Cardinals. He made his major-league debut on April 7 against Pittsburgh at Busch Stadium. He earned his first major league hit in his second career at-bat, on a single to right field off Pittsburgh's Ian Snell. On May 2, he hit his first home run vs. the Washington Nationals while Pujols took a day off.

On June 19, he had his first four-hit game, in a 10–5 victory against the Kansas City Royals in which Pujols scored his 1000th career run. On July 1, he hit his first career walk-off home run off Bob Howry, giving the Cardinals a 2–1 victory over the San Francisco Giants, leading all NL rookies with eight home runs and 29 RBIs. He was the first Cardinals rookie to hit a game-winning home run since Andy Van Slyke in August 1983. Rasmus hit his first career grand slam against the Cincinnati Reds' Bronson Arroyo. For the 2009 season, he batted .251/.307/.407 with 16 home runs and 52 RBIs in 147 games.

Rasmus returned to St. Louis in 2010. On September 5, 2010, it was reported that Rasmus requested a trade from general manager John Mozeliak because of a shortage of playing time, and a strained relationship with manager Tony La Russa. Rasmus attempted to downplay the rumor, and Mozeliak indicated he would not trade Rasmus. Rasmus finished his second full season with St. Louis with 23 home runs, 66 RBIs, and a .276 batting average in 144 games.

In the first half of 2011, with the Cardinals, Rasmus batted .246/.332/.420 with 11 home runs and 40 RBIs in 94 games.

=== Toronto Blue Jays ===
On July 27, 2011, Rasmus was traded to the Toronto Blue Jays along with P. J. Walters, Brian Tallet, and Trever Miller for Edwin Jackson, Octavio Dotel, Marc Rzepczynski, and Corey Patterson. As a Blue Jay, Rasmus finished the season with a .173/.201/.316 triple-slash line along with three home runs and 13 RBIs in 35 games. His combined batting statistics in 2011 were .225/.298/.391 with 14 home runs and 53 RBIs in 129 games.

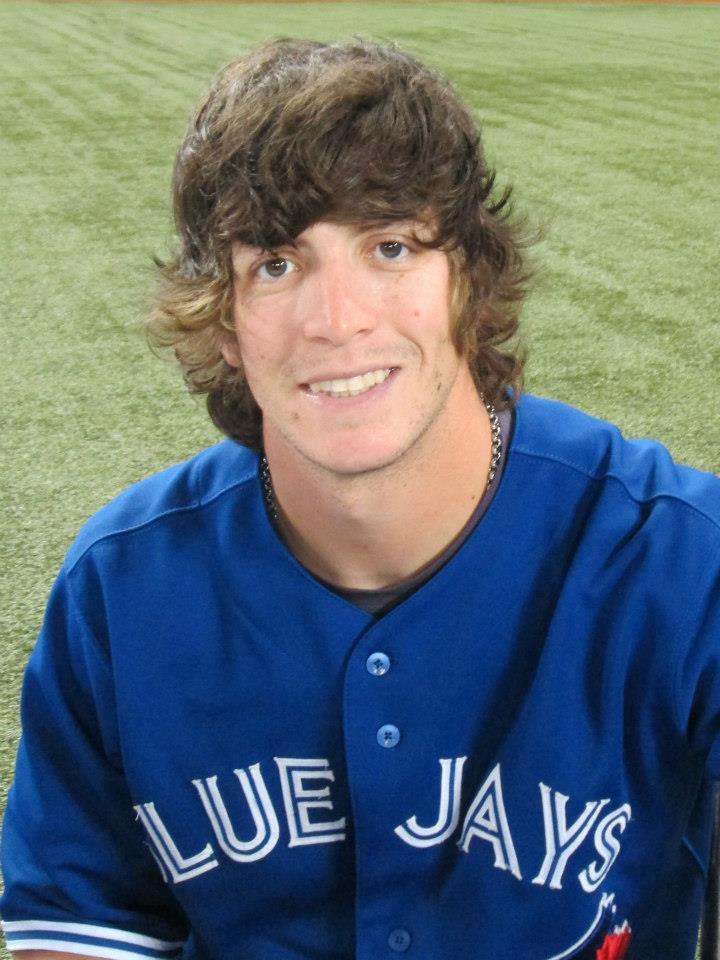
Rasmus with the Toronto Blue Jays in 2012

In January 2012, Rasmus and the Blue Jays agreed on a one-year deal worth $2.7 million. In an interleague game against the Milwaukee Brewers on June 19, Rasmus hit the first of three straight solo home runs by the Blue Jays, followed by José Bautista and Edwin Encarnación, the first time in the 2012 season that the Jays went back-to-back-to-back with home runs, and the sixth time in franchise history. Rasmus finished his 2012 campaign batting .223/.289/.400 with 23 home runs and 75 RBIs in 151 games.

On January 14, 2013, Rasmus signed a one-year contract worth $4.675 million with the Blue Jays, avoiding salary arbitration. Rasmus hit a double against his brother, Cory, in a game against the Atlanta Braves on May 27, 2013. On July 28, 2013, Rasmus hit a walk-off single against the Houston Astros, leading the Blue Jays to a 2–1 victory. Later that day, he was the subject of an article naming him, along with Adam Jones and Mike Trout, as the best active center fielders in baseball.

On August 2, 2013, Rasmus was named the Blue Jays Player of the Month for July by the Toronto chapter of the Baseball Writers' Association of America. In July, Rasmus batted .371 with 3 home runs and 17 RBIs, and also recorded an OPS of 1.001. Rasmus went on the disabled list for the first time as a Blue Jay on August 14, with an oblique strain. He was activated from the disabled list on September 13. In his first two games back, Rasmus hit two home runs to reach 20 for the season. In doing so, he became the fifth Blue Jay to hit 20 home runs in the 2013 season, and Toronto became the only franchise to have five players reach the 20 home run plateau (Rasmus, Edwin Encarnación, José Bautista, J. P. Arencibia, and Adam Lind).

Rasmus was hit in the face by a ball thrown by Anthony Gose during warmups prior to the bottom of the first inning in a game against Boston on September 20. He was placed on the disabled list the next day, ending his 2013 season. Rasmus ended his best season as a Blue Jay with a .276 average, 22 home runs, and 66 RBIs in 118 games.

Rasmus was announced as the Blue Jays' Wilson Defensive Player of the Year on November 7, 2013. In January 2014, he filed for salary arbitration with Toronto, but came to terms on a one-year, $7 million contract on January 17. In a game against the Baltimore Orioles on April 12, 2014, Rasmus hit his 100th career home run. He was placed on the disabled list on May 15 with a sore hamstring and missed roughly a month of games.

Rasmus experienced a decline in his play from that point onward, and, beginning in late August, was demoted to a bench role in favor of Gose, Kevin Pillar, and later Dalton Pompey. He received only one start in September and had a total of 13 at-bats, finishing the season batting .225/.287/.448, with 18 home runs and 40 RBIs in 104 games. Eligible for free agency for the first time in his career, it was widely speculated that Rasmus would not seek to re-sign with the Blue Jays, nor would Toronto be interested in retaining him.

=== Houston Astros ===
On January 20, 2015, Rasmus signed a one-year, $8 million contract with the Houston Astros. As an everyday starter for the Astros, he finished the 2015 season batting .238/.314/.475 with 25 home runs and 61 RBIs in 137 games played.

In the American League Wild Card Game against the New York Yankees, Rasmus hit a solo home run to score the first run of an eventual 3–0 win that advanced the Astros to the American League Division Series (ALDS). He also homered in each of the first two games of the ALDS. In the process, he set an MLB record for having an extra-base hit in each of his first six career postseason games, dating back to his tenure with the Cardinals. The Astros went on to lose the series and Rasmus finished the playoffs leading his team in nearly every offensive category. He batted 7 for 17 (.412 average) along with four home runs, six RBIs, seven walks, and an OPS of 1.760.

On November 12, 2015, Rasmus became the first player in MLB history to accept a qualifying offer, signing a one-year, $15.8 million contract to return to Houston.

For the 2016 season, he batted .206/.286/.355 (hitting .226 against righties, but .136 against lefties) with 15 home runs and 54 RBIs in 107 games. In October, he had hip and hernia surgery.

=== Tampa Bay Rays ===
In January 2017, Rasmus agreed to a one-year contract with the Tampa Bay Rays with a $5 million base salary and up to $2 million in incentives. On June 23, he went on the disabled list with left hip soreness. The Rays planned to re-activate him on June 30, but he never returned to the lineup.

On July 13, with the Rays in the middle of a pennant race, Rasmus announced that he had decided to "step away from baseball", and was taking a "leave of absence" from Major League Baseball. The Rays released a statement saying that they "fully support Colby's decision..." and would "respect... the privacy of Colby and his family...", offering no further comment. Following this, they placed him on the restricted list, which is not paid; Rasmus thus was not paid $2.2 million. Rasmus later said: "Man, it wasn't fulfilling me with all the happiness in the world... Chasing the dream, chasing the money — leaves you kind of empty. So I wanted to go home and just enjoy the time away." For the season, he played in 32 games in the majors, batting .281/.318/.579 (hitting .291 against righties, but .182 against lefties), while in the minors he hit .087/.154/.261 in 23 at-bats.

=== Baltimore Orioles ===
On February 21, 2018, Rasmus signed a minor league contract with the Baltimore Orioles for $3 million if he made the major league roster, plus up to $2 million in incentives, with an invitation to spring training. Rasmus said: "Just felt like I wanted to give it another go." He was expected to compete for a spot on the team with Alex Presley, another left-handed hitting outfielder. Rasmus's contract was purchased by the Orioles on March 29, 2018. He was placed on the 10-day disabled list on April 7, and he was transferred to the 60-day disabled list on June 11. He was activated on June 21 and returned to the starting lineup that night as Baltimore faced Max Scherzer and the Washington Nationals. Rasmus hit a solo home run off of Scherzer in his first at-bat back after being activated from the DL. On July 3, Rasmus yet again decided to step away from baseball, and was placed on the restricted list.

== Personal life ==
Rasmus and his wife Megan have five children, and they reside in Franklin, Tennessee. Rasmus has three brothers, Cory, Casey, and Cyle. Cory is a pitcher who is retired, and Casey was a catcher in the St. Louis Cardinals' organization who, in 2014, retired unexpectedly at the age of 24 after a season in which he took two leaves of absence.

== See also ==
- List of Major League Baseball postseason records
- St. Louis Cardinals award winners and league leaders
