= Kasey Kiker =

American baseball player

- Pitcher
- Born: November 19, 1987 (age 38); Phenix City, Alabama, U.S.
- Bats: Left Throws: Left
- Stats at Baseball Reference
Medals
Men's baseball
Representing United States
Baseball World Cup
Gold medal – first place	2009 Nettuno	National team

Kasey William Kiker (born November 19, 1987) is an American former Minor League Baseball pitcher. He was selected by the Texas Rangers in the first round (12th overall) in the 2006 Major League Baseball draft. Kiker was also a pitcher for the USA during the 2009 Baseball World Cup.

A top prospect at one time, Kiker struggled in the minor leagues and was released by the Rangers in 2011.
