= Russell County School District =

School district in Alabama, United States

Address
- 506 14th Street Phenix City, Alabama, 36867; United States

District information
- Type: Public
- Grades: PreK–12
- NCES District ID: 0102880

Students and staff
- Students: 3,519
- Teachers: 194.0
- Staff: 141.78
- Student–teacher ratio: 18.14

Other information
- Website: myrcsd.org

Russell County School District is a school district in Russell County, Alabama.

The District includes:

- Mt. Olive Primary School
- Dixie Elementary School
- Ladonia Elementary School
- Oliver Elementary School
- Mt. Olive Intermediate School
- Russell County Middle School
- Russell County High School

== Notable alumni ==
- Colby Rasmus, Major League Baseball outfielder for the Tampa Bay Rays
- Cory Rasmus, Major League Baseball relief pitcher
