= Alabama State Route 165 =

State highway in Alabama, United States

State Route 165

Route information
- Maintained by ALDOT
- Length: 32.5 mi (52.3 km)

Major junctions
- North end: US 431 near Phenix City
- SR 208 in Cottonton
- South end: US 431 near Eufaula

Location
- Country: United States
- State: Alabama
- Counties: Barbour, Russell

Highway system
- Alabama State Highway System; Interstate; US; State
| ← I-165 | → SR 166 |

State Route 165 (SR 165) is a state highway in the U.S. state of Alabama. It runs through Holy Trinity, Alabama in the eastern part of the state. Its northern terminus is at U.S. Route 431 (US 431) south of Phenix City, Alabama, and its southern terminus is at US 431 5 miles (8.0 km) north of Eufaula, Alabama.

== Route description ==
SR 165 begins at US 431 in Barbour County before heading north past the junction with SR 285, which leads to Lakepoint State Park. It travels near Eufaula National Wildlife Refuge before it enters Russell County and intersects SR 208 near Cottonton. SR 165 then goes through Holy Trinity and Fort Mitchell as it goes near the Fort Mitchell National Cemetery and terminates at US 431 near the Columbus, Georgia metropolitan area.

While a rural highway, traffic counts are quite high due to MeadWestvaco operations at Cottonton, and because it is a frequent route for tourists headed to the Florida Gulf Coast.

== Major intersections ==
| County | Location | mi | km | Destinations | Notes |
|---|---|---|---|---|---|
| Barbour | | 0.0 | 0.0 | US 431 (SR 1) – Eufaula, Phenix City | Southern terminus |
| Barbour | | 1.8 | 2.9 | SR 285 south (Old Highway 165) – Lakepoint State Park | Northern terminus of SR 285 |
| Russell | Cottonton | 11.6 | 18.7 | SR 208 east (Omaha Road) / CR 4 west (Cottonton Road) | Western terminus of SR 208 |
| Russell | | 15.7 | 25.3 | CR 50 east (Bluff Creek Road) – Bluff Creek Campground | |
| Russell | Holy Trinity | 18.0 | 29.0 | CR 54 east (Terminal Road) | |
| Russell | Fort Mitchell | 21.5 | 34.6 | CR 18 (Owens Road/Oswichee Road) – Seale | |
| Russell | Fort Mitchell | 22.4 | 36.0 | CR 73 west (Sweetwater Branch Road) | |
| Russell | Fort Mitchell | 23.9 | 38.5 | CR 24 west (Bradley Road) | |
| Russell | | 28.9 | 46.5 | CR 39 south (Nuckols Road) – Pittsview | |
| Russell | | 32.5 | 52.3 | US 431 (SR 1) – Eufaula, Phenix City | Northern terminus |
1.000 mi = 1.609 km; 1.000 km = 0.621 mi
