= Alabama State Route 285 =

State highway in Alabama, United States

State Route 285
- Old Highway 165

Route information
- Maintained by ALDOT
- Length: 1.293 mi (2.081 km)

Major junctions
- South end: US 431 at Lakepoint State Park
- North end: SR 165 north of Wylaunee

Location
- Country: United States
- State: Alabama
- Counties: Barbour

Highway system
- Alabama State Highway System; Interstate; US; State
← SR 283	→ SR 287

State Route 285 (SR 285) is a 1.293-mile-long (2.081 km) route that serves as a connection between US 431 at Lakepoint State Park to SR 165 north of Wylaunee in eastern Barbour County. The entire route is known as Old Highway 165 for its entire length, as it is a former alignment of SR 165.

== Route description ==
The southern terminus of SR 285 is located at its intersection with US 431 at Lakepoint State Park. From this point the route travels in an easterly direction prior to turning to the northeast en route to its northern terminus at SR 165.

== Major intersections ==
The entire route is in Barbour County.

Location	mi	km	Destinations	Notes
Lakepoint State Park	0.000	0.000	US 431 (SR 1) – Eufaula, Phenix City	Southern terminus
	1.293	2.081	SR 165	Northern terminus
1.000 mi = 1.609 km; 1.000 km = 0.621 mi
