= Apalachicola Fort Site =

Archaeological site in Alabama, United States

- Apalachicola Fort
- U.S. National Register of Historic Places
- U.S. National Historic Landmark
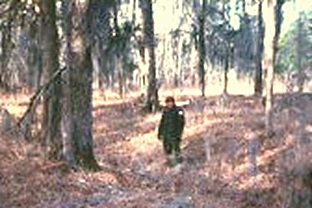
- Apalachicola Fort Site

- Location within Alabama
- Nearest city: Holy Trinity, Alabama
- Built: 1689
- NRHP reference No.: 66000931

Significant dates
- Added to NRHP: October 15, 1966
- Designated NHL: July 19, 1964

The Apalachicola Fort Site is an archaeological site near Holy Trinity, Alabama, United States. Spain established a wattle and daub blockhouse here on the Chattahoochee River in 1690 in an attempt to maintain influence among the people of the Apalachicola Province. Abandoned after about one year of use and rediscovered in 1956, it was investigated by archaeologists and is now owned by the county. It is not open to the public. It was declared a National Historic Landmark in 1964.

== Setting ==
The Apalachicola Fort Site is located in a rural setting in eastern Russell County, Alabama, on a bluff overlooking the Chattahoochee River a few miles from the Holy Trinity monastery. The site was chosen by the Spanish governor of La Florida, Don Diego De Quiroga y Losada, for its proximity to Apalachicola, the principal town of the Lower Creeks. The fort site measures about 72 feet (22 m) across, encompassing the site of a bastioned blockhouse surrounded by a wooden palisade and dry moat.

== History ==
The Spanish governor was concerned over the encroachment of English traders from the Province of Carolina into Spanish territory, where they provided local Native Americans with a broader selection and higher quality of trade goods than Spanish traders did. This fort was built in an attempt to extend Spanish influence into the northernmost reaches of its claimed territory. The effect of the constructing the fort was that the local Creeks, instead of staying with the Spanish, migrated to English-controlled areas. This move undermined the purpose of the fort, which was already encumbered by a long supply line. It was consequently abandoned after just one year of use, and largely demolished by the Spanish prior to their departure.

Although the Creek village was later reoccupied, the Creeks were forced out of the area in the 19th century by American Indian removal policy. The site lay abandoned and unknown until 1956, when archaeologists and one of the monastery's monks worked to locate the site from the few surviving records. Subsequent archaeological digs confirmed the find, and led to its designation as a National Historic Landmark. The site, located on privately held farmland, was turned over to the county in 1971. It is not open to the public.

== See also ==
- List of National Historic Landmarks in Alabama
- National Register of Historic Places listings in Russell County, Alabama
