= Matthew Leonard =

American Vietnam War participant (1929–1967)

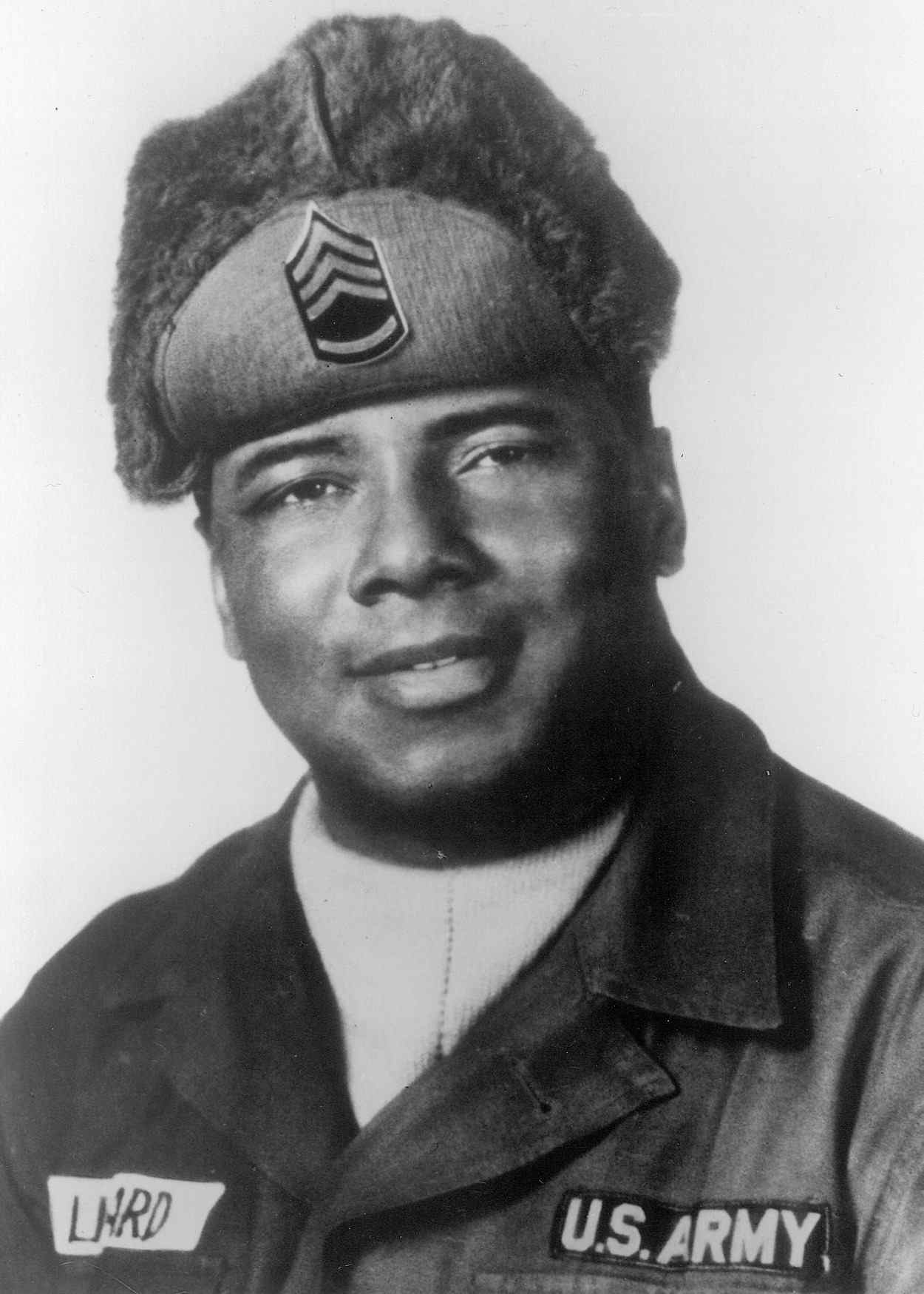
- Matthew Leonard, Medal of Honor recipient
- Born: November 26, 1929; Eutaw, Alabama, U.S.
- Died: February 28, 1967 (aged 37) near Suoi Da, Republic of Vietnam
- Burial place: Fort Mitchell National Cemetery Fort Mitchell, Alabama
- Military career
- Allegiance: United States of America
- Branch: United States Army
- Service years: 1947–1967
- Rank: Sergeant First Class
- Units: 16th Infantry Regiment, 1st Infantry Division
- Conflicts: Korean War; Vietnam War †
- Awards: Medal of Honor; Purple Heart

Matthew Leonard (November 26, 1929 – February 28, 1967) was a United States Army sergeant who posthumously received America's highest military decoration—the Medal of Honor—for his actions in the Vietnam War.

== Biography ==
Leonard was born in Eutaw, Alabama. He married his elementary school sweetheart, Lois, and they had five children.

Matthew Leonard entered the Army from Birmingham, Alabama in 1947. He served in both the Korean and Vietnam Wars. On February 28, 1967, Leonard was serving as a platoon sergeant with Company B, 1st Battalion, 16th Infantry, 1st Infantry Division, near Suoi Da, South Vietnam. When his platoon came under attack. Sergeant Leonard organized the defense and encouraged his men. Despite suffering several wounds, he continued to command and eventually charged an enemy machine gun. He was wounded once more during the charge, and died soon after.

For his actions on that day, Sergeant Leonard received the Medal of Honor. Leonard's widow Lois and her family were presented with his Medal of Honor by Secretary of the Army Stanley Rogers Resor during a ceremony at the Pentagon on December 19, 1968.

Matthew Leonard is buried in Fort Mitchell, Alabama's National Cemetery.

== Medal of Honor citation ==
Sergeant Leonard's official Medal of Honor citation reads:

For conspicuous gallantry and intrepidity in action at the risk of his life above and beyond the call of duty. His platoon was suddenly attacked by a large enemy force employing small arms, automatic weapons, and hand grenades. Although the platoon leader and several other key leaders were among the first wounded, P/Sgt. Leonard quickly rallied his men to throw back the initial enemy assaults. During the short pause that followed, he organized a defensive perimeter, redistributed ammunition, and inspired his comrades through his forceful leadership and words of encouragement. Noticing a wounded companion outside the perimeter, he dragged the man to safety but was struck by a sniper's bullet which shattered his left hand. Refusing medical attention and continuously exposing himself to the increasing fire as the enemy again assaulted the perimeter, P/Sgt. Leonard moved from position to position to direct the fire of his men against the well camouflaged foe. Under the cover of the main attack, the enemy moved a machine gun into a location where it could sweep the entire perimeter. This threat was magnified when the platoon machine gun in this area malfunctioned. P/Sgt. Leonard quickly crawled to the gun position and was helping to clear the malfunction when the gunner and other men in the vicinity were wounded by fire from the enemy machine gun. P/Sgt. Leonard rose to his feet, charged the enemy gun and destroyed the hostile crew despite being hit several times by enemy fire. He moved to a tree, propped himself against it, and continued to engage the enemy until he succumbed to his many wounds. His fighting spirit, heroic leadership, and valiant acts inspired the remaining members of his platoon to hold back the enemy until assistance arrived. Sgt. Leonard's profound courage and devotion to his men are in keeping with the highest traditions of the military service, and his gallant actions reflect great credit upon himself and the U.S. Army.

== See also ==
- List of Medal of Honor recipients
- List of Medal of Honor recipients for the Vietnam War
