= Sandfort, Alabama =

- Unincorporated community
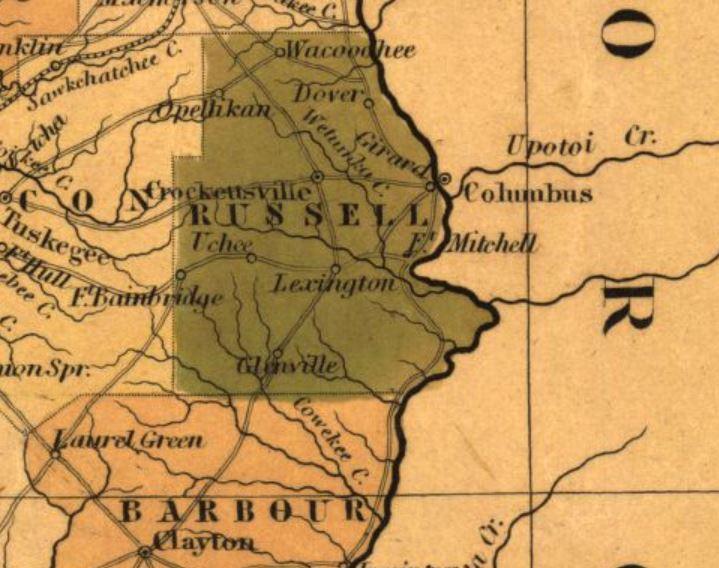
- Henry Schenck Tanner's 1841 map showing Lexington (Sandfort) located along the Federal Road

- Location within Alabama Location within the United States
- Coordinates: 32°20′17″N 85°13′23″W
- Country: United States
- State: Alabama
- County: Russell
- Elevation: 505 ft (154 m)
- Time zone: UTC-6 (Central (CST))
  - Summer (DST): UTC-5 (CDT)
- Area code: Area code 334
- GNIS feature ID: 158079

Sandfort, also rendered Sand Fort or Sanfort and also known as Lexington, is an unincorporated community in Russell County, Alabama, United States.

== History ==
The community was named for a fort built on the Federal Road, which was constructed ten miles west of Fort Mitchell and six miles northwest of Seale. Sandfort was one of the earliest settled areas of Russell County and home to one of the earliest post offices in the county. A post office operated under the name Sandfort from 1840 to 1866, with Robert Allen serving as the first postmaster. A Mr. Royston operated Royston's Inn in Sandfort, which became a stop on the Federal Road. During the Creek War of 1836, Mr. Royston was held captive in his store by hostile Creeks for two weeks.

=== Sand Fort ===
The Sand Fort was constructed along the Federal Road and named for the sandy soil used in its construction. Sources differ on when it was constructed, with some reporting it was built by General John Floyd and the Georgia Militia he commanded in 1814 as a rendezvous and supply depot during the Creek War, while others conclude it was constructed during the Creek War of 1836 by General Thomas Jesup or General Winfield Scott to provide protection to local settlers.

The fort site was eventually destroyed by farming. No evidence of the fort exists today.
