= Asbury Manual Labor School =

Coordinates: 32.3458°N 85.0235°W

Asbury Manual Labor School was an American Indian boarding school near Fort Mitchell, Alabama. Founded by the United Methodist Church, and named for Francis Asbury, it opened in 1822 and closed in 1830, when the Creek were forcibly removed to Oklahoma.

== History ==
Fort Mitchell was a military fort and then a trading post, built in 1813, while the Creek War was going on. The reverend William Capers was sent there by the United Methodist Church to missionize among the Creek. Negotiations with the local chiefs led to his opening the Asbury Manual Labor School and Mission in 1822, one mile north of Fort Mitchell near Coweta, an Indian village; Creek children were to learn how to read and write and acquire other skills. The reverend Isaac Smith was the first teacher, and worked there until he retired in 1829; when the school opened it had a dozen students, and would average between 35 and 50 students. It quickly got three teachers and a 25-acre farm. It closed in 1830, when the Creek were forcibly removed to Oklahoma. One notable student was Samuel Checote.

Nothing remains of the school; the location is a United Methodist Landmark, and there is a historical marker "at the entrance to the Fort Mitchell Park", next to Fort Mitchell National Cemetery. The archives of Columbus State University in Georgia holds a founding document (the agreement between Capers and the Creek chiefs) and a booklet, Asbury Manual Labor School-Asbury Mission School; Lost pages from Methodism's Story by Marynell S. Waite.
