= Alabama State Route 208 =

Highway in Alabama

State Route 208
- Omaha Road

Route information
- Maintained by ALDOT
- Length: 0.839 mi (1,350 m)

Major junctions
- West end: SR 165 in Cottonton
- East end: SR 39 Spur at the Georgia state line near Omaha, GA

Location
- Country: United States
- State: Alabama
- Counties: Russell

Highway system
- Alabama State Highway System; Interstate; US; State
← SR 207	→ SR 210

State Route 208 (SR 208) is a .839-mile (1.350 km), west–east route that serves as a connector between SR 165 and the bridge across the Chattahoochee River at Cottonton, the only bridge across the river between Phenix City and Eufaula. From its western terminus, the route continues east into Georgia as Georgia State Route 39 Spur (SR 39 Spur).

== Route description ==
SR 208 begins at an intersection with SR 165 in Cottonton, heading southeast on two-lane undivided Omaha Road through woodland. The route comes to a bridge over the Chattahoochee River, where it continues into Georgia as SR 39 Spur.

== Major intersections ==
The entire route is in Cottonton, Russell County.

mi	km	Destinations	Notes
0.000	0.000	SR 165 – Eufaula, Fort Mitchell	Western terminus
0.839	1.350	SR 39 Spur east to SR 39 – Omaha	Eastern terminus; Georgia state line
1.000 mi = 1.609 km; 1.000 km = 0.621 mi
