= Lake Eufaula =

Lake Eufaula may refer to:

- Lake Eufaula (Oklahoma), an artificial lake on the Canadian River in Oklahoma, USA
- Walter F. George Lake, an artificial lake on the Chattahoochee River between Alabama and Georgia, USA, also known as Lake Eufaula, from the town of Eufaula, Alabama on its western bank
