= Cottonton, Alabama =

Cottonton
- Unincorporated community
- Location within Alabama Location within the United States
- Coordinates: 32°08′49″N 85°04′26″W
- Country: United States
- State: Alabama
- County: Russell
- Elevation: 220 ft (67 m)

Population
  - Total: 136
- Time zone: UTC-6 (Central (CST))
  - Summer (DST): UTC-5 (CDT)
- ZIP code: 36851
- Area code: 334
- GNIS feature ID: 116693

Cottonton is an unincorporated community in Russell County, Alabama, United States.

== Geography ==
Cottonton is located in southeastern Russell County along the Chattahoochee River, which is also the Georgia state line, at 32° 8′ 49″ N, 85° 4′ 26″ W (32.146944, -85.073889). Alabama State Routes 165 and 208 meet in the community. AL-165 leads north 26 mi (42 km) to Phenix City, the Russell County seat, and south 21 mi (34 km) to Eufaula (via a connection with U.S. Route 431). AL-208 serves as a connector route less than a mile in length that runs east of AL-165 to Georgia State Route 39 Spur across the Chattahoochee River. West of AL-165, the road continues as Russell County Highway 4, leading roughly 8 mi (13 km) to Pittsview and U.S. Highway 431.

== Notable person ==
- J. C. Hartman, former Major League Baseball player

== Climate ==
The climate in this area is characterized by hot, humid summers and generally mild to cool winters. According to the Köppen Climate Classification system, Cottonton has a humid subtropical climate, abbreviated "Cfa" on climate maps.

== Post office ==
Cottonton has a post office with ZIP code 36851.

== Gallery ==
Below are photographs taken in Cottonton as part of the Historic American Buildings Survey:

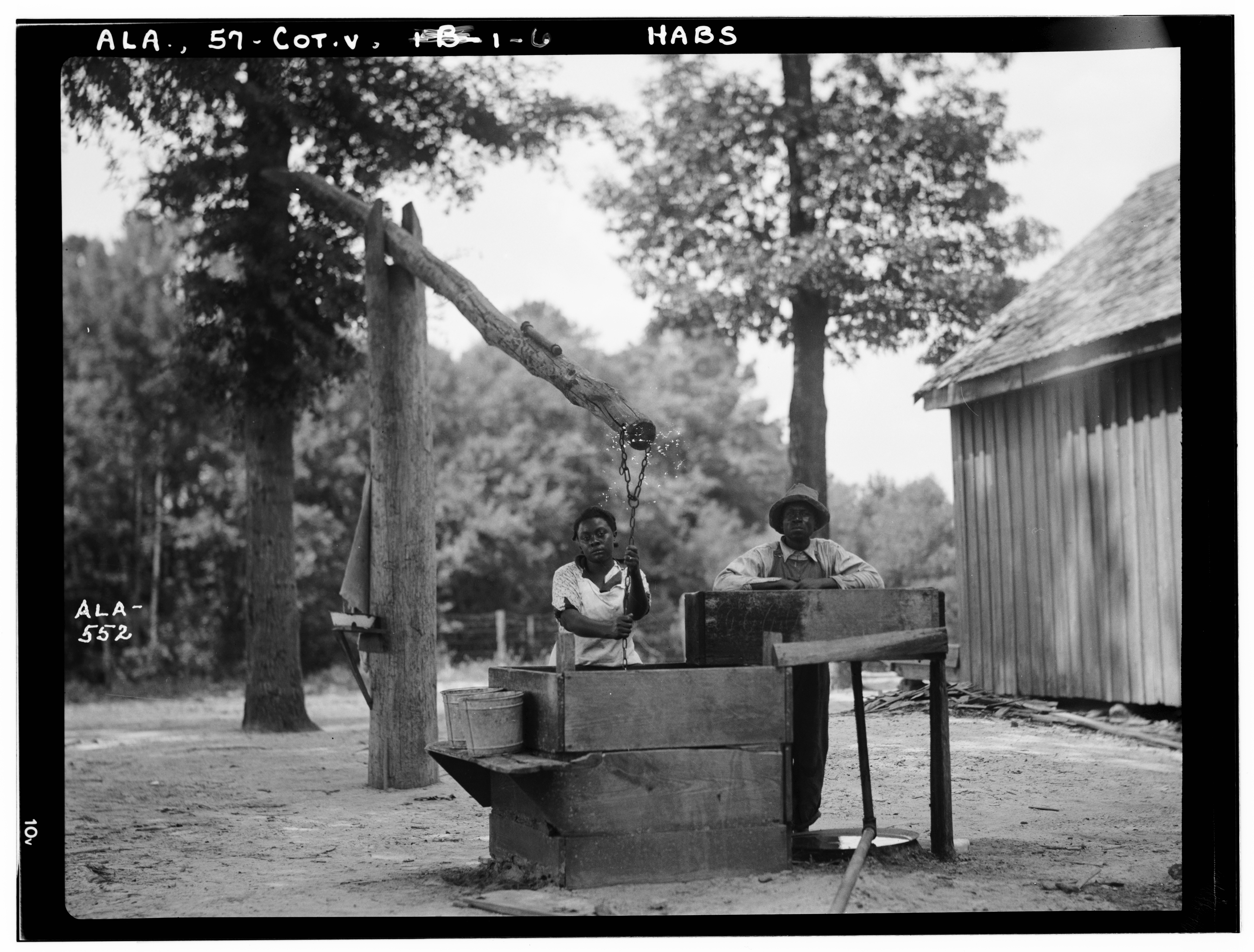
Well sweep, Cliatt Plantation

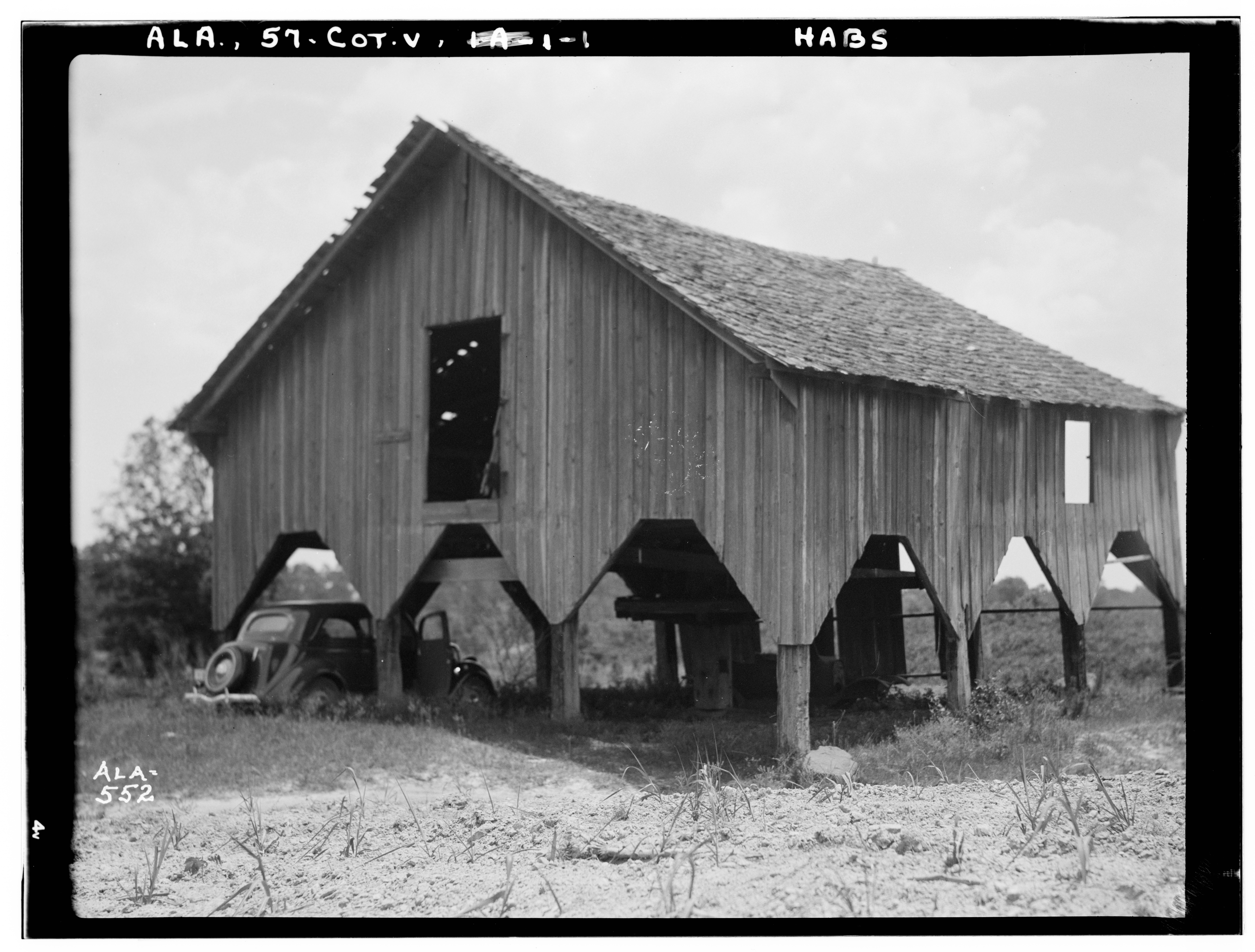
Old mule gin house, Cliatt Plantation
