= Fort Mitchell Historic Site =

Archaeological site in Alabama, United States

- Fort Mitchell Site
- U.S. National Register of Historic Places
- U.S. National Historic Landmark
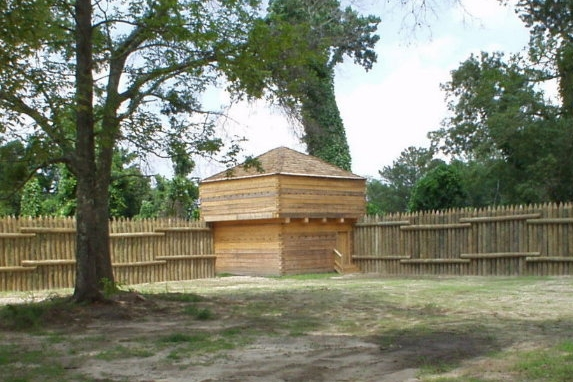
- A reconstruction of the stockade and a blockhouse.

- Location within Alabama
- Nearest city: Fort Mitchell, Alabama
- Coordinates: 32°21′07″N 85°01′18″W
- Built: 1813
- NRHP reference No.: 72000178

Significant dates
- Added to NRHP: June 13, 1972
- Designated NHL: June 21, 1990

Fort Mitchell Historic Site is a park and an archaeological site in Fort Mitchell, Alabama, that was declared a National Historic Landmark in 1990. The park features a reconstruction of the 1813 stockade fort that was an important United States military post in the Creek War, a museum with exhibits about the fort's history, and a collection of historic carriages, a restored 19th-century log home, and a visitor center.

The Chattahoochee Indian Heritage Center has a ceremonial flame memorial to the Creek nation. Interpretive panels recount the history of the Creek War of 1836 and the subsequent forced removal of the Creek peoples along the Trail of Tears. The memorial is located adjacent to Fort Mitchell Historic Site.

The site also features historic burial grounds.

== History ==
Fort Mitchell Historic Site represents three different periods of relationships of the Creek nation with the United States. The first Fort Mitchell, built in 1813 as an outpost during the Creek War and War of 1812, represents the military aspect of Manifest Destiny. It was named for David Brydie Mitchell, a governor of Georgia. The United States defeated the Red Sticks of the Creek Indian Nation, who comprised the majority of the population and had opposed American expansion in their territory. The Creek in defeat were forced to cede 21 million acres 85,000 km^{2}) of land in 1814 in Georgia and Alabama, affecting the Lower and the Upper Towns.

The second represents the Indian Factory, a trading post staffed by the assistant US Indian agent appointed by the government beginning in 1817, when the post was transferred from Fort Hawkins in Georgia. The trading factory operated until about 1820. A post office was operated here from 1818 to 1820 as well.

In 1821 Col. John Crowell was appointed by US President James Madison as US Indian agent to the Creek, to replace David Brydie Mitchell, who was pushed out for a scandal related to illegal smuggling of African slaves. John's brothers Thomas and Henry Crowell accompanied him to set up the agency. By 1825, Thomas was operating a tavern near the fort. That year, the US Army rebuilt the fort and staffed it with a garrison of the Fourth Infantry relocated from Cantonment Oglethorpe in 1829, until 1840, after Indian Removal of the late 1830s.

The last period represents the Federal government's attempt to live up to its treaty obligations, including payment of annuities and supplies, recognition of sovereignty and other elements since the 19th century. Fort Mitchell was garrisoned during the Second Creek War (1836), which occurred in Alabama as the state tried to regulate Creek land allotments and freedom. After this, most Creek in Alabama were forcibly relocated to Indian Territory. Those who stayed in the state had to give up tribal membership; they were considered state and US citizens.

In 1971 professional archeological excavations were undertaken at the former fort, of which only ruins remained. Among the findings were gravesites, remains of a hospital, the old fort, outbuildings, offices, barracks, and storage rooms. The Alabama Archaeological Association published a 1974 report. In 1990 the site was designated as a National Historic Landmark.

In 1987 the Department of Defense established the Fort Mitchell National Cemetery on this site for interment of United States veterans from the Southeast and Gulf Coast.

== Gallery ==
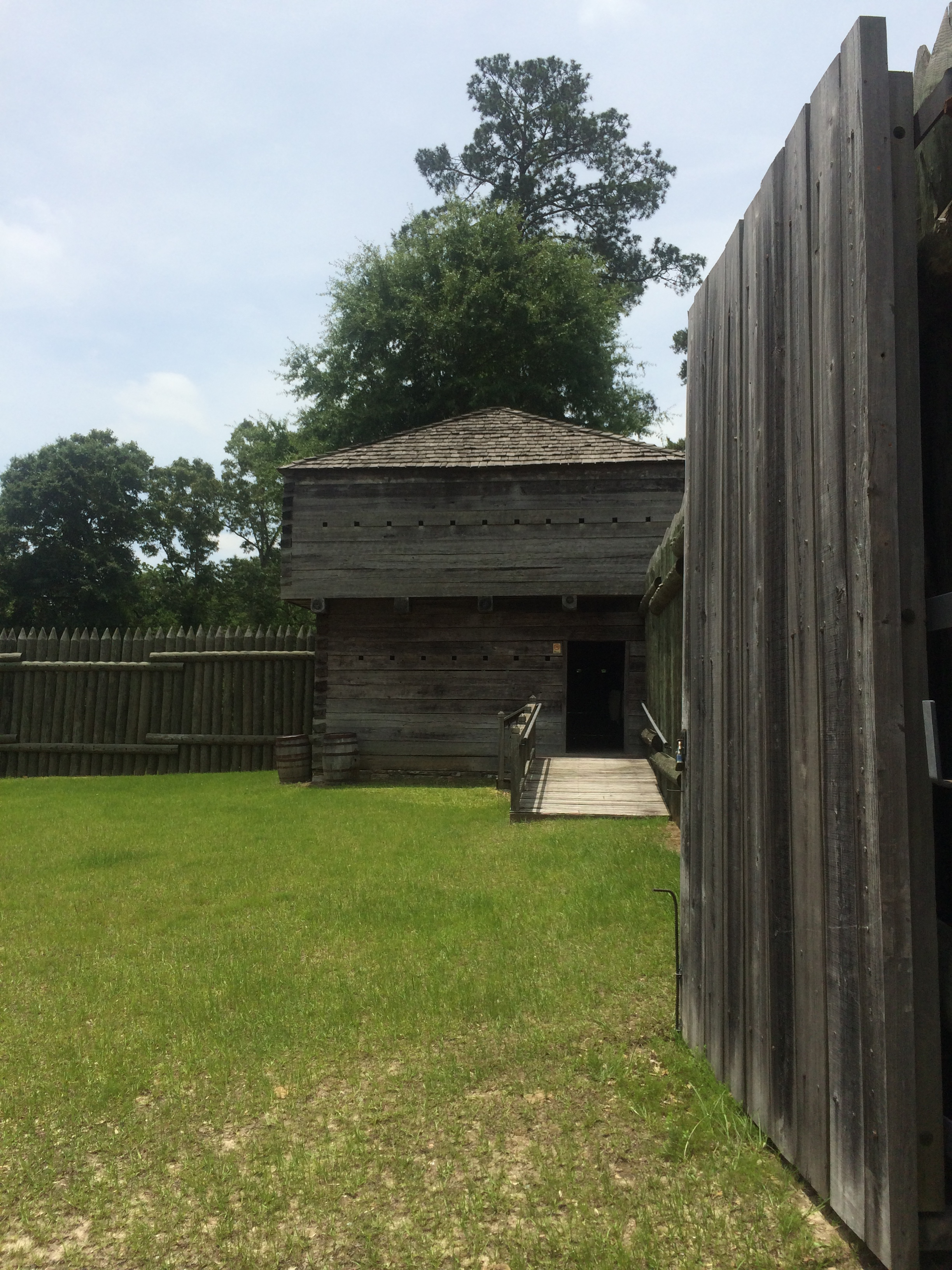
A blockhouse at one corner of the Fort Mitchell stockade.

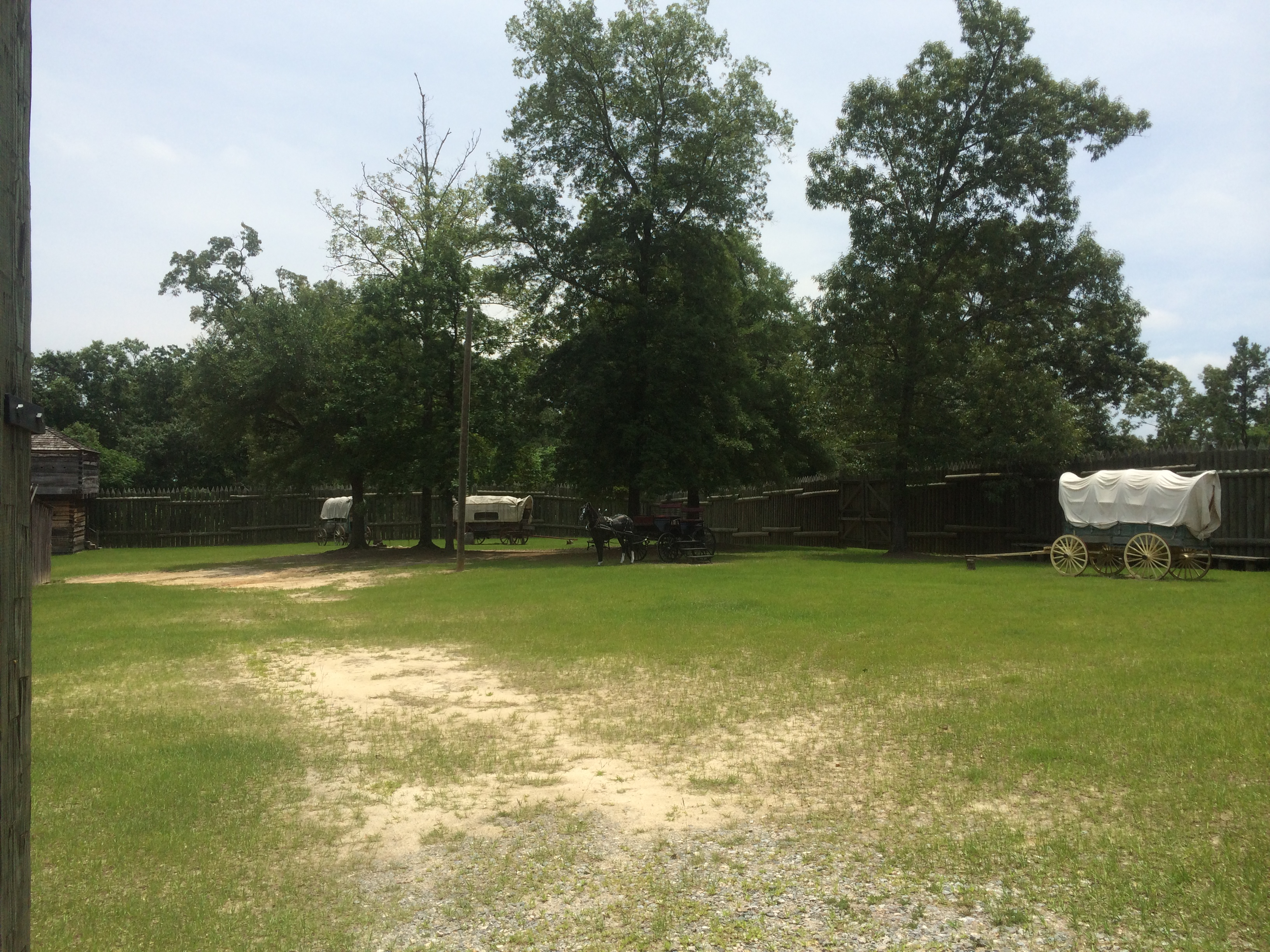
Inside the Fort Mitchell stockade.

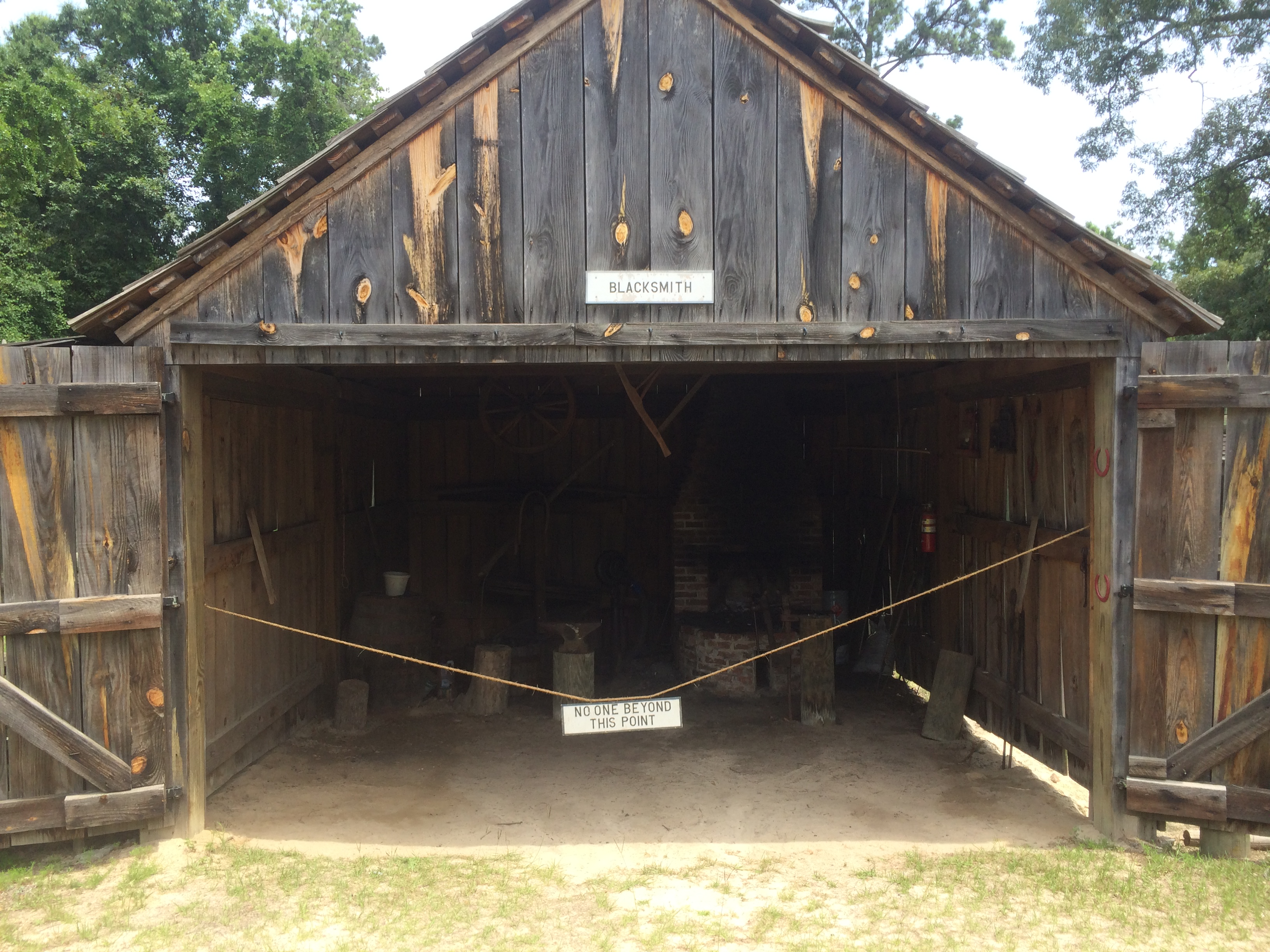
Blacksmith shop inside the Fort Mitchell stockade. Historical demonstrations are periodically presented.

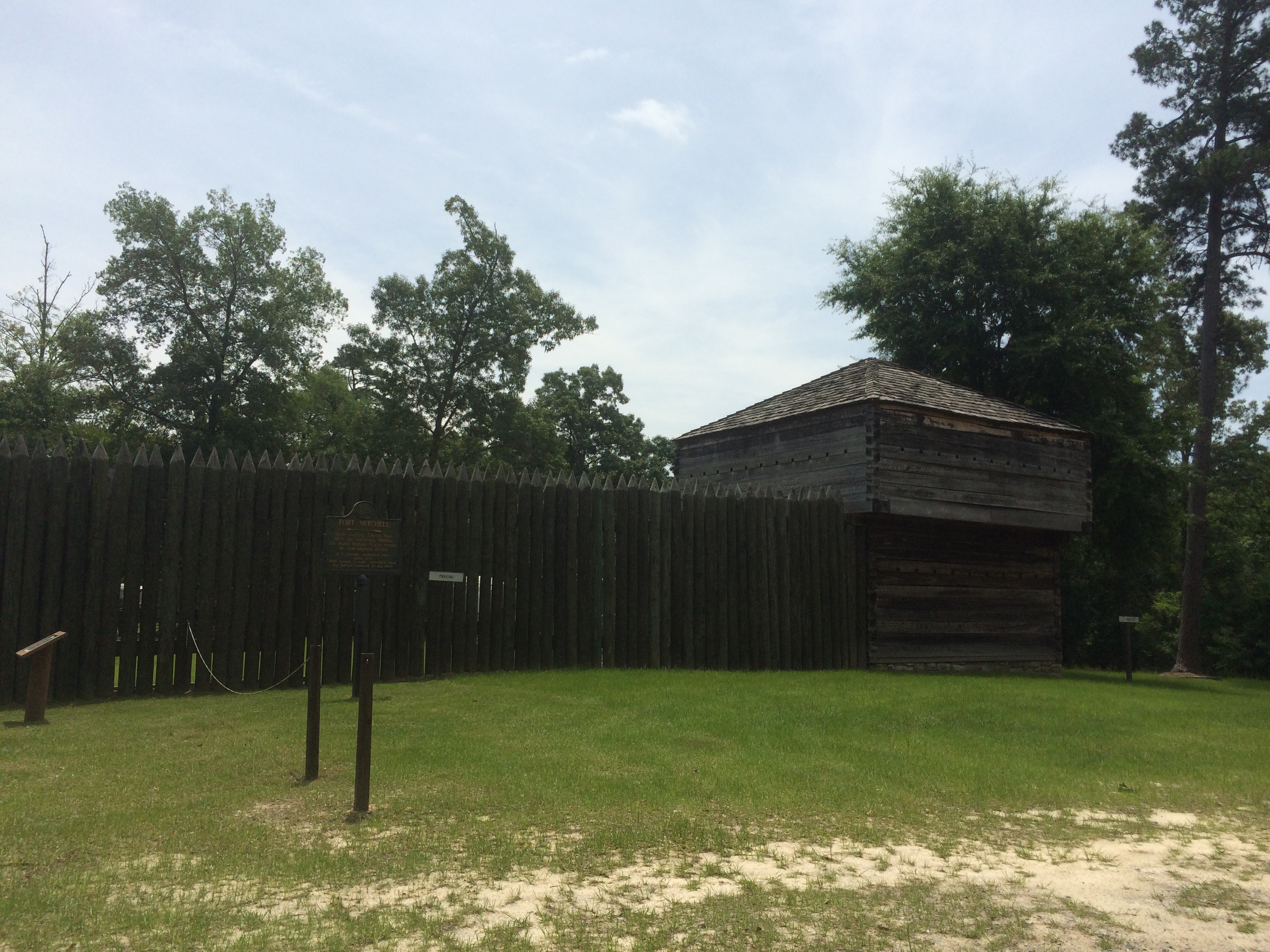
Exterior of the Fort Mitchell stockade.

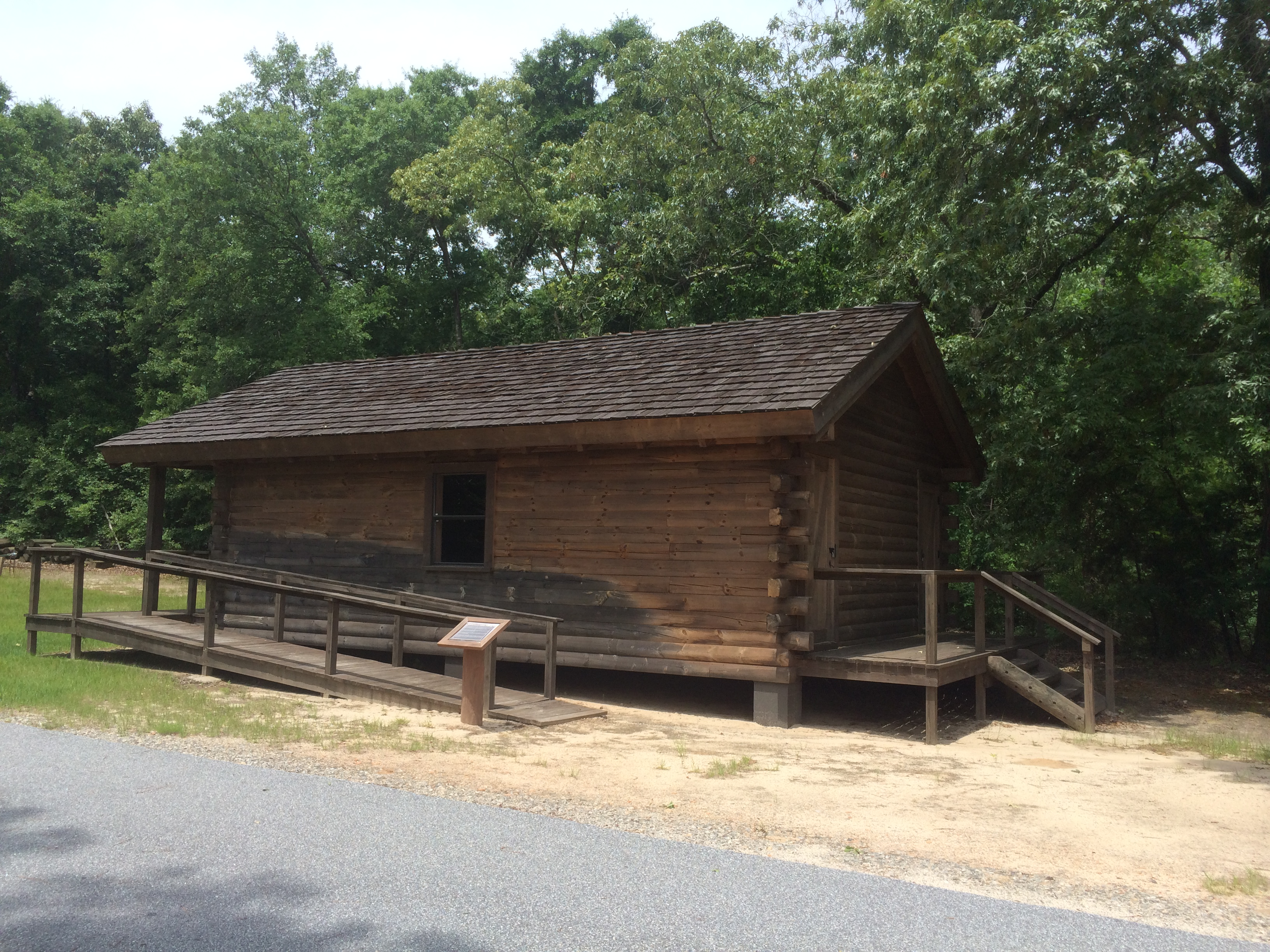
Reconstructed Indian trading post outside of the Fort Mitchell stockade.

== See also ==
- List of National Historic Landmarks in Alabama
- Fort Mitchell National Cemetery
