= Holy Trinity, Alabama =

- Unincorporated community
- Location within the state of Alabama Holy Trinity, Alabama (the United States)
- Coordinates: 32°13′21″N 85°0′19″W
- Country: United States
- State: Alabama
- County: Russell
- Time zone: UTC-8 (Central (CST))
  - Summer (DST): UTC-7 (CDT)
- ZIP code: 36859

Holy Trinity is an unincorporated community in Russell County, Alabama, United States. It is about 20 miles south of Columbus, Georgia, on State Route 165 and is the location of Apalachicola Fort Site, a National Historic Landmark.

== Features ==
The Catholic religious institutes of the Missionary Servants of the Most Holy Trinity (priests and Brothers) and the Missionary Servants of the Most Blessed Trinity (Sisters) were founded in Holy Trinity in 1928. It is also home to Saint Joseph Parish and the Blessed Trinity Shrine, a retreat center.

A post office was located in the community, but it was closed on January 31, 1976.
