= Wende, Alabama =

- Unincorporated community
- Location within Alabama Location within the United States
- Coordinates: 32°15′28″N 85°20′22″W
- Country: United States
- State: Alabama
- County: Russell
- Elevation: 351 ft (107 m)
- Time zone: UTC-6 (Central (CST))
  - Summer (DST): UTC-5 (CDT)
- Area code: 334
- GNIS feature ID: 157233

Wende (also Althea, Blackmons Crossing) is an unincorporated community in Russell County, Alabama, United States.
