= Oketeyeconne, Georgia =

Oketeyeconne, Georgia Oketeyeconne Community
- Ghost town
- Location within Georgia Location within the United States
- Coordinates: Community 31°38′35″N 85°04′50″W
- Country: United States
- State: Georgia
- County: Clay
- Elevation: 200 ft (61 m)
- Time zone: UTC-5 (Eastern (EST))
  - Summer (DST): UTC-4 (EDT)

Oketeyeconne was an unincorporated community in Clay County, Georgia, United States, which was located along the Chattahoochee River. Following legislation of the late 1940s, the United States Army Corps of Engineers constructed major dam and reservoir projects on the river. The manmade 46,000-acre Walter F. George Lake was developed north of the dam by the same name. Its construction and flooding required the evacuation of Oketeyeconne and its residents were forced to relocate elsewhere. The lake opened for use in 1963.

== Geography ==
Oketeyeconne's latitude is 31.6432225 and its longitude is -85.0804849. The town was flooded to create Walter F. George Lake. It now lies under 90+ feet of water. It can be found with a depth finder by boat.

== History ==
Archeologists have found evidence that earlier cultures of indigenous peoples have lived along the river since 1000 BC. Oketeyeconne was known historically as a Hitchiti-speaking town of the Lower Creek tribe in the late 1700s. It was the most southern of major towns affiliated with the Lower Creek, who ranged to the north. To the south were the Sawokli, Tamathli, Apalachicola, Yamasee, Mikasuki, and Seminole peoples.

In 1799 Benjamin Hawkins, the United States Superintendent for Indian Affairs south of the Ohio River, described the settlement as being "a nice town settled on good land with room for livestock". He was encouraging Native Americans of the Southeast to adopt European-American farming techniques, and lived among the Creek.

Due to white settlers' encroaching on their territory, the Indian citizens of Oketeyeconne became disgruntled over food shortages and land seizure in the early 1800s. After the Creek Wars resulted in refugees coming into the area following defeat at Horseshoe Bend by Andrew Jackson of the United States Army, they appealed to the British for help in 1813. They had longstanding trading ties with the British dating to before the American Revolutionary War. The British tried to capitalize on Native American interests to attract allies during the War of 1812 with the United States. At this time, some whites believed that Native Americans of the area were acting as spies for British forces. The British considered the Chattahoochee to provide a possible invasion route, via the Apalachicola River, from Florida on the Gulf of Mexico.

During the Civil War, the residents of Oketeyeconne were divided in their affiliations, siding with both the CSA and the Union. The majority of the town's residents were Native Americans, descendants of people who had evaded Indian Removal of the 1830s, or agreed to become state citizens in exchange for being allowed to stay. The Muskogee-speaking Creek Confederation citizens sided with the Union during the war. Descendants of Seminole and other tribes historically affected by the Seminole Wars tended to side with the Confederacy.

The town remained unincorporated. During the mid-twentieth century, it was evacuated when the federal government took it over for development of water control and navigation projects on the river. Following legislation of the late 1940s, the United States Army Corps of Engineers constructed major dam and reservoir projects on the river. The manmade, 46,000-acre Walter F. George Lake was developed north of the dam by the same name. Its construction and flooding required the evacuation of Oketeyeconne. The lake opened for use in 1963.

== Legacy and honors ==
- 1989, the community's Native American and War of 1812 history was told on a historical marker erected on the highway nearby.
