= Jernigan, Alabama =

- Unincorporated community
- Location within Alabama Location within the United States
- Coordinates: 32°07′35″N 85°04′20″W
- Country: United States
- State: Alabama
- County: Russell
- Elevation: 302 ft (92 m)
- Time zone: UTC-6 (Central (CST))
  - Summer (DST): UTC-5 (CDT)
- Area code: 334
- GNIS feature ID: 120862

Jernigan is an unincorporated community in Russell County, Alabama, United States.

== History ==
A post office operated under the name Jernigan from 1876 to 1907.

Jernigan was planned to be the southern terminus of a proposed branch of the Alabama, Georgia, and Florida Railway.
