= Hooks, Alabama =

- Unincorporated community
- Location within Alabama Location within the United States
- Coordinates: 32°11′31″N 85°13′57″W
- Country: United States
- State: Alabama
- County: Russell
- Elevation: 322 ft (98 m)
- Time zone: UTC-6 (Central (CST))
  - Summer (DST): UTC-5 (CDT)
- Area code: 334

Hooks is an unincorporated community in Russell County, Alabama, United States.

== History ==
Hooks was named after John J. Hooks, the first postmaster. The post office was established in 1893, and remained in operation until it was discontinued in 1915.
