= Russell County, Alabama =

County in Alabama, United States

- County
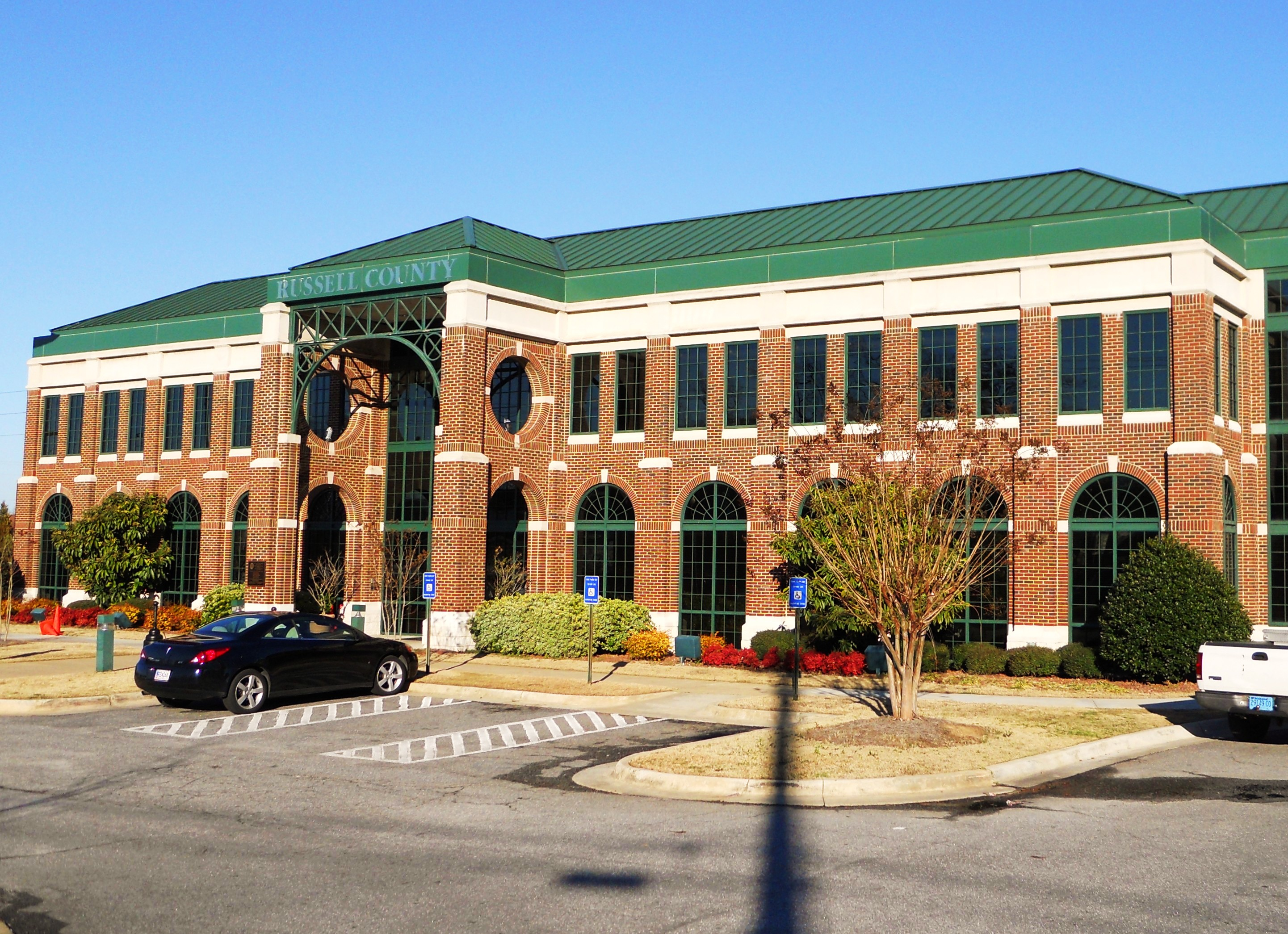
- County courthouse in Phenix City

- Seal

- Location within the U.S. state of Alabama
- Coordinates: 32°17′12″N 85°11′38″W
- Country: United States
- State: Alabama
- Founded: December 18, 1832
- Named for: Gilbert C. Russell
- Seat: Phenix City
- Largest city: Phenix City

Area
  - Total: 647 sq mi (1,680 km^{2})
  - Land: 641 sq mi (1,660 km^{2})
  - Water: 6.1 sq mi (16 km^{2}) 0.9%

Population (2020)
  - Total: 59,183
  - Estimate (2025): 58,898 ▼
  - Density: 92.3/sq mi (35.6/km^{2})
- Time zone: UTC−6 (Central)
  - Summer (DST): UTC−5 (CDT)
- Congressional district: 2nd
- Website: russellcountyal.gov
- County Number 57 on Alabama Licence Plates; Officially in Central Time, but Phenix City unofficially uses Eastern Time

Russell County is the easternmost county in the U.S. state of Alabama. As of the 2020 census, the population was 59,183. Its county seat is Phenix City. Its name is in honor of Colonel Gilbert C. Russell, who fought in the wars against the Creek Indians.

Russell County is part of the Columbus, GA-AL Metropolitan Statistical Area.

Of all counties in the United States, Russell County has the most people working in a state other than their own, at over 54% of the population, most of whom work in Columbus, Georgia.

== History ==
Russell County was established by an act of the state general assembly on December 18, 1832, from lands ceded to the state by the Creek Native Americans. The county seat has changed several times: Girard (1833–1839), Crawford originally Crockettsville (1839–1868), Seale (1868–1935) and Phenix City (1935–present). It was named for War of 1812, Col. Gilbert Christian Russell Sr., 1782–1861, 3rd U.S. Infantry.

In the 1940s and 1950s, Russell County and especially its county seat, Phenix City gained a reputation of lawlessness, political corruption and being a den for vice such as organized crime, prostitution, and gambling. The city police and county deputies also took part in the corruption. In 1954, the local politician Albert Patterson won the Democratic nomination for Alabama Attorney General on a platform of ridding the city of corruption and crime. Patterson ran for a state office since he was unable to run in local elections, as they were rigged. On June 18, 1954, Patterson was shot and killed by an unknown assassin. The murder set off a series of events that led to Governor Gordon Persons declaring martial law in the county and city because of its lawlessness on July 22 that year. That was the only time since the Reconstruction era that martial law was declared in a US city for reasons other than civil unrest or natural disaster. The Alabama National Guard was called in to assume the role of the police and clean up the area of illegal activities. The state of martial law was rescinded on January 17, 1955, with Russell County and Phenix City both returning to civilian control. In 1974, the New York Times noted that the campaign was very successful and led to a relatively-low crime rate in Phenix City for the 20 years since then.

== Geography ==
According to the United States Census Bureau, the county has a total area of 647 square miles (1,680 km^{2}), of which 641 square miles (1,660 km^{2}) is land and 6.1 square miles (16 km^{2}) (0.9%) is water. The county is located in the Gulf Coastal Plain region, with a few rolling hills due to its close proximity to the fall line of the eastern United States.

=== Major highways ===
- U.S. Highway 80 / State Route 8 (unsigned)
- U.S. Highway 280 / State Route 38 (unsigned)
- U.S. Highway 431 / State Route 1 (unsigned)
- State Route 26
- State Route 51
- State Route 165
- State Route 169
- State Route 208

=== Transit ===
- Phenix City Express

=== Adjacent counties ===
- Lee County (north)
- Muscogee County, Georgia (northeast/EST Border)
- Chattahoochee County, Georgia (east/EST Border)
- Stewart County, Georgia (southeast/EST Border)
- Barbour County (south)
- Bullock County (southwest)
- Macon County (northwest)

=== National protected area ===
- Eufaula National Wildlife Refuge (part)

== Demographics ==
Historical population
Census	Pop.	Note	%±
1840	13,513		—
1850	19,548		44.7%
1860	26,592		36.0%
1870	21,636		−18.6%
1880	24,837		14.8%
1890	24,093		−3.0%
1900	27,083		12.4%
1910	25,937		−4.2%
1920	27,448		5.8%
1930	27,377		−0.3%
1940	35,775		30.7%
1950	40,364		12.8%
1960	46,351		14.8%
1970	45,394		−2.1%
1980	47,356		4.3%
1990	46,860		−1.0%
2000	49,756		6.2%
2010	52,947		6.4%
2020	59,183		11.8%
2025 (est.)	58,898	▼	−0.5%
U.S. Decennial Census; 1790–1960 1900–1990; 1990–2000 2010–2020

=== 2020 census ===
As of the 2020 census, the county had a population of 59,183. The median age was 37.3 years. 24.5% of residents were under the age of 18 and 15.6% of residents were 65 years of age or older. For every 100 females there were 91.6 males, and for every 100 females age 18 and over there were 87.0 males age 18 and over.

The racial makeup of the county was 46.5% White, 44.3% Black or African American, 0.4% American Indian and Alaska Native, 0.7% Asian, 0.2% Native Hawaiian and Pacific Islander, 2.0% from some other race, and 5.8% from two or more races. Hispanic or Latino residents of any race comprised 5.4% of the population.

59.6% of residents lived in urban areas, while 40.4% lived in rural areas.

There were 23,997 households in the county, of which 32.2% had children under the age of 18 living with them and 35.4% had a female householder with no spouse or partner present. About 31.1% of all households were made up of individuals and 11.6% had someone living alone who was 65 years of age or older.

There were 27,253 housing units, of which 11.9% were vacant. Among occupied housing units, 57.1% were owner-occupied and 42.9% were renter-occupied. The homeowner vacancy rate was 1.6% and the rental vacancy rate was 7.1%.

=== Racial and ethnic composition ===
Russell County, Alabama – Racial and ethnic composition Note: the US Census treats Hispanic/Latino as an ethnic category. This table excludes Latinos from the racial categories and assigns them to a separate category. Hispanics/Latinos may be of any race.
Race / Ethnicity (NH = Non-Hispanic)	Pop 2000	Pop 2010	Pop 2020	% 2000	% 2010	% 2020
White alone (NH)	27,925	27,591	26,679	56.12%	52.11%	45.08%
Black or African American alone (NH)	20,217	21,926	25,930	40.63%	41.41%	43.81%
Native American or Alaska Native alone (NH)	164	189	180	0.33%	0.36%	0.30%
Asian alone (NH)	173	223	408	0.35%	0.42%	0.69%
Pacific Islander alone (NH)	34	112	128	0.07%	0.21%	0.22%
Other race alone (NH)	43	55	234	0.09%	0.10%	0.40%
Mixed race or Multiracial (NH)	456	905	2,429	0.92%	1.71%	4.10%
Hispanic or Latino (any race)	744	1,946	3,195	1.50%	3.68%	5.40%
Total	49,756	52,947	59,183	100.00%	100.00%	100.00%

=== 2010 census ===
As of the census of 2010, there were 52,947 people living in the county. 53.7% were White, 41.8% Black or African American, 0.4% Asian, 0.4% Native American, 0.2% Pacific Islander, 1.3% of some other race and 2.1% of two or more races. 3.7% were Hispanic or Latino (of any race).

=== 2000 census ===
As of the census of 2000, there were 49,756 people, 19,741 households, and 13,423 families living in the county. The population density was 78 inhabitants per square mile (30 inhabitants/km^{2}). There were 22,831 housing units, at an average density of 14/km^{2} (36/mi^{2}). The racial makeup of the county was: 56.69% White, 40.84% Black or African American, 0.37% Native American, 0.36% Asian, 0.07% Pacific Islander, 0.59% from other races, and 1.07% from two or more races. Nearly 1.50% of the population were Hispanic or Latino of any race.

There were 19,741 households, out of which 32.00% had children under the age of 18 living with them; 44.40% were married couples living together, 18.90% had a female householder with no husband present, and 32.00% were non-families. 28.00% of all households were made up of individuals, and 10.60% had someone living alone who was 65 years of age or older. The average household size was 2.49, and the average family size was 3.05.

In the county, the population was spread out, with 26.50% under the age of 18, 9.10% from 18 to 24, 28.80% from 25 to 44, 22.40% from 45 to 64, and 13.10% who were 65 years of age or older. The median age was 35 years. For every 100 females, there were 91.00 males. For every 100 females age 18 and over, there were 85.90 males.

The median income for a household in the county was $27,492, and the median income for a family was $34,004. Males had a median income of $28,696 versus $20,882 for females. The per capita income for the county was $14,015. About 16.80% of families and 19.90% of the population were below the poverty line, including 26.50% of those under age 18 and 19.30% of those age 65 or over.

== Government ==
Russell County narrowly trends Democratic in presidential elections; having last supported a Republican in 1972 when it voted for Richard Nixon. George W. Bush came within 38 votes of carrying the county in 2004.

United States presidential election results for Russell County, Alabama
Year	Republican		Democratic		Third party(ies)	
Year	No.	%	No.	%	No.	%
1836	154	79.38%	40	20.62%	0	0.00%
1840	691	62.99%	406	37.01%	0	0.00%
1844	736	54.12%	624	45.88%	0	0.00%
1848	970	62.70%	577	37.30%	0	0.00%
1852	434	44.29%	522	53.27%	24	2.45%
1856	0	0.00%	994	53.76%	855	46.24%
1860	0	0.00%	53	2.79%	1,847	97.21%
1868	1,746	58.67%	1,230	41.33%	0	0.00%
1872	2,531	60.23%	1,671	39.77%	0	0.00%
1876	1,022	33.26%	2,051	66.74%	0	0.00%
1880	1,402	45.52%	1,678	54.48%	0	0.00%
1884	1,347	40.27%	1,998	59.73%	0	0.00%
1888	1,088	35.58%	1,970	64.42%	0	0.00%
1892	10	0.27%	2,150	58.65%	1,506	41.08%
1896	773	31.47%	1,645	66.98%	38	1.55%
1900	135	8.59%	1,416	90.13%	20	1.27%
1904	21	3.54%	558	94.10%	14	2.36%
1908	32	5.64%	516	91.01%	19	3.35%
1912	4	0.25%	1,553	96.22%	57	3.53%
1916	3	0.40%	752	99.08%	4	0.53%
1920	29	3.88%	671	89.71%	48	6.42%
1924	14	2.70%	474	91.33%	31	5.97%
1928	333	27.82%	846	70.68%	18	1.50%
1932	46	2.26%	1,984	97.40%	7	0.34%
1936	66	2.93%	2,181	96.68%	9	0.40%
1940	48	1.93%	2,435	97.95%	3	0.12%
1944	115	5.16%	2,109	94.66%	4	0.18%
1948	94	5.29%	0	0.00%	1,682	94.71%
1952	867	19.55%	3,564	80.38%	3	0.07%
1956	1,265	28.24%	3,060	68.32%	154	3.44%
1960	1,770	33.41%	3,480	65.69%	48	0.91%
1964	4,877	76.04%	0	0.00%	1,537	23.96%
1968	704	6.26%	2,707	24.07%	7,834	69.67%
1972	6,034	66.73%	2,644	29.24%	365	4.04%
1976	4,150	32.96%	8,077	64.14%	365	2.90%
1980	4,485	33.22%	8,123	60.17%	892	6.61%
1984	6,654	46.04%	7,610	52.66%	188	1.30%
1988	6,333	48.40%	6,589	50.35%	164	1.25%
1992	5,587	35.61%	8,647	55.12%	1,455	9.27%
1996	5,025	36.69%	7,834	57.20%	836	6.10%
2000	6,198	41.95%	8,396	56.83%	181	1.23%
2004	8,337	49.60%	8,375	49.82%	97	0.58%
2008	8,705	46.02%	10,085	53.32%	125	0.66%
2012	8,278	43.78%	10,500	55.53%	132	0.70%
2016	9,210	47.83%	9,579	49.75%	467	2.43%
2020	9,864	46.25%	11,228	52.64%	237	1.11%
2024	10,078	48.64%	10,422	50.30%	218	1.05%

United States Senate election results for Russell County, Alabama2
Year	Republican		Democratic		Third party(ies)	
Year	No.	%	No.	%	No.	%
2020	9,383	44.14%	11,853	55.77%	19	0.09%

United States Senate election results for Russell County, Alabama3
Year	Republican		Democratic		Third party(ies)	
Year	No.	%	No.	%	No.	%
2022	5,967	51.68%	5,398	46.76%	180	1.56%

Alabama Gubernatorial election results for Russell County
Year	Republican		Democratic		Third party(ies)	
Year	No.	%	No.	%	No.	%
2022	6,144	53.11%	5,146	44.48%	279	2.41%

== Communities ==
=== City ===
- Phenix City (county seat; partly in Lee County)

=== Town ===
- Hurtsboro

=== Census-designated place ===
- Ladonia

=== Unincorporated communities ===
- Cottonton
- Crawford
- Fort Mitchell
- Glenville
- Hatchechubbee
- Holy Trinity
- Hooks
- Jernigan
- Mahrt
- Pittsview
- Sandfort
- Seale
- Uchee
- Wende

=== Former city ===
- Girard (merged with Phenix City in 1923)

== Notable people ==
- James Abercrombie, United States Congressman from Alabama, resided here.
- Miriam Howard Dubose was born here.

== See also ==
- Russell County School District
- National Register of Historic Places listings in Russell County, Alabama
- Properties on the Alabama Register of Landmarks and Heritage in Russell County, Alabama

== Sources ==
- Bernstein, Lee (2009), The Greatest Menace: Organized Crime in Cold War America, University of Massachusetts Press, ISBN 978-1-55849-747-4
- Coakley, Robert W.; Scheips, Paul J.; Demma, Vincent H. (1971), Use of Troops in Civil Disturbances Since World War II, 1945–1965, Office of Military History, U.S. Army
- Grady, Alan (2005), When Good Men Do Nothing: The Assassination Of Albert Patterson, University of Alabama Press, ISBN 978-0-8173-5192-2
- Stewart, John Craig (1998), The Governors of Alabama, Pelican Publishing, ISBN 978-1-4556-0519-4
