= Walter F. George Lake =

Lake along the state line between Alabama and Georgia

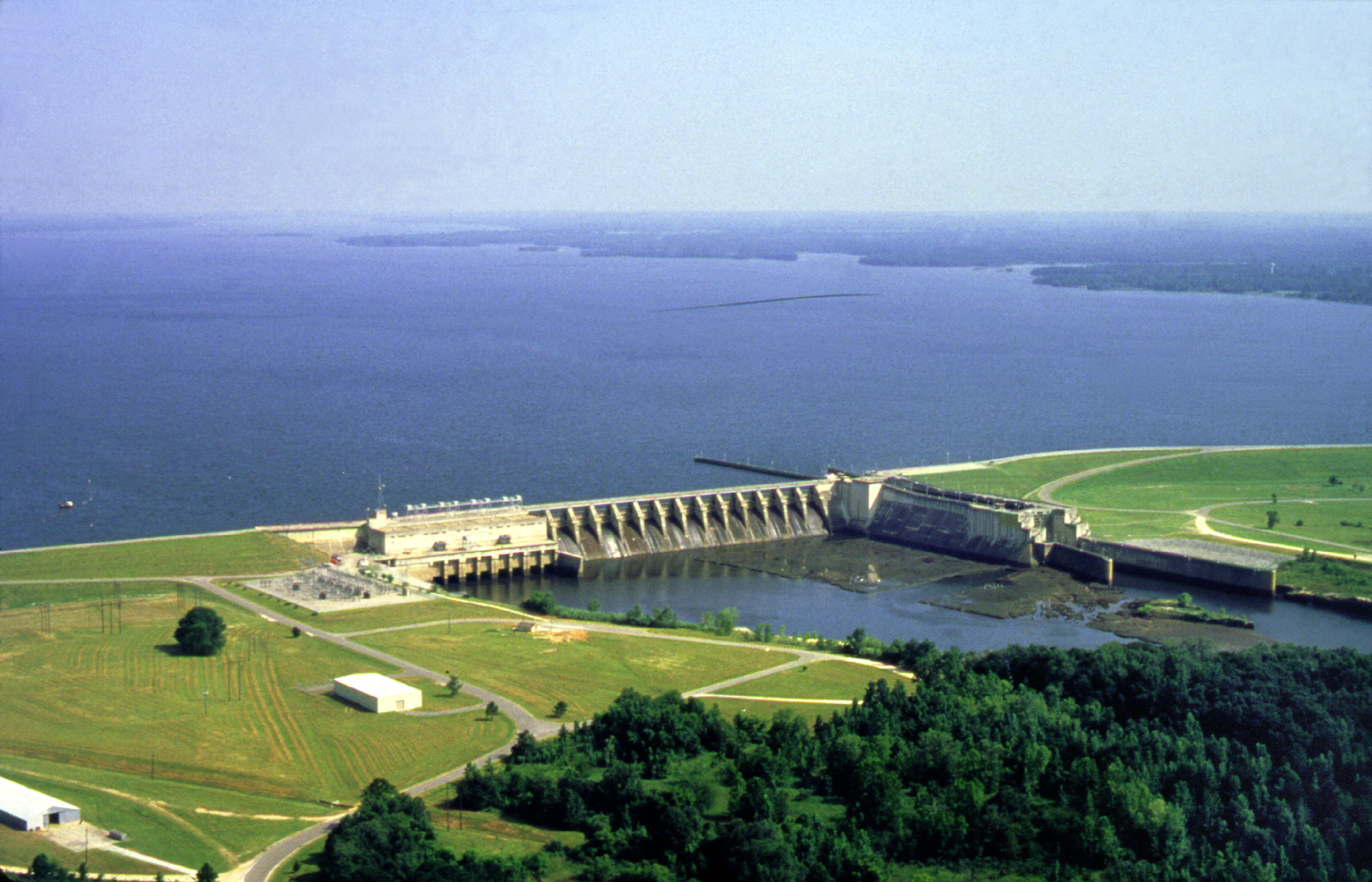
- Walter F. George Lock and Dam

- Location within Alabama Location within the United States
- Location: Alabama–Georgia state line, United States
- Coordinates: 31°48′N 85°8′W
- Primary inflows: Chattahoochee River
- Primary outflows: Chattahoochee River
- Basin countries: United States
- Surface area: 45,181 acres (182.8 km^{2})
- Average depth: 15–18 feet (4.6–5.5 m)
- Max. depth: 100 ft (30 m)
- Shore length^{1}: 640 mi (1,030 km)
- Surface elevation: 190 ft (58 m)
- Islands: Gopher Island, Rabbit Island
- Settlements: Eufaula, Alabama; Georgetown, Georgia; Fort Gaines, Georgia
- ^{1} Shore length is not a well-defined measure.

The Walter F. George Lake, named for Walter F. George (1878–1957), a United States senator from Georgia, is formed on the Chattahoochee River along the state line between Alabama and Georgia. It is also widely known by the name, Lake Eufaula – particularly in Alabama, where the state legislature passed a resolution on June 25, 1963, to give the lake that name. The 46,000 acres (190 km^{2}) lake extends north about 85 miles (140 km) from the Walter F. George Lock and Dam (31°37′10″N 85°4′15″W) and has approximately 640 miles (1,030 km) of shoreline. Popular activities along the lake include camping and trophy fishing.

The lake is primarily controlled by the United States Army Corps of Engineers. The states control several other protected lands along the lake, including the Eufaula National Wildlife Refuge and Lakepoint State Park in Alabama, and Florence Marina and George T. Bagby state parks in Georgia.

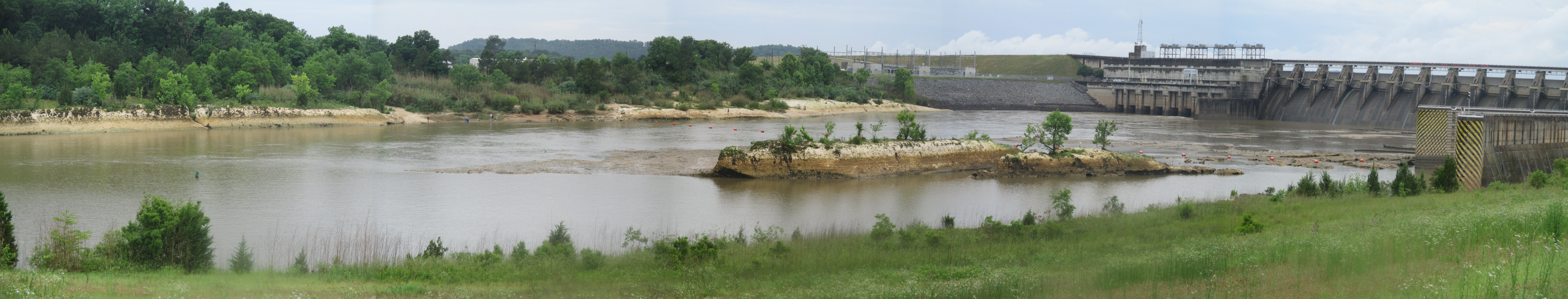
Panoramic view of the reservoir and the dam

The flooding of the land in the area covered numerous historic and prehistoric sites associated with Native American culture. Indigenous peoples had lived along the river for thousands of years. The unincorporated area of Oketeyeconne, Georgia, which historically had a majority of Native American residents, was evacuated in the 1950s to allow creation of the lake.
