= Eufaula National Wildlife Refuge =

US protected area

- IUCN category IV (habitat/species management area)
- Location within the United States
- Location: Barbour County, Alabama
- Nearest city: Eufaula, Alabama
- Coordinates: 31.997012°N 85.08894°W
- Area: 11,184 acres (4,526 ha)
- Established: 1964
- Visitors: 325,000 (in 2005)
- Governing body: U.S. Fish and Wildlife Service
- Website: Eufaula NWR

Eufaula National Wildlife Refuge is an 11,184 acre (45.26 km^{2}) National Wildlife Refuge located in Barbour and Russell counties in Alabama and Stewart and Quitman counties in Georgia. Eufaula NWR is located on the Walter F. George Lake (also known as Lake Eufaula) along the Chattahoochee River between Alabama and Georgia. Of the 11,184 acres (45.26 km^{2}) of managed property, 7,953 acres (32.18 km^{2}) are in Alabama and 3,231 acres (13.08 km^{2}) are in Georgia.

Eufaula NWR was established in 1964 in cooperation with the United States Army Corps of Engineers which manages the Walter F. George Lock and Dam and the majority of Walter F. George Lake. More than 325,000 visitors per year visit the refuge. The fiscal year 2005 budget was $718,000.

== Wildlife ==
The Eufaula NWR protects endangered and threatened species such as the wood stork.

There is a variety of wildlife habitats in the Eufaula NWR including approximately 4000 acres (16 km^{2}) of open water, 3000 acres (12 km^{2}) of wetlands, 2000 acres (8 km^{2}) of woodlands, 1000 acres (4 km^{2}) of croplands and 1000 acres (4 km^{2}) of grasslands. This diverse area provides shelter for migratory waterfowl and other birds. Other wildlife species include raccoon, white-tailed deer, quail, beaver, red and gray fox species, dove, bobcat, hawk, armadillo, owl, rabbit, squirrel, river otter, turkey, and coyote, not to mention other reptiles (alligators and copperheads), amphibians, insects and various fishes.

== Facilities ==
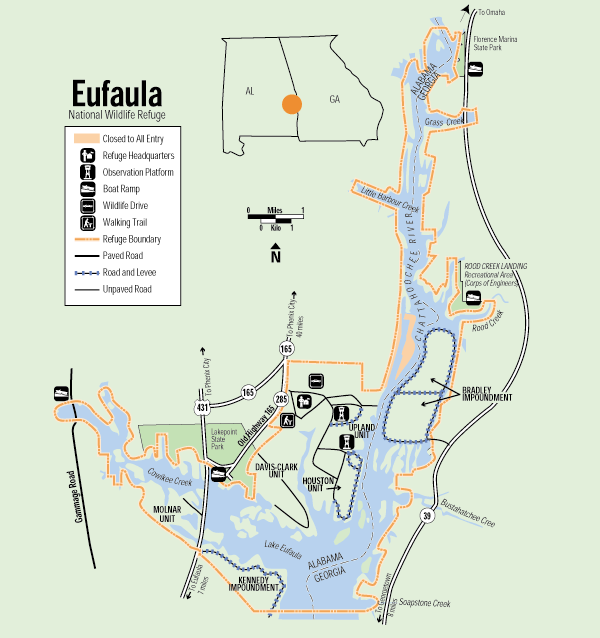
Map of Eufaula NWR

Lake Eufaula offers several activities including boating, fishing, and kayaking. Additionally, there is a seven-mile (11 km) auto-tour trail, two observation towers, and a walking trail. Lakepoint State Park borders the Eufaula NWR on the Alabama side of the river, near the city of Eufaula. Kayak Eufaula is located inside the welcome center of Lakepoint State Park offering kayak rentals and guided tours.

== See also ==
- List of National Wildlife Refuges
