= Lakepoint State Park =

State park in Barbour County, Alabama, United States

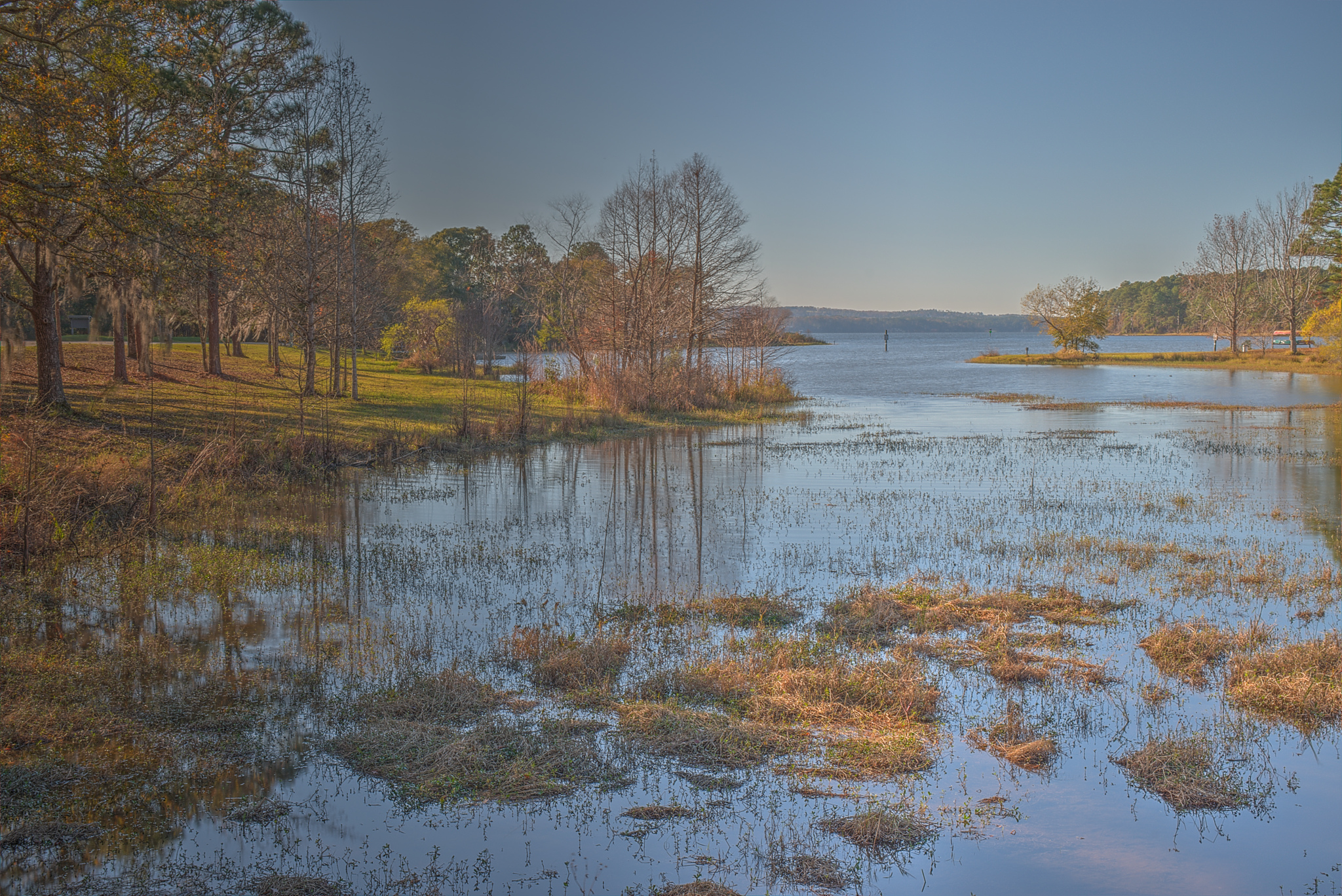
- Lake Eufaula

- Location within Alabama
- Location: Eufaula, Alabama, United States
- Coordinates: 31°59′27″N 85°6′54″W
- Area: 1,220 acres (490 ha)
- Elevation: 190 ft (58 m)
- Established: 1968
- Administrator: Alabama Department of Conservation and Natural Resources
- Website: Official website

Lakepoint State Park is a public recreation area located on the far north side of the city of Eufaula. The state park encompasses 1,220 acres (490 ha) on the western shore of Lake Eufala (Walter F. George Lake), a 45,000-acre (18,000 ha) impoundment of the Chattahoochee River. The park adjoins Eufaula National Wildlife Refuge and is managed by the Alabama Department of Conservation and Natural Resources.

== History ==
The park had its begins in 1968 with the state's purchase of 768 acres (311 ha) on the shores of Walter F. George Reservoir. A campground and day-use facilities were added to the site in 1974.

An 18-hole golf course, which had been constructed in 1972, was closed at the end of November 2015 in response to the statewide parks budgeting crisis which saw the closing or curtailment of services at several Alabama state parks. In announcing the shutdown, state parks director Gregory M. Lein said an attempt had been made to find a concessionaire to take charge of golf course operations but that no takers had come forward. The golf course site was converted to an off-road vehicle course, which opened in 2022.

== Activities and amenities ==
Park facilities include a convention center, 101-room lodge, 192-campground sites, and a complex of lakeside cottages and fishermen's cabins. The grounds also include a marina, swimming pools, hiking trails, and picnicking areas.
