= Fort Mitchell, Alabama =

Fort Mitchell
- Unincorporated community
- Location in Alabama.
- Coordinates: 32°20′30″N 85°01′18″W
- Country: United States
- State: Alabama
- County: Russell
- Elevation: 354 ft (108 m)
- Time zone: UTC-6 (Central (CST))
  - Summer (DST): UTC-5 (CDT)
- ZIP code: 36856
- Area code: 334
- GNIS feature ID: 118523

Fort Mitchell is an unincorporated community in Russell County, Alabama, United States. The settlement developed around a garrisoned fort intended to provide defense for the area during the Creek War (1813–14).

Fort Mitchell is about 10 miles south of Phenix City, Alabama and Columbus, Georgia; Fort Benning lies on the opposite side of the Chattahoochee River from Fort Mitchell.

The community is the home of the Fort Mitchell National Cemetery, established in 1987 for interment of all US veterans.

== Landmarks ==
- Fort Mitchell National Cemetery
- Fort Mitchell Historic Site

== Notable people ==
- James Cantey, Confederate States Army brigadier general
- Samuel Checote, Muskogee Creek, who was the first principal chief of the tribe, then located in Indian Territory, after the Civil War
- John Crowell, first U.S. Representative from Alabama; appointed by President Monroe as the United States agent to the Creek Indians (1821-?)

== See also ==
- Asbury Manual Labor School

== Gallery ==
Below are photographs taken in Fort Mitchell as part of the Historic American Buildings Survey:

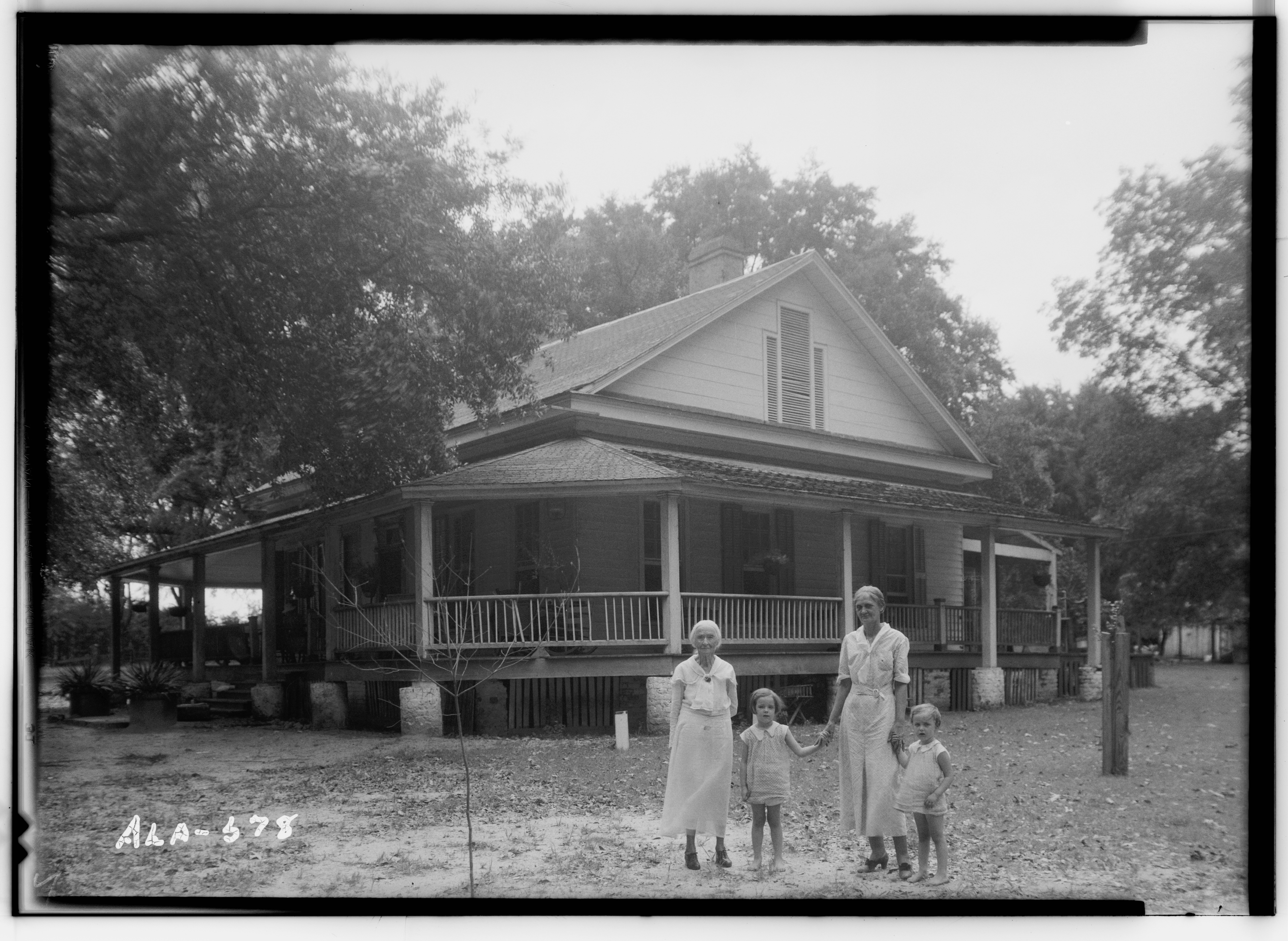
Crowell-Cantey-Alexander House

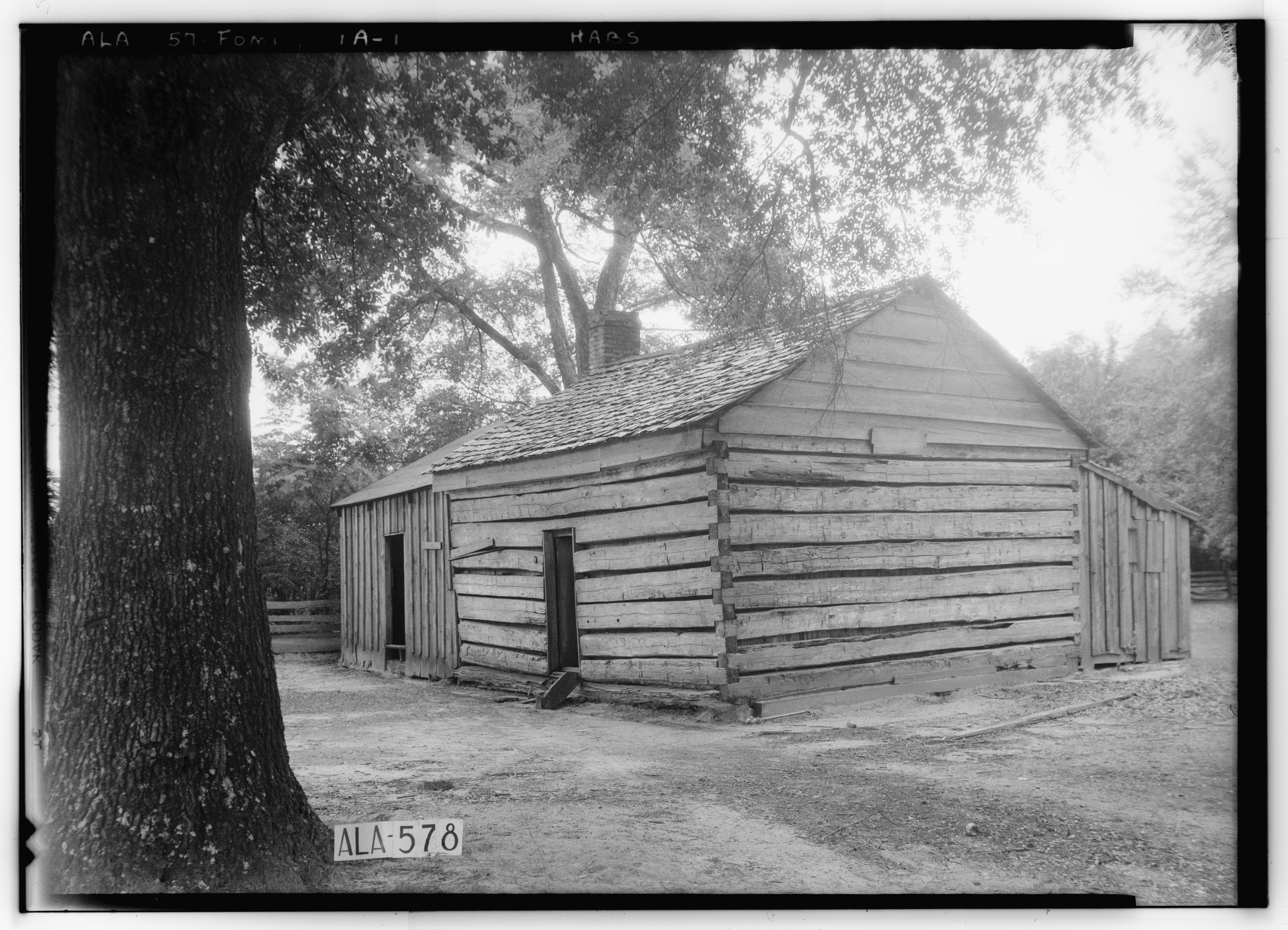
Old slave house, beside Crowell-Cantey-Alexander House

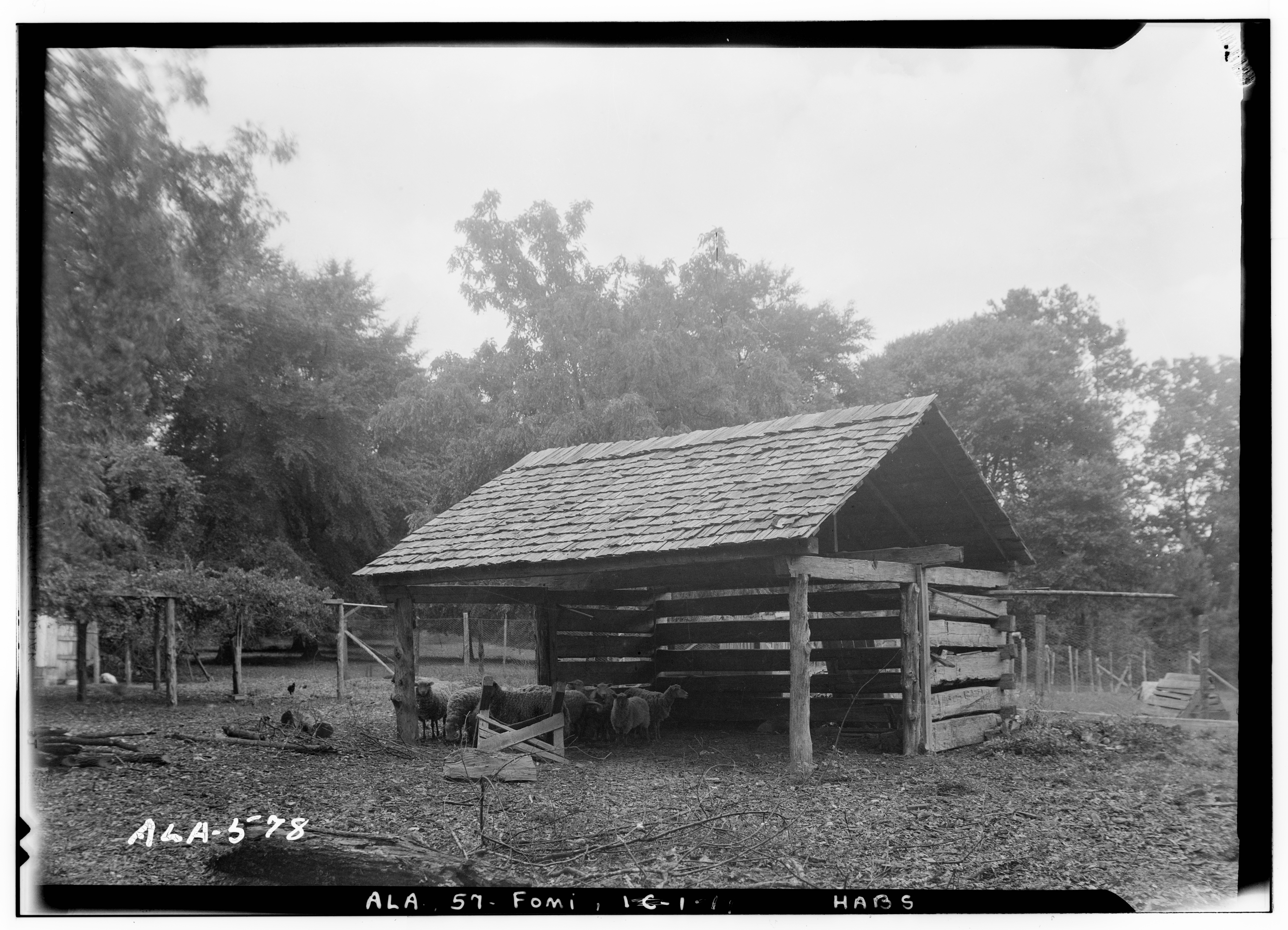
Wood shed, behind Crowell-Cantey-Alexander House

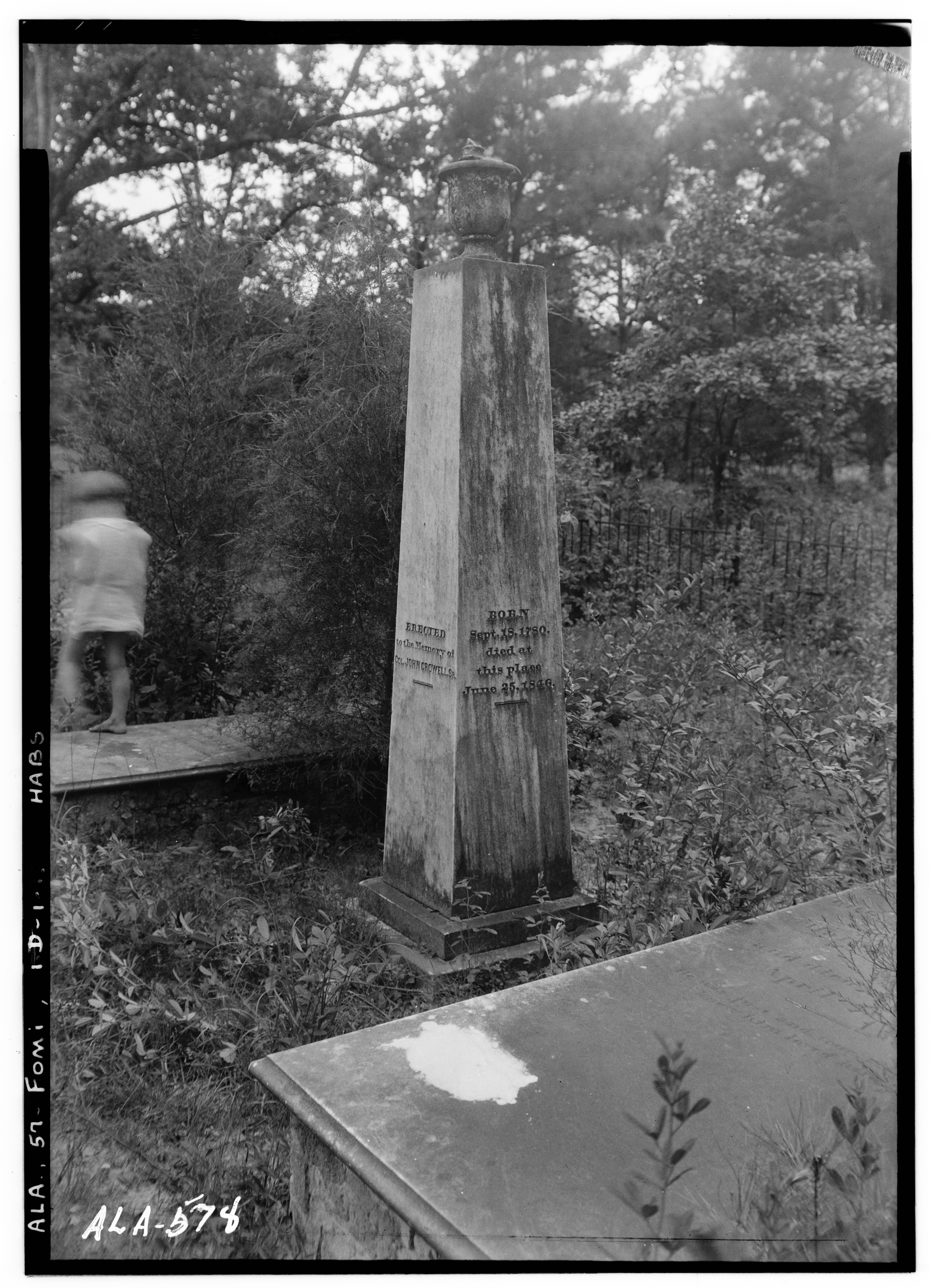
Monument to Col. John Crowell Sr., at Crowell-Cantey-Alexander House

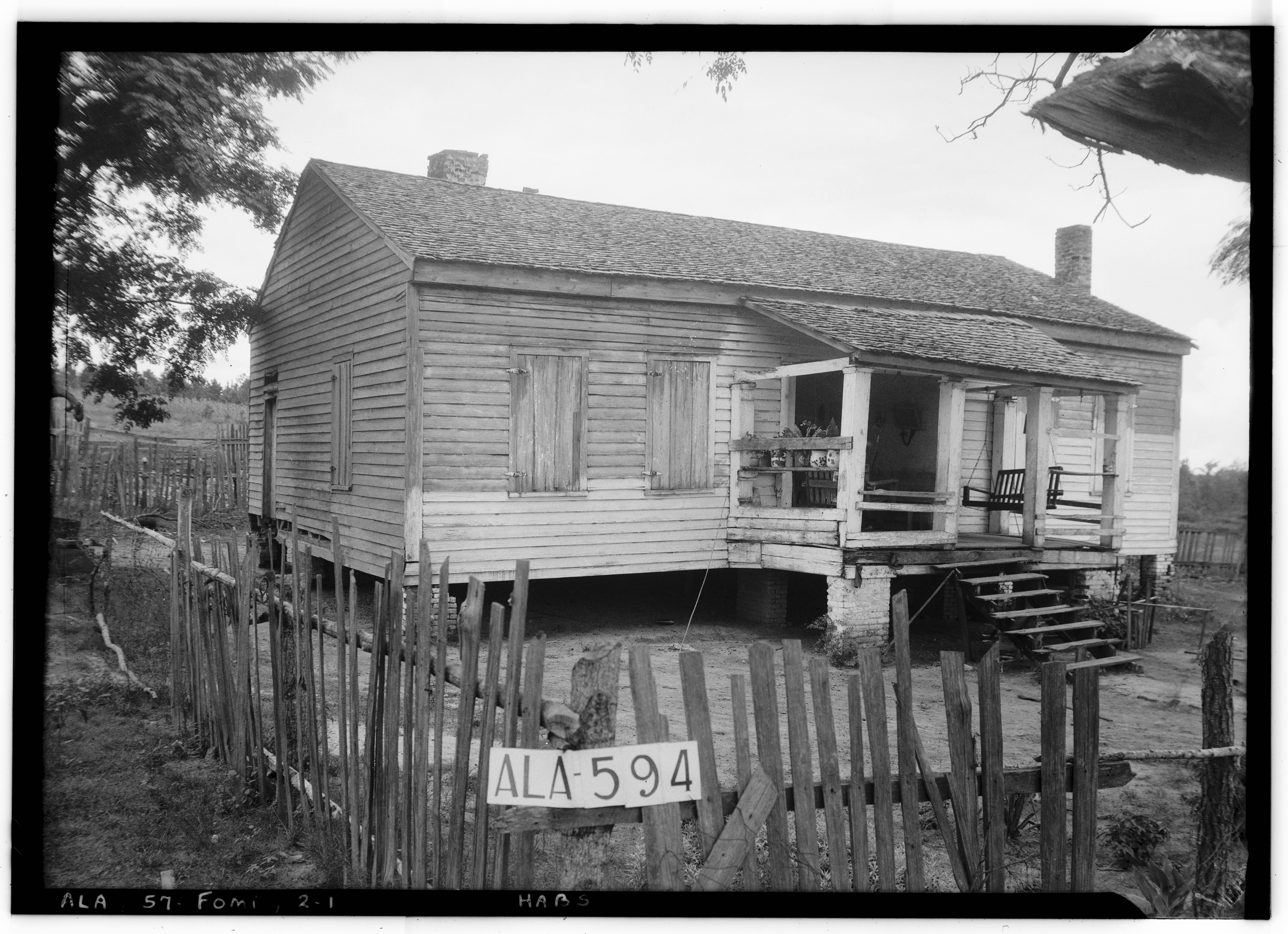
Old post office

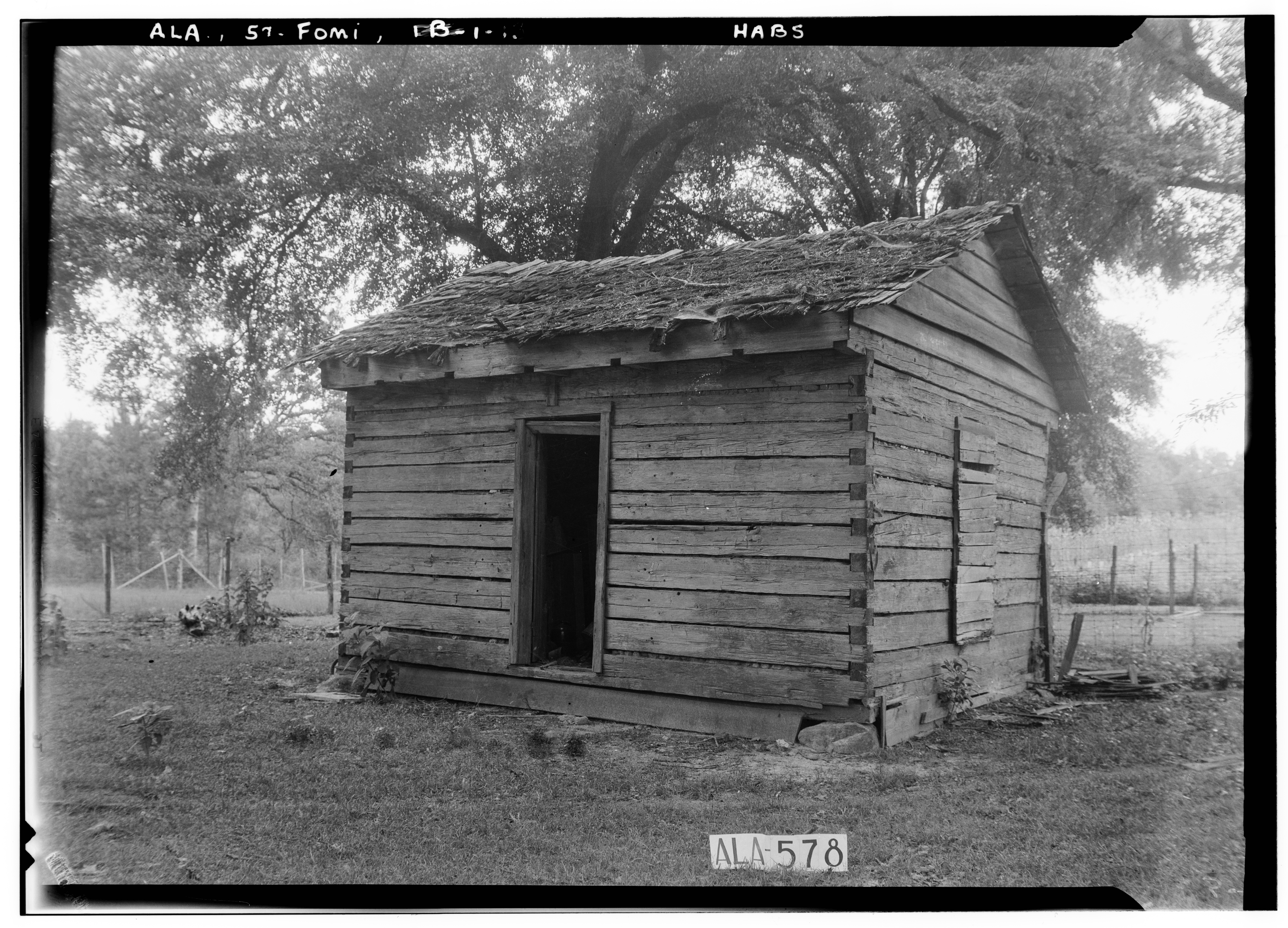
Old Irish gardener house
