= Fort Mitchell National Cemetery =

Veterans cemetery in Russell County, Alabama

Coordinates: 32°21′03″N 85°01′18″W

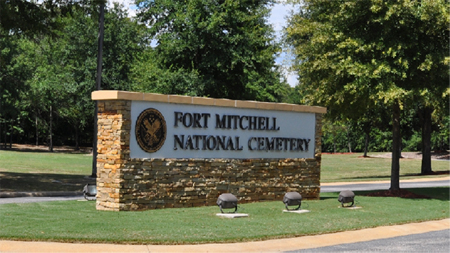
- Fort Mitchell National Cemetery
- Interactive map of Fort Mitchell National Cemetery

Details
- Location: Fort Mitchell, Alabama
- Country: United States
- Type: United States National Cemeteries
- Size: 280 acres (110 ha)
- No. of graves: 5,000 (approximate)

Fort Mitchell National Cemetery is one of the 130 United States National Cemeteries, located in Fort Mitchell, Alabama, adjacent to the state-owned and operated Fort Mitchell Park. It has interred approximately 5,000 individual since it officially opened its 280-acre (110 ha) site in 1987. It serves as a national cemetery in Federal Region IV, to serve veterans residing in North Carolina, South Carolina, Georgia, Florida, Alabama, Tennessee, and Mississippi.

== History ==
The Georgia Militia originally constructed Fort Mitchell in order to sustain a military presence in the area during the Creek War of 1813 to 1814. Shortly after the fort's completion, the Georgia Militia launched an attack against the British at Tuckabatchie and Hothlewali. The militia was ambushed and driven back to Fort Mitchell by a combined force of Creeks and British. Thereafter, until 1825, a small force continued to garrison at the fort.

From 1817 to 1825, Fort Mitchell gradually emerged as a center of commerce for trade with Native Americans. In 1817, a trading house, or factory, was established where produced goods were available to local tribes at prices below what they could otherwise afford. In 1818, a post office was added to the newly extended Federal Road that crossed through Fort Mitchell from Augusta, Georgia, and westward into the Alabama Territory.

In 1821, an Indian agency was created at Fort Mitchell, and Colonel John Crowell was appointed agent to the Creeks. While Crowell managed the agency, his brother, Thomas, ran the tavern, which later served as an officer's quarters.

Fort Mitchell became central to the protection of Native Americans as settlers consistently violated the Creek territory as defined under terms of the 1814 Treaty of Fort Jackson. In response to Native American protests, a new fort was constructed and occupied by the 4th U.S. Infantry in summer 1825, and it remained garrisoned almost continually through 1840. The second fort encompassed the first, and while much larger, was similar in design.

The use of force against white trespassers was effective. In 1831, a group of white settlers invaded the Indian community of Ola Ufalal (now Eufaula), evicted the Creeks, burned their houses, and built their own settlement. The U.S. marshal protested the settlers' actions, and when defied, the commandant at Fort Mitchell dispatched a company to demand the surrender and evacuation of the town. The residents complied and retreated across the Chattahoochee River.

President Andrew Jackson was committed to a policy of removing Native Americans, however, and was not eager to use force against settlers who were supported by the laws of Georgia and Alabama. For every ejection of a trespasser evacuated by troops at Fort Mitchell, 10 intruders would cross the river and enter Creek territory.

The hopelessness of the military's position was reflected in the celebrated Hardeman Owen killing. Owen had planned but failed to murder the U.S. marshal. Troops at Fort Mitchell were called out to capture Owen, and in the ensuing melee he was killed. Georgia authorities charged the trooper who fired the fatal shot with murder and demanded the Army hand him over. The commandant refused. Tensions ran high and almost erupted into open warfare. In an attempt to settle the dispute, Francis Scott Key was dispatched by the administration to investigate the affair. He took up residence at Fort Mitchell and composed a report on the condition of the Creeks and the cause of the recent turmoil. He charged that the evils perpetrated on the Native Americans were caused by the weakness of the U.S. government in facing the aggressive actions of the settlers. Key went on to negotiate a settlement, which, after he returned to Washington, was rarely honored.

Creek desperation reached a crisis point in spring 1836. Under the leadership of Chief Eneah-Mathla, an estimated 1,500 warriors attacked the settlements. General Winfield Scott was ordered to intervene and succeeded in overcoming the attack. By July 1836, an estimated 1,600 Creek people were concentrated at Fort Mitchell in preparation for a forced expulsion West. Approximately 2,000 to 3,000 were eventually marched from Fort Mitchell to Montgomery, "shedding tears and making the most bitter wailings." This route is known as the Trail of Tears.

In late 1980s, the old post cemetery at Fort Mitchell was officially identified as the location for a national cemetery in Federal Region IV and was opened in May 1987.

== Notable burials ==
- MAJ Timpoochee Barnard, chief of the Yuchi, allied with U.S. forces during the Creek War (1813–1814) and a signatory to the Treaty of Fort Jackson
- SFC Matthew Leonard (1929–1967 †) US Army Special Forces – Medal of Honor recipient for action in Vietnam (previously buried in Birmingham's Shadow Lawn Memorial Park)
- PVT Romay Davis (née Johnson 1919–2024) United States Army - recipient of the Congressional Gold Medal for her service in the 6888 Central Postal Directory Battalion, the only all-Black, all-female unit to serve overseas during World War II.

== Gallery ==
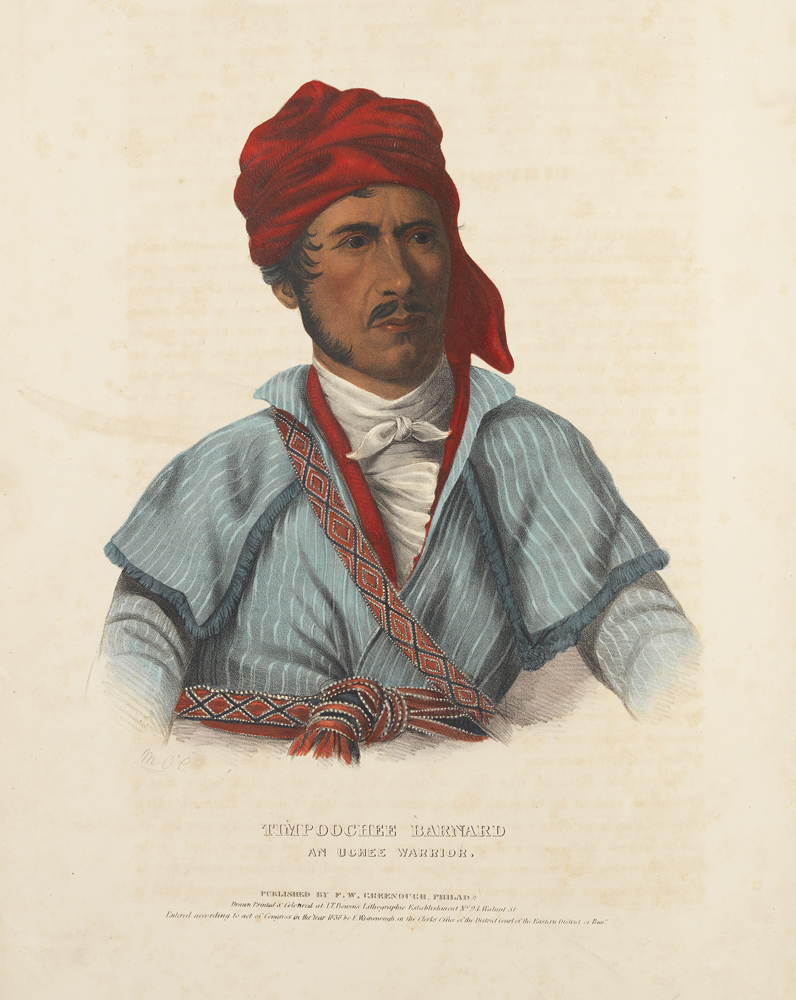
Lithograph of Timpoochee Barnard

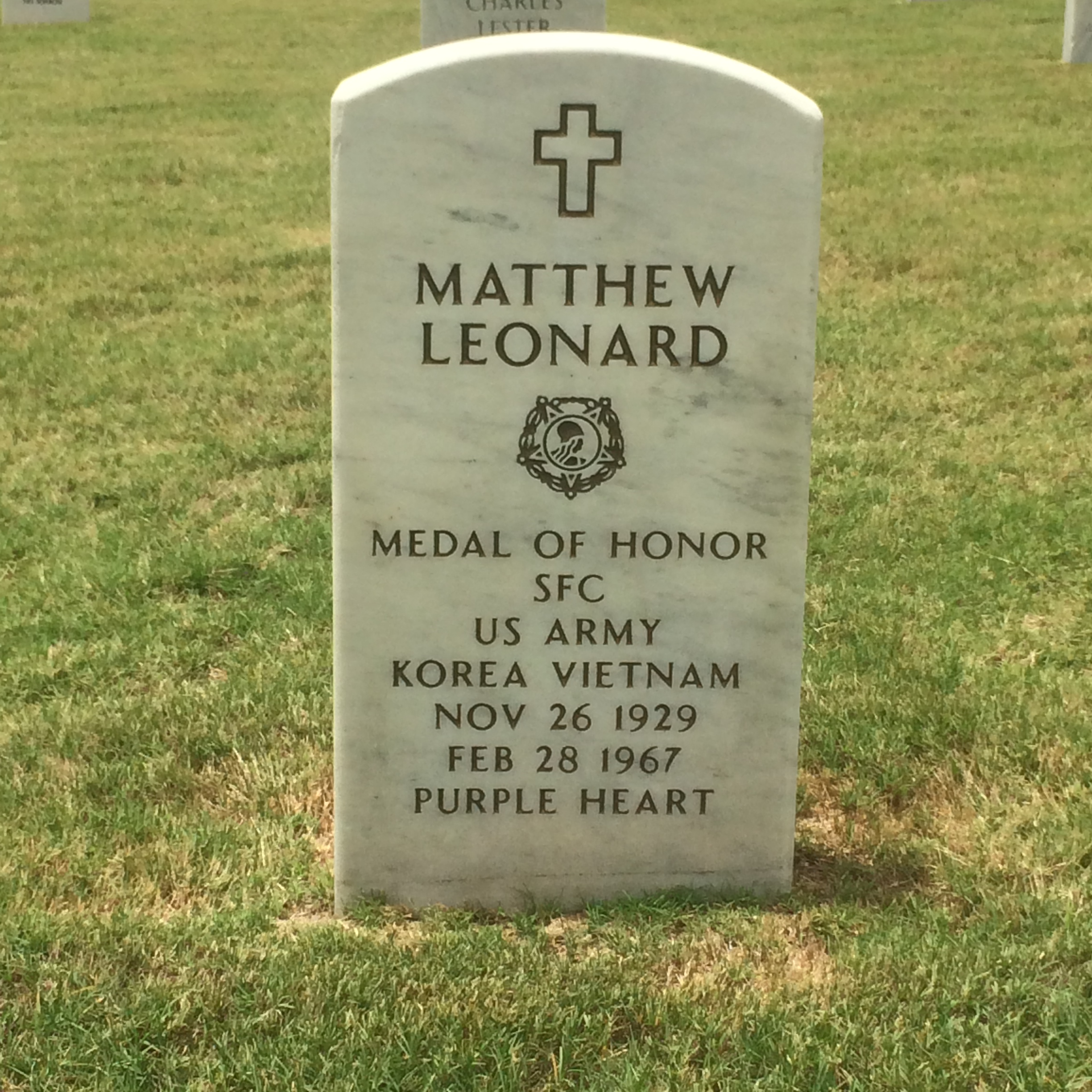
Headstone of Medal of Honor recipient Matthew Leonard
