= National Register of Historic Places listings in Russell County, Alabama =

Location of Russell County in Alabama

This is a list of the National Register of Historic Places listings in Russell County, Alabama.

This is intended to be a complete list of the properties and districts on the National Register of Historic Places in Russell County, Alabama, United States. Latitude and longitude coordinates are provided for many National Register properties and districts; these locations may be seen together in an online map.

There are 25 properties and districts listed on the National Register in the county, including three National Historic Landmarks.

This National Park Service list is complete through NPS recent listings posted May 1, 2026.

== Current listings ==
	Name on the Register	Image	Date listed	Location	City or town	Description
1	Apalachicola Fort	Apalachicola Fort	October 15, 1966 (#66000931)	Address Restricted	Holy Trinity	
2	Bass–Perry House	Bass–Perry House	January 19, 1976 (#76000355)	4 miles northeast of Seale on U.S. Route 431; 32°20′45″N 85°07′55″W	Seale	
3	Brooks–Hughes House	Brooks–Hughes House	November 3, 1983 (#83003477)	1010 Sandfort Rd. 32°27′34″N 85°00′29″W	Phenix City	
4	Brownville–Summerville Historic District		November 3, 1983 (#83003479)	Roughly bounded by 15th and 23rd Sts. and 6th and 11th Aves. 32°28′40″N 85°00′17″W	Phenix City	
5	Floyd–Newsome House	Floyd–Newsome House	November 3, 1983 (#83004373)	900 22nd St. 32°28′56″N 85°00′15″W	Phenix City	
6	Fort Mitchell Site	Fort Mitchell Site	June 13, 1972 (#72000178)	Address Restricted	Fort Mitchell	
7	Fort No. 5	Fort No. 5	May 6, 1976 (#76000354)	West of Phenix on the Opelika Highway; 32°29′00″N 85°02′04″W	Phenix City	
8	Girard High School		November 3, 1983 (#83003480)	Sandfort Rd. 32°27′39″N 85°00′15″W	Phenix City	Girard High School building was demolished in 1994.
9	Girard Historic District		November 3, 1983 (#83003481)	Roughly bounded by 8th Pl., 10th St., 5th and 8th Aves. 32°27′45″N 85°00′06″W	Phenix City	
10	Glenn–Thompson Plantation	Glenn–Thompson Plantation	April 9, 1980 (#80000735)	South of Pittsview on U.S. Route 431; 32°08′14″N 85°09′03″W	Pittsview	
11	Glennville Historic District	Glennville Historic District	August 7, 1979 (#79000402)	South of Pittsview; 32°06′38″N 85°10′09″W	Pittsview	
12	Joel Hurt House	Joel Hurt House	August 11, 2005 (#05000834)	605 Church St. 32°14′26″N 85°24′39″W	Hurtsboro	
13	Hurtsboro Historic District	Hurtsboro Historic District	October 19, 2009 (#09000001)	308-905 Church St., 508 Daniel St., 303-407 Dickinson St., 302-802 Goolsby St., 402-502 Lloyd St., and 242-282 Long St. 32°14′40″N 85°24′47″W	Hurtsboro	
14	Kid Alley Residential Historic District		November 3, 1983 (#83003482)	11th Ave. at 9th Pl. 32°27′52″N 85°00′27″W	Phenix City	
15	Lower Twentieth Street Residential Historic District		November 3, 1983 (#83003483)	20th St. from 2nd to 6th Aves. 32°28′47″N 84°59′55″W	Phenix City	
16	Morgan–Curtis House	Morgan–Curtis House	November 3, 1983 (#83003484)	1815 Abbott Dr. 32°28′03″N 85°01′11″W	Phenix City	
17	Phenix City Post Office Building	Phenix City Post Office Building	November 30, 2021 (#100007192)	500 14th St. 32°28′23″N 85°00′00″W	Phenix City	Contains the mural Cotton by John Kelly Fitzpatrick
18	Samuel R. Pitts Plantation	Samuel R. Pitts Plantation	June 25, 1992 (#92000819)	East of U.S. Route 431, south of the Southern railroad tracks 32°10′48″N 85°09′42″W	Pittsview	
19	Russell County Courthouse at Seale	Russell County Courthouse at Seale	May 23, 1974 (#74000436)	Courthouse Sq. 32°17′54″N 85°10′03″W	Seale	
20	Shapre–Monte House	Shapre–Monte House	November 3, 1983 (#83003485)	721 6th Ave. 32°27′33″N 85°00′06″W	Phenix City	
21	Smith Residential Historic District		November 3, 1983 (#83003486)	20th St., 7th Ave., and 6th Court; 32°28′47″N 85°00′04″W	Phenix City	
22	Snow Valley Residential Historic District		November 3, 1983 (#83003487)	11th and 12th Sts. at 11th Ave. 32°28′04″N 85°00′29″W	Phenix City	
23	Uchee Methodist Church	Uchee Methodist Church	July 3, 1997 (#97000654)	County Road 22, 1.8 miles west of its junction with County Road 65; 32°21′12″N 85°19′53″W	Uchee	
24	Upper Twentieth Street Residential Historic District		November 3, 1983 (#83003488)	1201-1217 W. 20th St. 32°28′45″N 85°00′38″W	Phenix City	
25	Yuchi Town	Yuchi Town	June 19, 1996 (#95000453)	Address Restricted	Fort Benning	

== See also ==
- List of National Historic Landmarks in Alabama
- National Register of Historic Places listings in Alabama
