= Summerville Historic District =

Summerville Historic District may refer to:

- Brownville-Summerville Historic District, Phenix City, AL, listed on the National Register of Historic Places (NRHP) in Alabama
- Summerville (Augusta, Georgia) Historic District, listed on the NRHP as Summerville Historic District
- Summerville Commercial Historic District, in Chattooga County, Georgia; listed on the NRHP in 2012
- Summerville Historic District (Summerville, South Carolina), listed on the National Register of Historic Places in Dorchester County, South Carolina
