= Shapre–Monte House =

Historic house in Alabama, United States

- Shapre-Monte House
- U.S. National Register of Historic Places
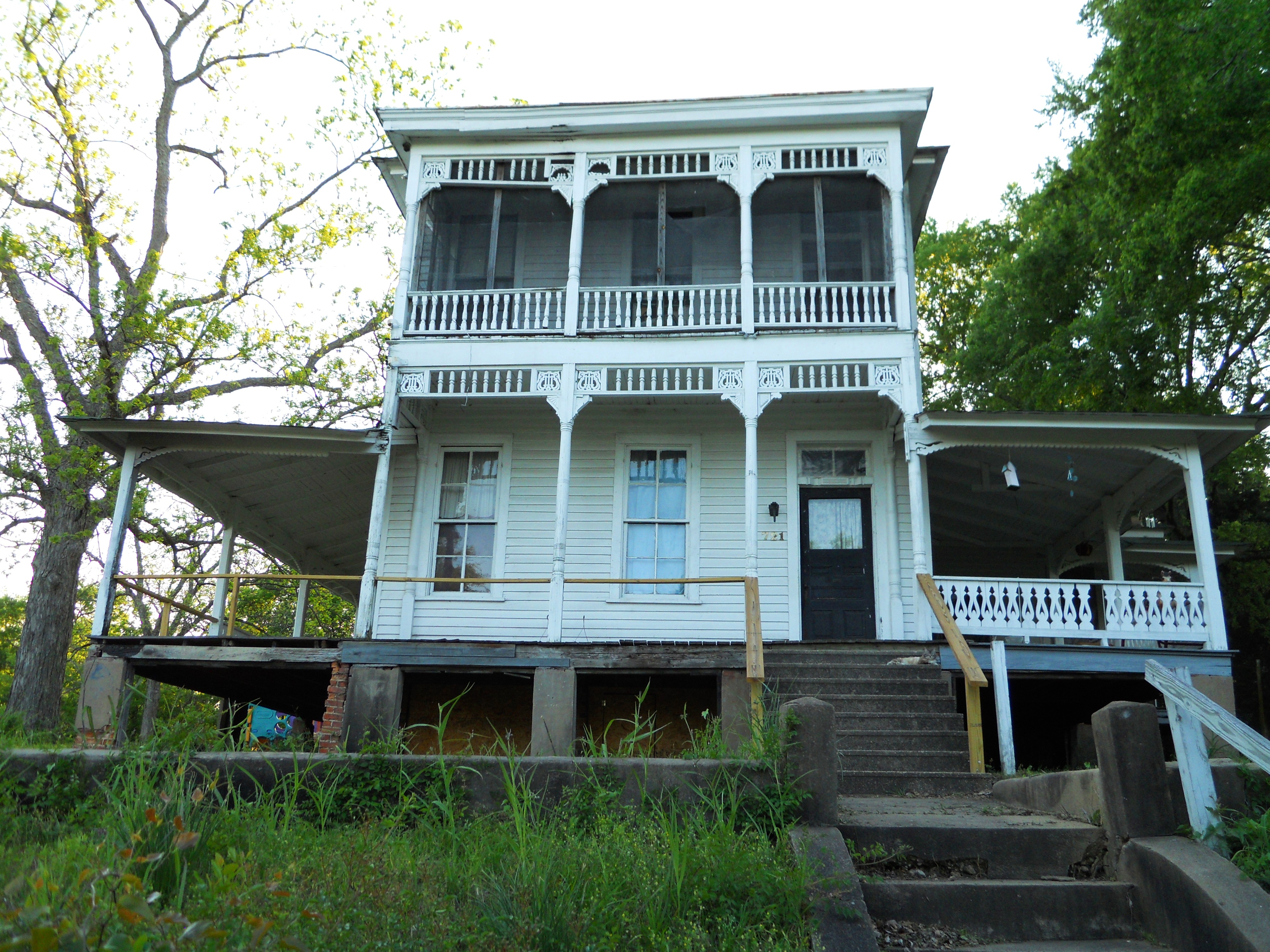
- The Shapre-Monte House in 2011

- Location within Alabama Location within the United States
- Location: 726 6th Avenue, Phenix City, Alabama
- Coordinates: 32°27′32″N 85°0′7″W
- Area: less than one acre
- Built: 1890
- Architectural style: Late Victorian
- MPS: Phenix City MRA
- NRHP reference No.: 83003485
- Added to NRHP: November 3, 1983

The Shapre-Monte House is a historic house in Phenix City, Alabama, U.S. It was built circa 1890 by the Sharpe brothers. It was later purchased by Jacob G. Monte, a tailor from the Netherlands, and it remained in the Monte family until 1968. It has been listed on the National Register of Historic Places since November 3, 1983.
