= Floyd–Newsome House =

Historic house in Alabama, United States

- Floyd-Newsome House
- U.S. National Register of Historic Places
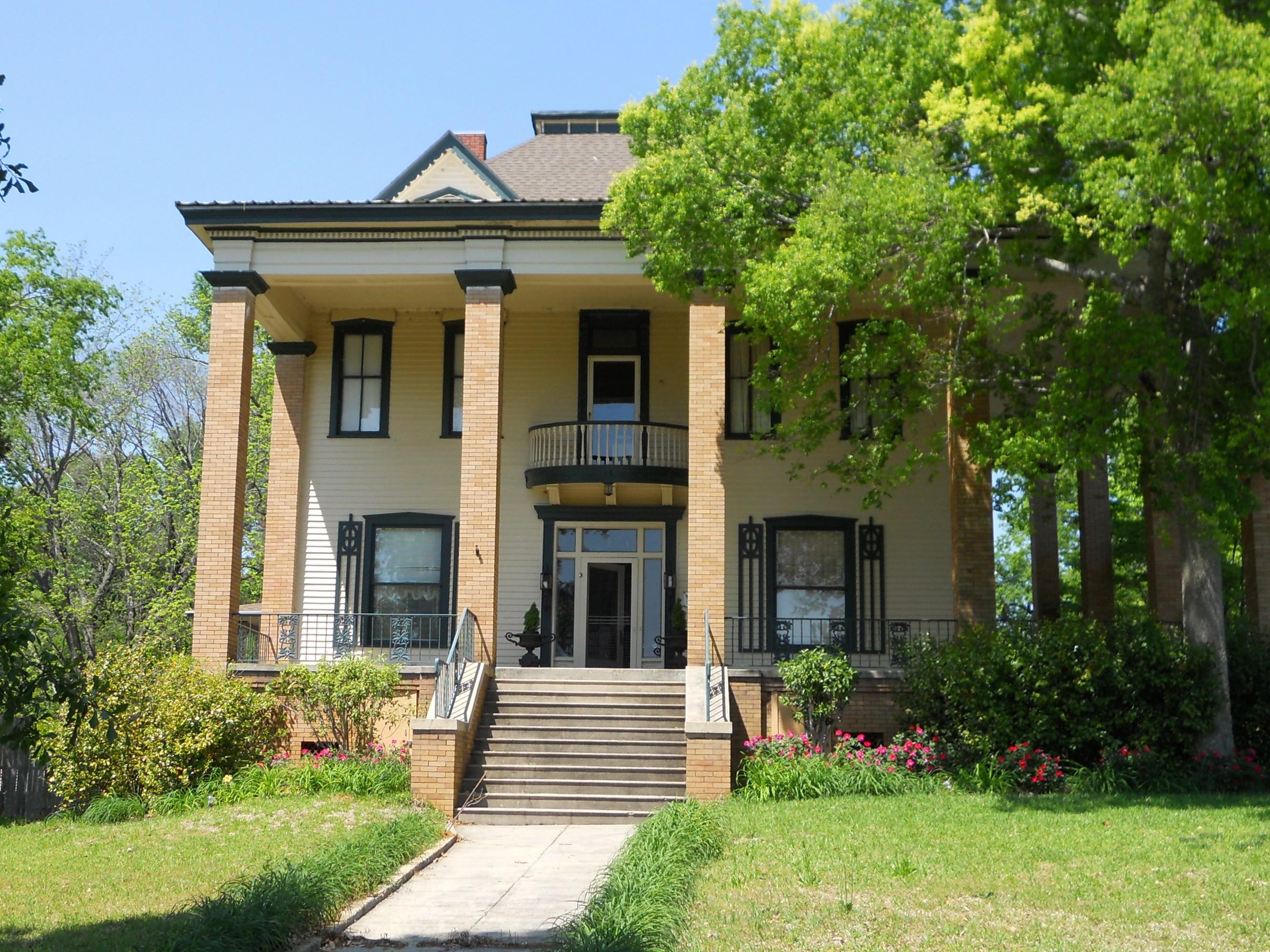
- The Floyd-Newsome House in 2011

- Location within Alabama Location within the United States
- Interactive map showing the location of Floyd-Newsome House
- Location: 900 22nd Street, Phenix City, Alabama
- Coordinates: 32°28′56″N 85°0′15″W
- Area: less than one acre
- Built: 1898
- Architectural style: Classical Revival, Late Victorian
- MPS: Phenix City MRA
- NRHP reference No.: 83004373
- Added to NRHP: November 3, 1983

The Floyd-Newsome House is a historic house in Phenix City, Alabama, U.S. It was built in 1898 as a cottage for Dr Floyd, a physician and judge who was also the mayor of Phenix City. By 1908, a second story was built, and it was redesigned in the classical architectural style. It remained in the Floyd family until 1958, when it was purchased by the Aldridge family. It has been listed on the National Register of Historic Places since November 3, 1983.
