= Russell County Courthouse at Seale =

- U.S. National Register of Historic Places
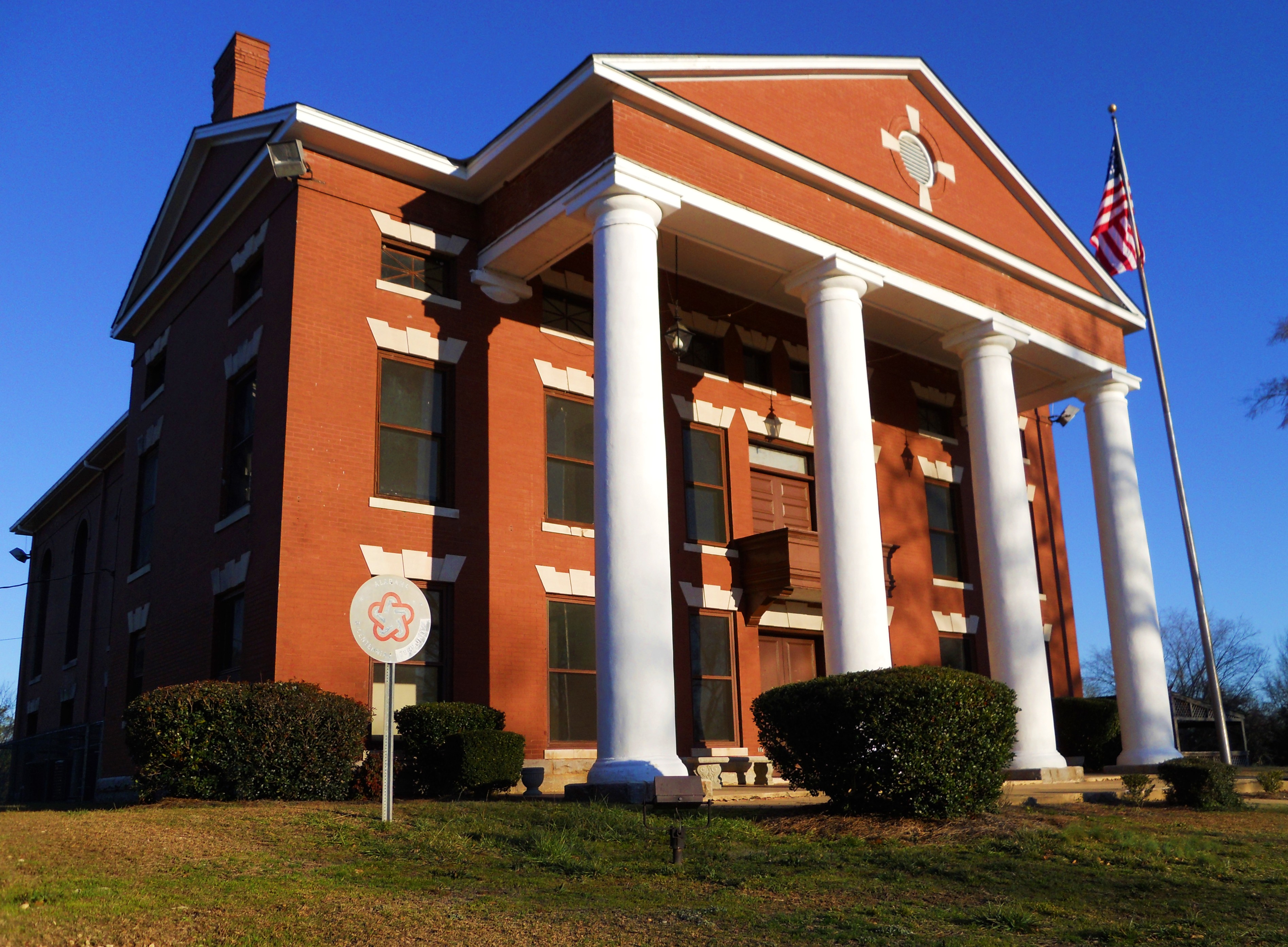
- The courthouse in February 2011
- Interactive map of Russell County Courthouse at Seale
- Location: Courthouse Sq., Seale, Alabama
- Coordinates: 32°17′54″N 85°10′03″W
- Built: 1869
- NRHP reference No.: 74000436
- Added to NRHP: May 23, 1974

The Russell County Courthouse at Seale is a historic building in Seale, Alabama. In 1866, Seale was chosen as the new seat of Russell County. The new courthouse was completed in 1869, and wings were added in 1908. After the merger of Girard and Phenix City in 1923, there was pressure to move the seat to the much larger, but not centrally located Phenix City. Phenix City became the seat in 1935, but the Seale courthouse remained in use as a branch until 1943. It was used for various civic functions through 1958, but became vacant and fell into disrepair until its renovation in the mid-1970s. Today it is again used for civic functions and a museum of natural history.

The two-story Neoclassical building is constructed of red brick. The façade has a full height portico, with Doric columns supporting the pediment. A small balcony is above the entrance. The windows have flat arches with keystones.

The courthouse was listed on the National Register of Historic Places in 1974.
