= Samuel R. Pitts Plantation =

Historic house in Alabama, United States

- Pitts, Samuel R., Plantation
- U.S. National Register of Historic Places
- U.S. Historic district
- Alabama Register of Landmarks and Heritage
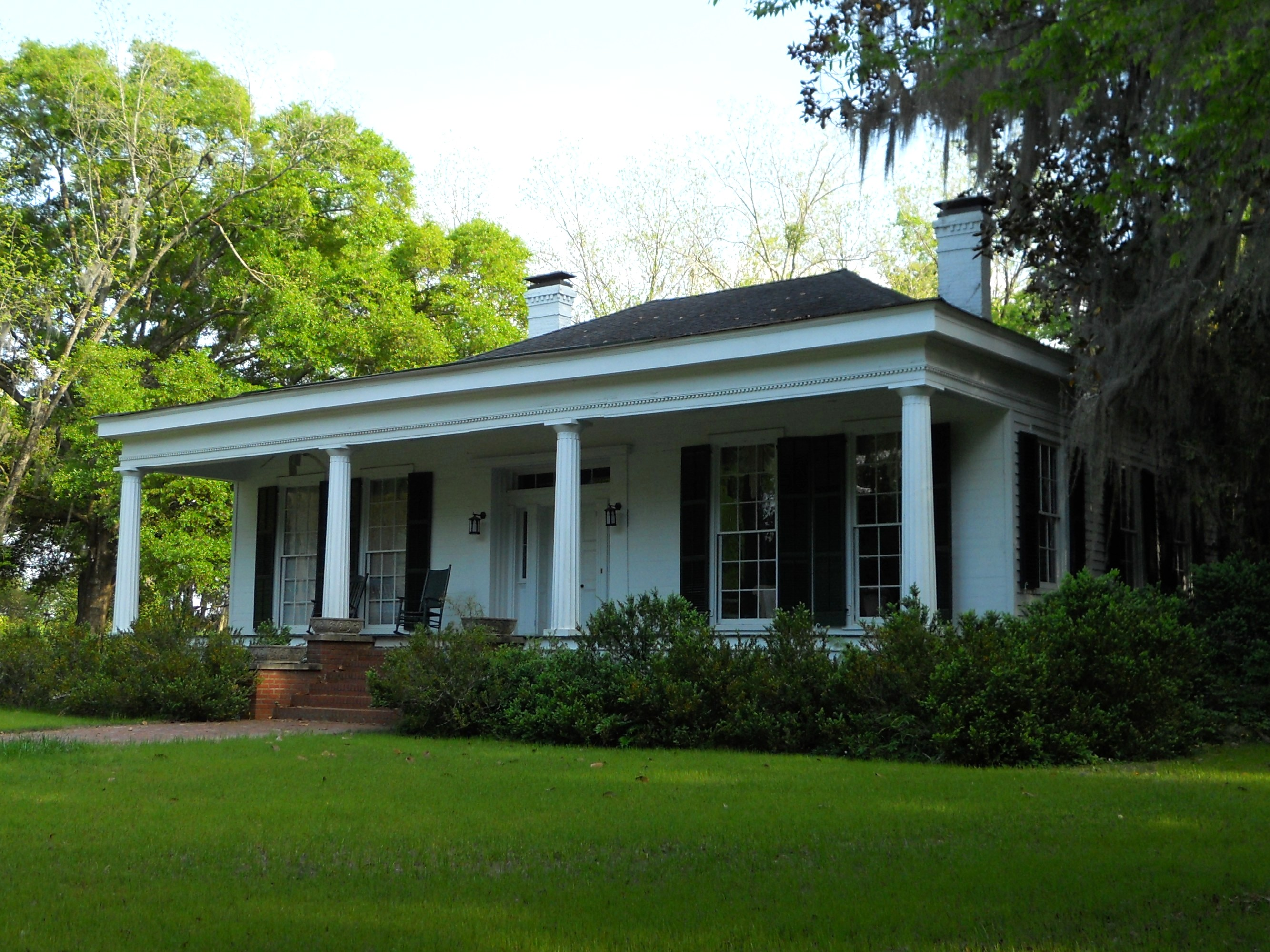
- The Samuel R. Pitts Plantation in 2011

- Location within Alabama Location within the United States
- Nearest city: Pittsview, Alabama
- Area: 223 acres (90 ha)
- Built: 1846
- Architectural style: Greek Revival
- NRHP reference No.: 92000819

Significant dates
- Added to NRHP: June 25, 1992
- Designated ARLH: August 16, 1991

The Samuel R. Pitts Plantation, also known as the Greenwood Plantation or the William J. Benton House, is a historic house on a plantation in Pittsview, Alabama, United States.

== History ==
The house was built in 1846 for Dr. John Benson Henry. It was later purchased by Samuel Eberharts.

The house was purchased by Samuel Rutherford Pitts in 1874. After he died, his brother Henry Bragg Pitts, moved into the house with his family, and it was later inherited by his daughter Evelyn, who lived there with her husband Richard Malcolm Mitchell. After her husband died in the 1930s, Evelyn lived in the house with her three unmarried sisters; they were joined by their brother in 1961.

The house was purchased by William R. Benson Sr. in 1989.

== Architectural significance ==
The house was designed in the Greek Revival architectural style. It has been listed on the National Register of Historic Places since June 25, 1992.
