= Old Girard High School =

- Girard High School
- U.S. National Register of Historic Places
- Interactive map of Girard High School
- Location: Sandfort Rd., Phenix City, Alabama
- Coordinates: 32°27′39″N 85°00′15″W
- Built: 1909
- MPS: Phenix City MRA
- NRHP reference No.: 83003480
- Added to NRHP: November 3, 1983

The Old Girard High School was a historic building in Phenix City, Alabama. It was built in 1909 on the site of Girard's first school dating from 1867. At first it housed only an elementary school, but expanded in 1923 to include a high school. The school closed in 1970 and was merged into Central High School. The building was a two-story Neoclassical structure built of brick. The façade had a central, gabled three-bay projection with entrances on each side. Windows were two-over-two double-hung sashes. A rear wing was added around 1950.

The building was listed on the National Register of Historic Places in 1983 and was demolished in 1994.
