= Kid Alley Residential Historic District =

- U.S. National Register of Historic Places
- U.S. Historic district
- Interactive map of Kid Alley Residential Historic District
- Location: 11th Ave. at 9th Pl., Phenix City, Alabama
- Coordinates: 32°27′52″N 85°00′27″W
- Built: 1885–1895
- MPS: Phenix City MRA
- NRHP reference No.: 83003482
- Added to NRHP: November 3, 1983

The Kid Alley Residential Historic District is a historic district in Phenix City, Alabama. Located in the Girard section of the city, Kid Alley was developed in 1895 as a middle-class neighborhood of Victorian rental houses. Of the original 12 houses, seven remain, ranging from shotguns to large cottages, all with elaborate scrollwork. The area gained its name from the large amount of children in the neighborhood's young families.

The district was listed on the National Register of Historic Places in 1983.
