= Snow Valley Residential Historic District =

- U.S. National Register of Historic Places
- U.S. Historic district
- Interactive map of Snow Valley Residential Historic District
- Location: 11th and 12th Sts. at 11th Ave., Phenix City, Alabama
- Coordinates: 32°28′04″N 85°00′29″W
- Built: 1883–1922
- MPS: Phenix City MRA
- NRHP reference No.: 83003487
- Added to NRHP: November 3, 1983

The Snow Valley Residential Historic District is a historic district in Phenix City, Alabama. Located in the Girard section of the city, the land was originally owned by Bavarian immigrant farmer Henry C. Herman. Herman sold all but 2 acres (0.81 ha) of the land in 1883. With further subdivisions of the land through the 1910s, a total of twelve houses were built, ranging from shotgun houses to larger cottages, most in either Greek Revival or Victorian style.

The district was listed on the National Register of Historic Places in 1983.
