= Upper Twentieth Street Residential Historic District =

- U.S. National Register of Historic Places
- U.S. Historic district
- Interactive map of Upper Twentieth Street Residential Historic District
- Location: 1201-1217 W. 20th St., Phenix City, Alabama
- Coordinates: 32°27′52″N 85°00′27″W
- Built: 1880–1925
- MPS: Phenix City MRA
- NRHP reference No.: 83003488
- Added to NRHP: November 3, 1983

The Upper Twentieth Street Residential Historic District is a historic district in Phenix City, Alabama. The land was acquired in 1880 by Scottish mill worker and merchant John Baird from his father-in-law, S. M. Ingersoll. Baird gave his daughters two lots, and each built a house on them. Merchant M. E. Edwards also built a house in the 1900s. The lots were eventually subdivided and sold, and the three cottages were joined by shotgun houses and bungalows.

The district was listed on the National Register of Historic Places in 1983.
