= Brooks–Hughes House =

Historic house in Alabama, United States

- Brooks-Hughes House
- U.S. National Register of Historic Places
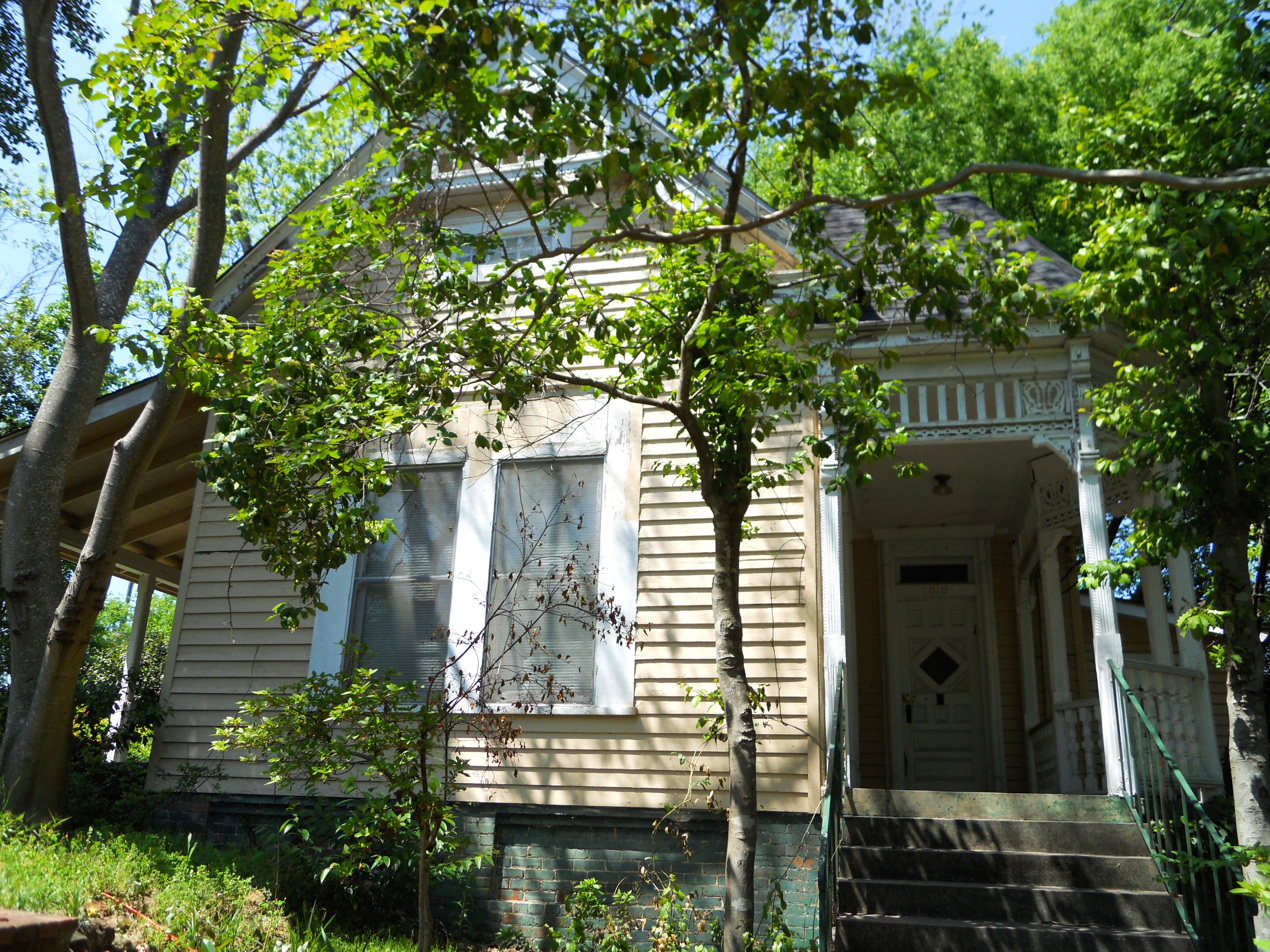
- The Brooks-Hughes House in 2011

- Location within Alabama Location within the United States
- Location: 1010 Sandfort Road, Phenix City, Alabama
- Coordinates: 32°27′33″N 85°0′29″W
- Area: less than one acre
- Built: 1897
- Architectural style: Late Victorian
- MPS: Phenix City MRA
- NRHP reference No.: 83003477
- Added to NRHP: November 3, 1983

The Brooks-Hughes House is a historic house in Phenix City, Alabama, U.S. It was built from 1897 to 1904 as a cottage for W. T. Hall. It has been listed on the National Register of Historic Places since November 3, 1983.
