= Hurtsboro Historic District =

- U.S. National Register of Historic Places
- U.S. Historic district
- Interactive map of Hurtsboro Historic District
- Location: Hurtsboro, Alabama
- Coordinates: 32°14′40″N 85°24′47″W
- Built: 1858–1952
- MPS: Phenix City MRA
- NRHP reference No.: 09000001
- Added to NRHP: October 19, 2009

The Hurtsboro Historic District is a historic district in Hurtsboro, Alabama. Hurtsboro was founded as Hurtsville in 1858 by Joel Hurt after the Mobile and Girard Railroad was built through western Russell County. The commercial core is centered along the railroad tracks; although all of the early frame commercial buildings were demolished by the 1960s, several 1890s–1920s buildings, including the 1890s Gin and Mill building and the circa 1910 Owens Mercantile block remain. The Greek Revival style Joel Hurt House is the oldest house in town. Although many of Hurtsboro's historic houses were destroyed in a 1981 tornado, a core of Greek Revival, Victorian, Bungalow, and Minimal Traditional houses remain.

The district was listed on the National Register of Historic Places in 2009.
