= William H. Denson =

American politician

William H. Denison
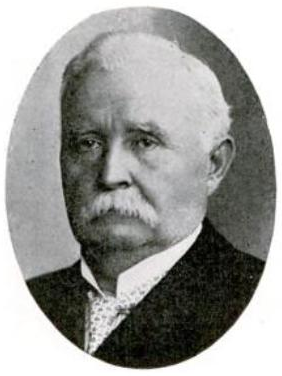

Member of the U.S. House of Representatives from Alabama's 7th district
- In office March 4, 1893 – March 3, 1895
- Preceded by: William H. Forney
- Succeeded by: Milford W. Howard

United States Attorney for the Middle District of Alabama United States Attorney for the Northern District of Alabama
- In office 1885–1889
- President: Grover Cleveland
- Preceded by: George Henry Craig
- Succeeded by: Lewis E. Parsons, Jr.

Member of the Alabama House of Representatives
- In office 1876–1885

Mayor of LaFayette
- In office 1874–1876

Personal details
- Born: William Henry Denson; March 4, 1846 Uchee, Alabama, U.S.
- Died: September 26, 1906 (aged 60) Birmingham, Alabama, U.S.
- Resting place: Elmwood Cemetery
- Party: Democratic

Military service
- Allegiance: Confederate States of America
- Branch/service: Confederate States Army
- Years of service: 1863–1865

William Henry Denson (March 4, 1846 – September 26, 1906) was an American lawyer, Confederate Civil War veteran, and politician who served one term as a U.S. representative from Alabama from 1893 to 1895.

== Biography ==
Born in Uchee, Alabama, Denson attended the common schools and the University of Alabama at Tuscaloosa. Denson left the University of Alabama in 1863 to join the Confederate States Army, worked on his father's farm and studied law. He was admitted to the bar in 1868 and commenced practice in Union Springs, Alabama, moved to LaFayette, Alabama, in October 1870.

There, he served as mayor of Lafayette in 1874, served as member of the State house of representatives in 1876, moved to Gadsden, Etowah County, in 1877 and continued the practice of his profession. He was appointed by President Cleveland United States district attorney for the northern and middle districts of Alabama and served from June 30, 1885, to June 3, 1889. He served as chairman of the Democratic State convention in 1890.

=== Congress ===
Denson was elected as a Democrat to the Fifty-third Congress (March 4, 1893 – March 3, 1895).

He was an unsuccessful candidate for renomination in 1894 and moved to Birmingham, Alabama, where he resumed the practice of law.

=== Death and burial ===
He died in Birmingham, Alabama and was buried in Elmwood Cemetery.

U.S. House of Representatives
Preceded by William H. Forney	Member of the U.S. House of Representatives from Alabama's 7th congressional district March 4, 1893 – March 3, 1895	Succeeded by Milford W. Howard
