= Glenn–Thompson Plantation =

Historic house in Alabama, United States

- U.S. National Register of Historic Places
- Alabama Register of Landmarks and Heritage
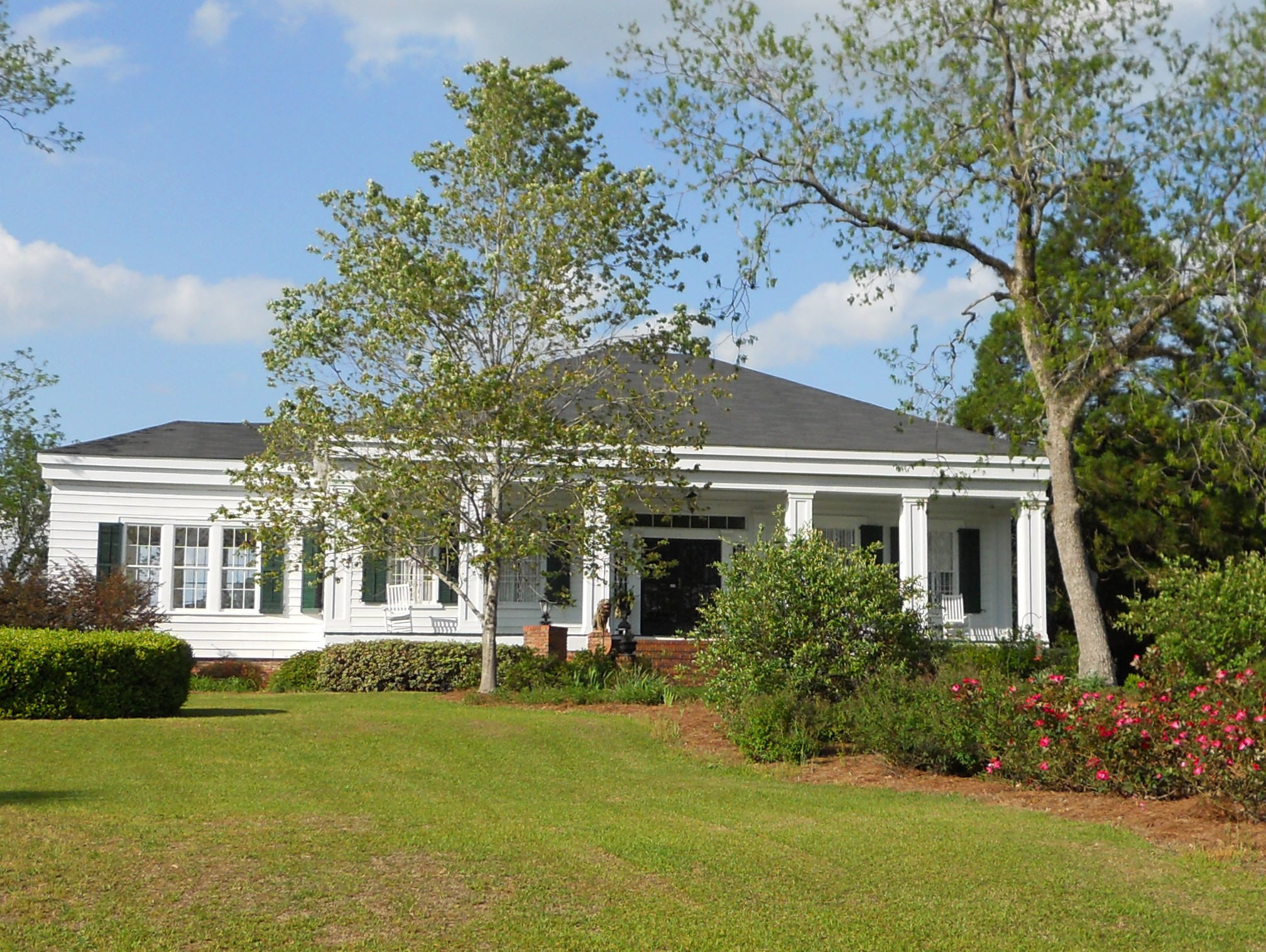
- The house in April 2011

- Location within Alabama Location within the United States
- Nearest city: Pittsview, Alabama
- Coordinates: 32°8′14″N 85°9′3″W
- Area: 10 acres (4.0 ha)
- Built: 1837
- Architectural style: Greek Revival
- NRHP reference No.: 80000735

Significant dates
- Added to NRHP: April 9, 1980
- Designated ARLH: October 19, 1979

The Glenn–Thompson Plantation (also known as Cedar Heights Plantation) is a historic plantation house near Pittsview in Russell County, Alabama. The house was built in 1837, five years after the Treaty of Cusseta which ceded Muscogee lands to the United States. It was built by Massilon McKendree Glenn, son of the founder of nearby Glennville, and an academic who was the president of the Board of Trustees of the Glennville Female Academy. Glenn traded the house and its lands to a nearby planter named George Hargraves Thompson in 1840. Thompson developed the land into a working plantation, and his son, Willis, was one of the first in the area to convert his lands to produce pecans.

The house has a hipped roof, which also covers the front portico. The portico is supported by six square columns below a plain entablature; the entablature is continued around the rest of the house. The double-leaf front door is surrounded by sidelights and a transom, and flanked by 2 six-over-six sash windows on either side. The house originally had a central hall with two rooms on either side. In 1840, a rear addition was built, adding four main rooms and a shed-roofed patio. Original wood fireplace mantels are present in the original four rooms, though they have been sealed with marble hearths. A sunroom was added to the west of the house in the 1940s, and is accessed through an arched entry in the front left room. A kitchen was originally attached to the rear of the house via a breezeway, but was moved and repurposed as a horse barn.

The house was listed on the Alabama Register of Landmarks and Heritage in 1979 and the National Register of Historic Places in 1980.
