= Smith Residential Historic District =

- U. H. Smith Residential Historic District
- U.S. National Register of Historic Places
- U.S. Historic district
- Interactive map of U. H. Smith Residential Historic District
- Location: 20th St., 7th Ave., and 6th Court, Phenix City, Alabama
- Coordinates: 32°28′47″N 85°00′04″W
- Built: 1880–1910
- MPS: Phenix City MRA
- NRHP reference No.: 83003486
- Added to NRHP: November 3, 1983

The U. H. Smith Residential Historic District is a historic district in Phenix City, Alabama. The district consists of six late 19th century houses, centered on the house of U. H. Smith, who served as mayor of Phenix City from 1888 to 1891. The houses are primarily Victorian, some with Greek Revival details.

The district was listed on the National Register of Historic Places in 1983.
