= Lower Twentieth Street Residential Historic District =

- U.S. National Register of Historic Places
- U.S. Historic district
- Interactive map of Lower Twentieth Street Residential Historic District
- Location: 20th St. from 2nd to 6th Aves., Phenix City, Alabama
- Coordinates: 32°28′47″N 84°59′55″W
- Built: 1880–1920
- MPS: Phenix City MRA
- NRHP reference No.: 83003483
- Added to NRHP: November 3, 1983

The Lower Twentieth Street Residential Historic District is a historic district in Phenix City, Alabama. The district is a four-block area of Victorian houses developed between 1875 and the 1920s, coinciding with the expansion of cotton mills in Phenix City and neighboring Columbus, Georgia. Some smaller shotgun houses were built, but most are larger, middle-class dwellings which have ornamental gingerbread and other elaborate trim.

The district was listed on the National Register of Historic Places in 1983.
