= Phenix City Post Office Building =

- U.S. National Register of Historic Places
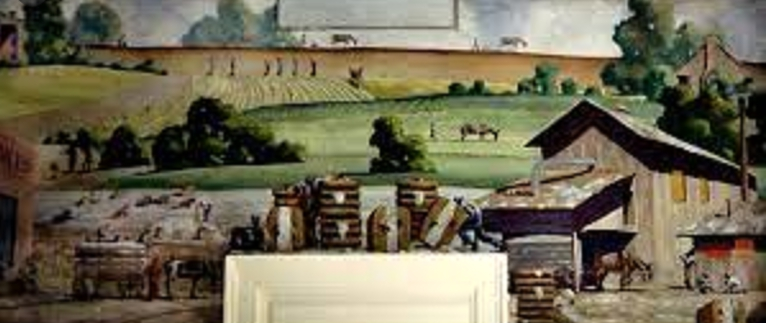
- Mural Cotton by John Kelly Fitzpatrick
- Interactive map of Phenix City Post Office Building
- Location: 500 14th St., Phenix City, Alabama
- Built: 1938
- NRHP reference No.: 100007192
- Added to NRHP: November 30, 2021

The Phenix City Post Office Building is a historic building in Phenix City, Alabama. It was built in 1938 by the Public Works Administration. The building was used as a post office until 1963, when it was donated to the city for use as a library. The Phenix City–Russell County Library occupied the building until 1998 when a new, larger building was completed. A private museum was operated in the building until 2017, when it was sold to the county.

The building is a one-story brick Colonial Revival structure, built in a similar style to other New Deal post offices. It has a hipped roof and central cupola, with a five-bay façade. The central entrance is slightly recessed, with Doric columns supporting an entablature and brick arch featuring a stone bald eagle. On the inside, the mural Cotton, painted by Alabama artist John Kelly Fitzpatrick is on a wall of the postmaster's office.

The building was listed on the National Register of Historic Places in 2021.
