= Brownville–Summerville Historic District =

- U.S. National Register of Historic Places
- U.S. Historic district
- Interactive map of Brownville–Summerville Historic District
- Location: Roughly bounded by 15th and 23rd Sts. and 6th and 11th Aves., Phenix City, Alabama
- Coordinates: 32°28′40″N 85°00′17″W
- Built: 1880–1930
- MPS: Phenix City MRA
- NRHP reference No.: 83003479
- Added to NRHP: November 3, 1983

The Brownville–Summerville Historic District is a historic district in Phenix City, Alabama. The district covers approximately 87 acres (35 ha) of mostly residential area to the west and northwest of the city's commercial core. The earliest houses in the district date from circa 1870, and are either Greek Revival or Saddlebag cottages. Beginning in the 1880s, many Victorian cottages were built by employees at the town's cotton mills and iron works. In the 1920s and 1930s, bungalows continued to be built. Several commercial buildings, most brick and dating from the 1920s, are scattered throughout the district.

The district was listed on the National Register of Historic Places in 1983.
