= Uchee Methodist Church =

Historic church in Alabama, United States

- U.S. National Register of Historic Places
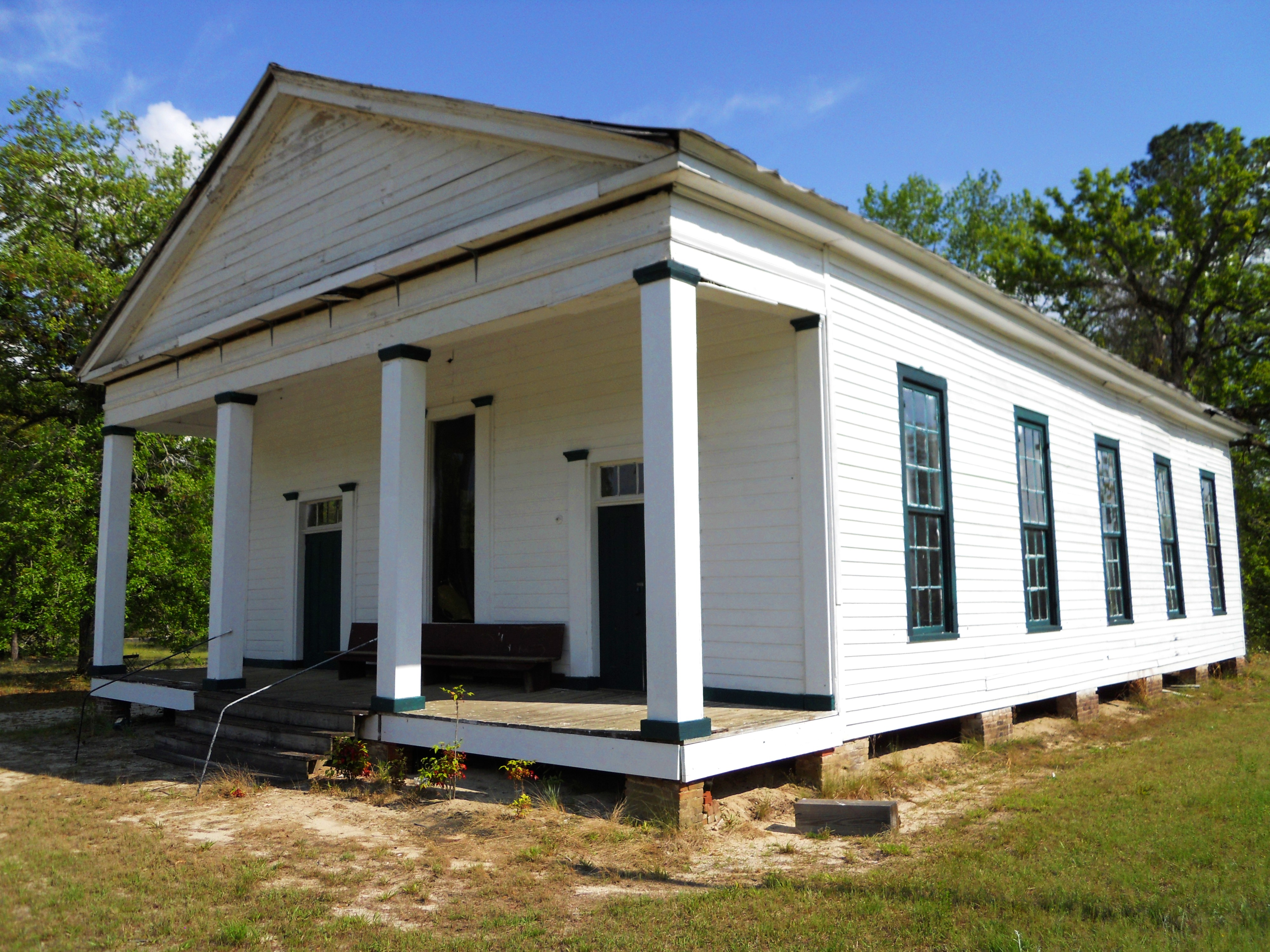

- Location within Alabama Location within the United States
- Nearest city: Uchee, Alabama
- Coordinates: 32°21′12″N 85°19′53″W
- Area: 5.1 acres (2.1 ha)
- Built: 1859
- Architect: Johnson, Laban Scott
- Architectural style: Greek Revival
- NRHP reference No.: 97000654
- Added to NRHP: July 3, 1997

Uchee Methodist Church is a historic Greek Revival style church in Uchee, Alabama. The building was added to the National Register of Historic Places in 1997.

== History ==
The Methodist congregation at Uchee dates back to 1833; a log church was built in 1836, the first pastor of which was David E. McIntyre. During the second year of his tenure the congregation consisted of 124 white and 53 black members. The structure which now stands was built by L. S. Johnson in c. 1859 in the Greek Revival style, which was popular in Alabama during the antebellum.

The church continued to thrive into the 20th century, and underwent significant alterations in 1980 which, among other things, removed the separated rear section which had originally been used by the segregated black congregants. Declining membership led the congregation to disperse and the church to close in the mid-1980s; the former congregants, however, continued to maintain the church building for some years afterwards.
