= Morgan–Curtis House =

Historic house in Alabama, United States

- Morgan-Curtis House
- U.S. National Register of Historic Places
- Alabama Register of Landmarks and Heritage
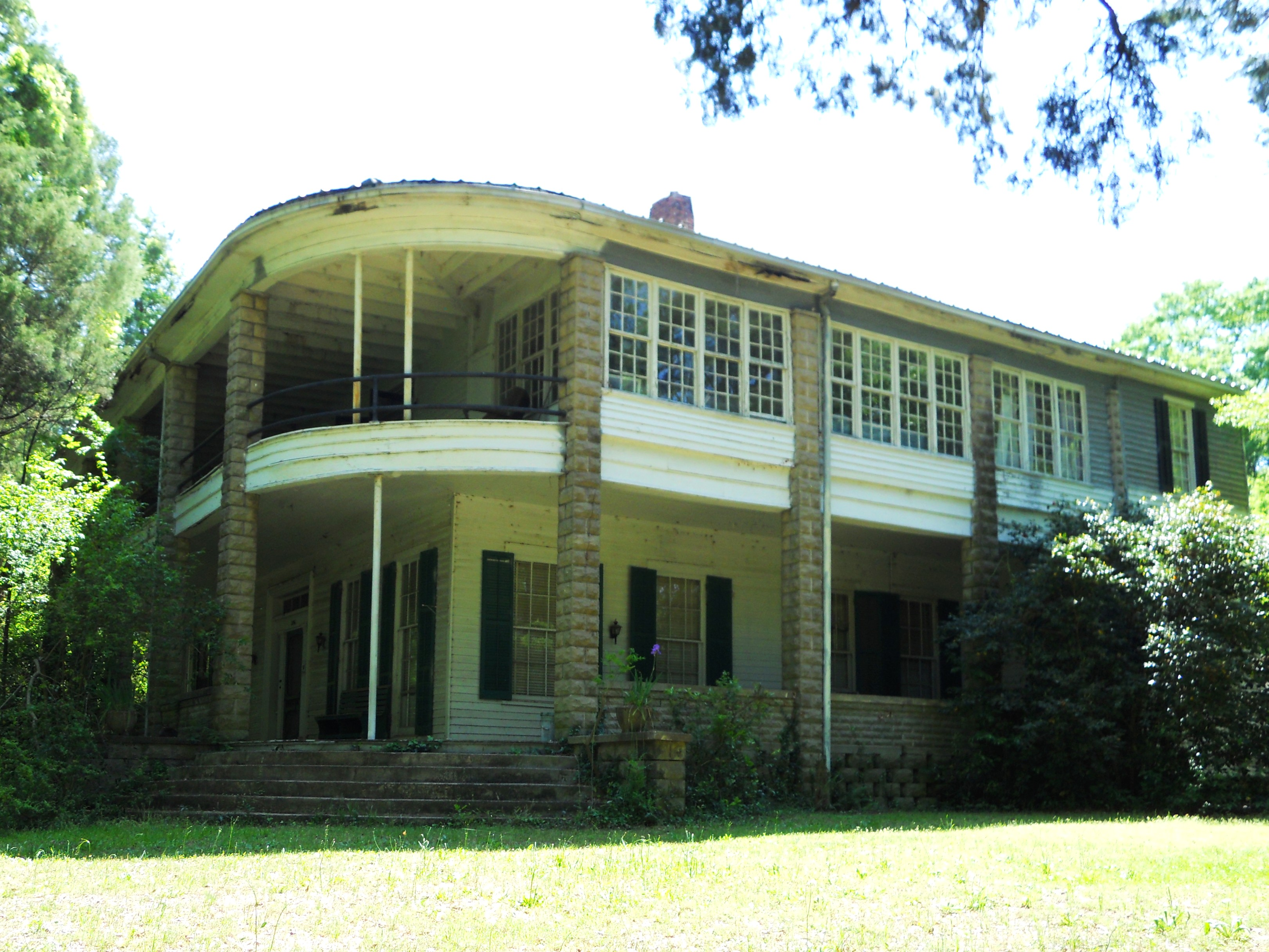
- The Morgan-Curtis House in 2011

- Location within Alabama Location within the United States
- Location: 1815 Abbott Drive, Phenix City, Alabama
- Coordinates: 32°28′5″N 85°1′8″W
- Area: less than one acre
- Built: 1914
- Architectural style: Classical Revival
- MPS: Phenix City MRA
- NRHP reference No.: 83003484

Significant dates
- Added to NRHP: November 3, 1983
- Designated ARLH: October 19, 1979

The Morgan-Curtis House is a historic house in Phenix City, Alabama, U.S. It was built in 1914 for Dr. David Elias Morgan, a Welsh-born physician. It has been listed on the National Register of Historic Places since November 3, 1983.
