= Uchee, Alabama =

- Unincorporated community
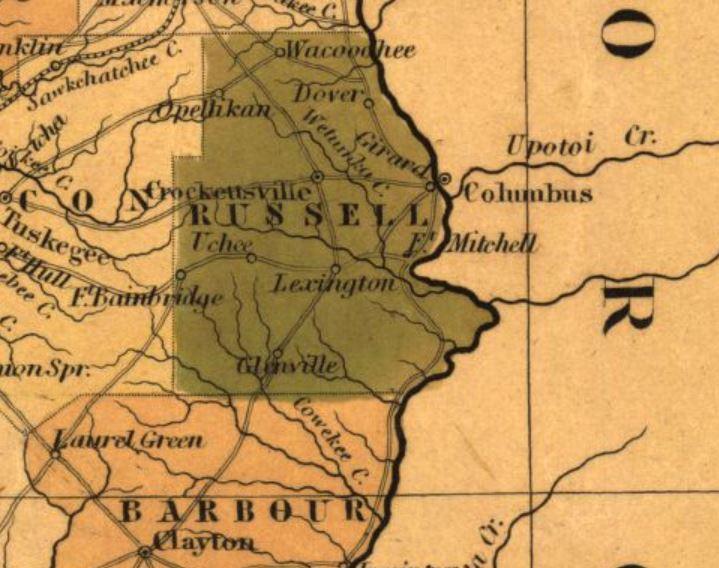
- Henry Schenck Tanner's 1841 map showing Uchee located along the Federal Road

- Location within Alabama Location within the United States
- Coordinates: 32°21′03″N 85°21′53″W
- Country: United States
- State: Alabama
- County: Russell
- Elevation: 541 ft (165 m)
- Time zone: UTC-6 (Central (CST))
  - Summer (DST): UTC-5 (CDT)
- Area code: 334
- GNIS feature ID: 157184

Uchee, also known as Spains Stand, is an unincorporated community in Russell County, Alabama, United States.

== History ==
Uchee is named after the nearby Uchee Creek, which in turn is named for the Yuchi tribe. The word "yuchi" probably means "at a distance" in the Yuchi language, with yu meaning "at a distance" and chi meaning "sitting down". The Yuchi lived in the area around present day Russell County, Alabama and Fort Benning, Georgia, before being removed to the Indian Territory. The Uchee Methodist Church is listed on the National Register of Historic Places. A post office was operated in Uchee from 1835 to 1907.

== Demographics ==
Historical population
Census	Pop.	Note	%±
1880	63		—
U.S. Decennial Census

Uchee appeared on the 1880 U.S. Census as an unincorporated community of 63 residents. This was the only time it appeared on the census rolls.

== Notable people ==
- Johnny Allen, R&B arranger and pianist
- William Henry Denson, U.S. Representative from 1893 to 1895
