= Pittsview, Alabama =

- Unincorporated community
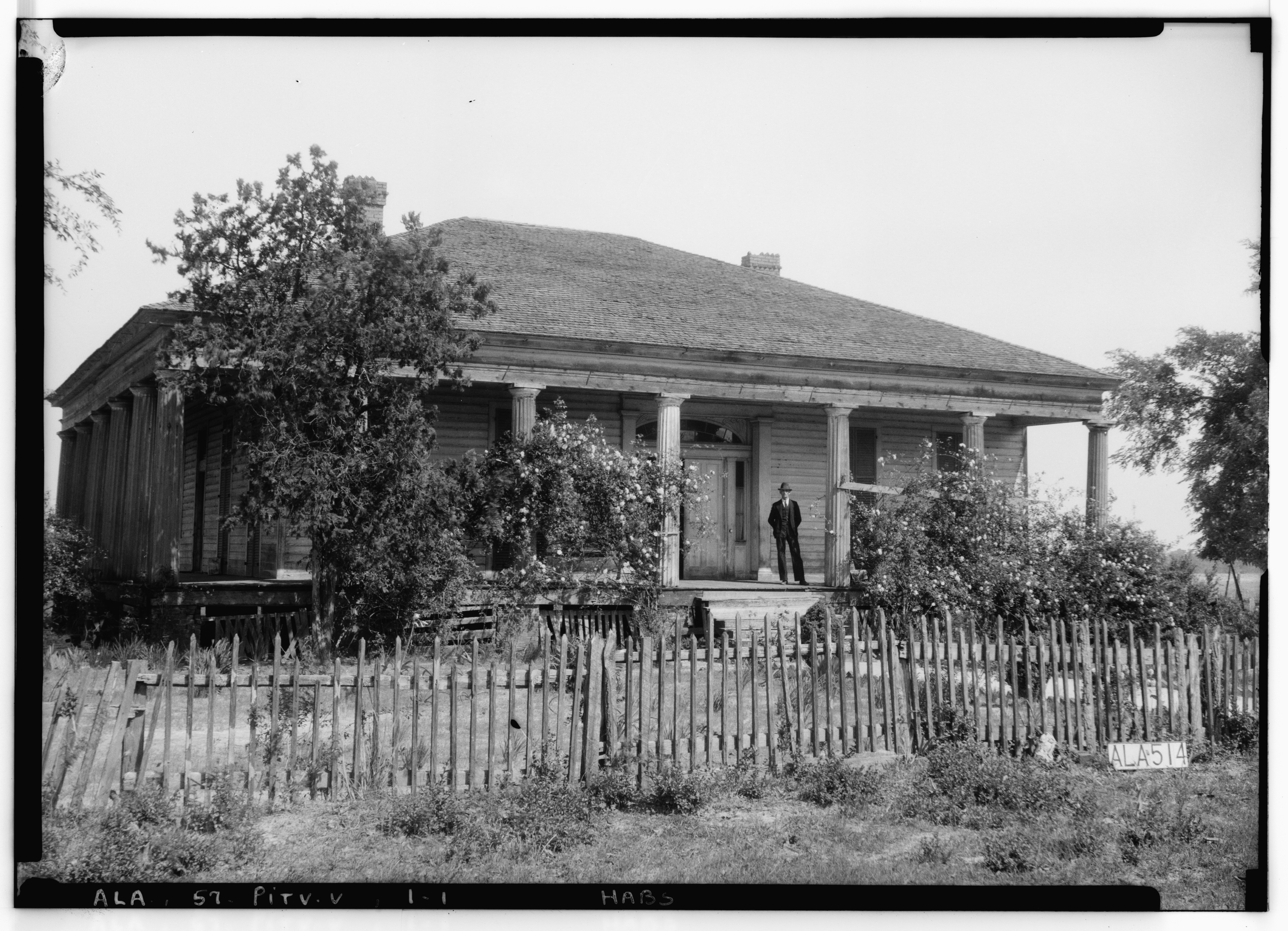
- Richardson-Quarles-Comer House, taken in 1936 as part of the Historic American Buildings Survey

- Location within the state of Alabama Pittsview, Alabama (the United States)
- Coordinates: 32.18845°N 85.16384°W
- Country: United States
- State: Alabama
- County: Russell
- Elevation: 239 ft (73 m)
- Time zone: UTC-6 (Central (CST))
  - Summer (DST): UTC-5 (CDT)
- ZIP code: 36871
- Area code: 334

Pittsview, at one time known as Pittsboro, is an unincorporated community in Russell County, Alabama, United States.

== Geography ==
Pittsview is located at 32.18845°N 85.16384°W. The community is located in rural southern Russell County. U.S. Route 431 passes just west of the community as a four-lane divided highway, leading north 25 mi (40 km) to Phenix City, the Russell County seat, and south 23 mi (37 km) to Eufaula. It sits at an elevation of 239 feet (73 m).

== Gallery ==
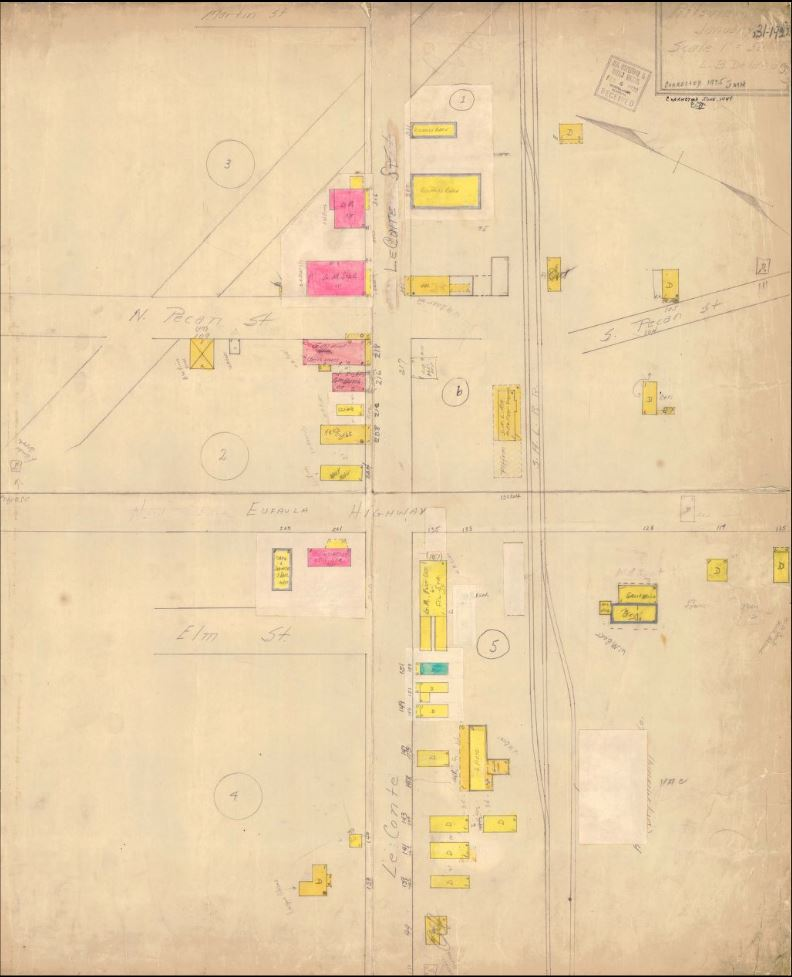
1922 fire insurance map of Pittsview
