= Joel Hurt House =

Historic house in Alabama, United States

- U.S. National Register of Historic Places
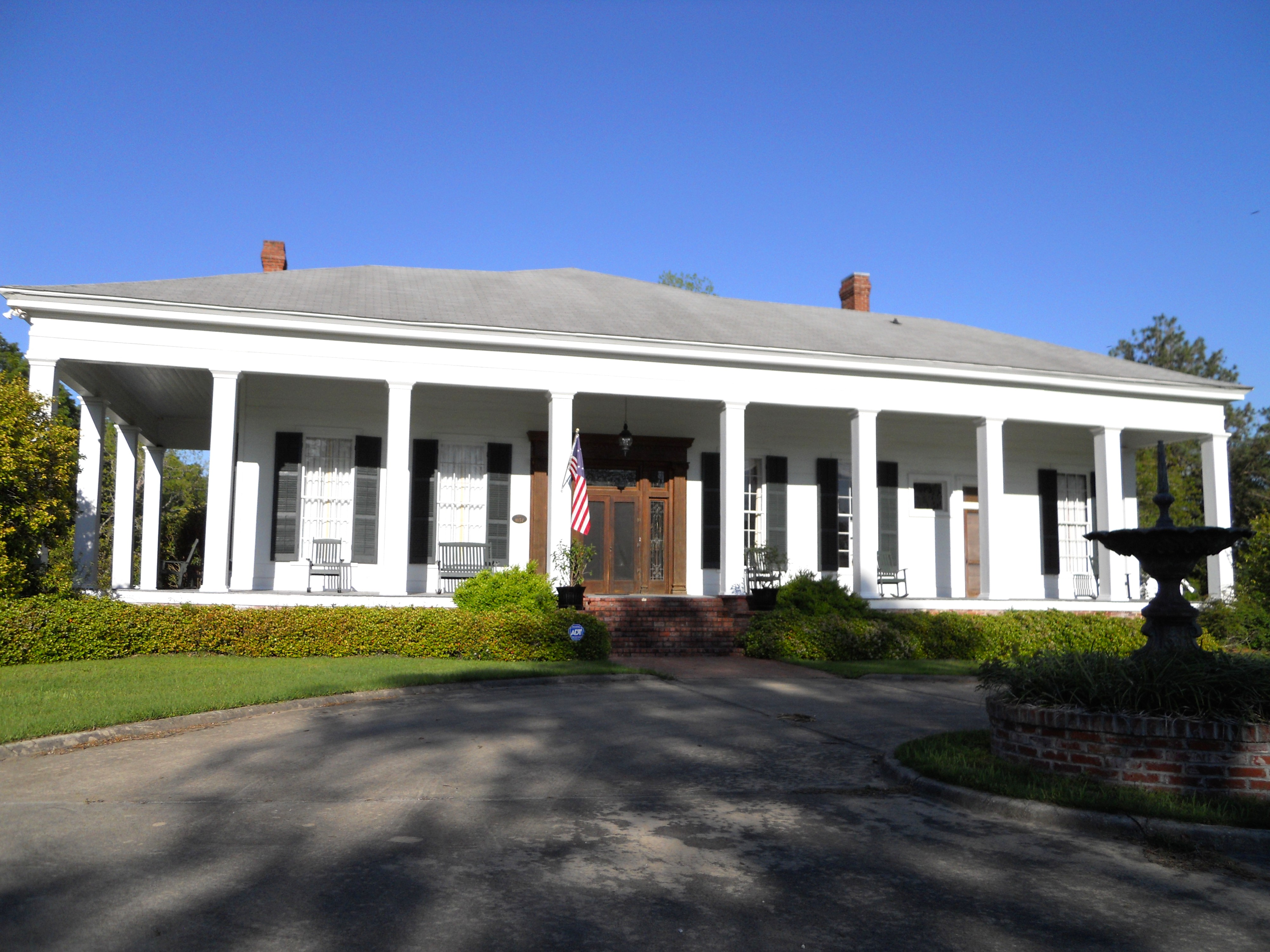
- The Joel Hurt House in 2011

- Location within Alabama Location within the United States
- Location: Church Street, Hurtsboro, Alabama
- Coordinates: 32°14′25″N 85°24′38″W
- Area: 5 acres (2.0 ha)
- Built: 1857
- Architectural style: Greek Revival
- NRHP reference No.: 05000834
- Added to NRHP: August 11, 2005

The Joel Hurt House is a historic house in Hurtsboro, Alabama, U.S. It was built in 1857–1858 for Joel Hurt, his wife, Lucy Apperson Long Hurt, and three sons. During the American Civil War of 1861–1865, the three sons served in the Confederate States Army, and one of them was killed in combat. (Another son, Joel Hurt, became a developer in Atlanta.) After the war, Lucy's sister and her husband, Edward Norphlet Brown, who also served as the first mayor of Hurtsboro, lived in the house. In 1900, it was acquired by his son-in-law, Dr. Walter B. Hendrick, who lived there with his wife Margaret until his death in 1941; she went on to live in the house until her death in 1968. It was inherited by their daughter Kate, who lived there until her death in 1997. It has been listed on the National Register of Historic Places since August 11, 2005.
