= Girard, Alabama =

- Location within Alabama
- Coordinates: 32°27′24″N 85°00′16″W
- Country: United States
- State: Alabama
- County: Russell
- Elevation: 351 ft (107 m)
- Time zone: UTC-6 (Central (CST))
  - Summer (DST): UTC-5 (CDT)
- Area code: 334
- GNIS feature ID: 119451
- Girard Historic District
- U.S. National Register of Historic Places
- MPS: Phenix City MRA
- NRHP reference No.: 83003481
- Added to NRHP: November 3, 1983

Girard, Alabama was a city in the far north-east corner of Russell County, Alabama across the Chattahoochee River from Columbus, Georgia.

== History ==
Named after Philadelphia-based banker Stephen Girard, who had purchased much of the Muscogee territory that would become Russell County, the town of Girard served as the county's first seat from 1832 to 1839. It was incorporated around 1833. Girard was the site of Fort Ingersoll, built during the Creek War of 1836 to protect white interests in the area. The town saw much of the fighting in the 1865 Battle of Columbus, culminating in the burning of the Dillingham Street bridge by retreating Confederates, and the eventual capture of Columbus.

After Alabama prohibited alcohol sales in 1915, Girard became a center of bootlegging. Even after prohibition had ended, Girard and Phenix City remained known for gambling and vice establishments, fueled by the growth of Fort Benning across the river.

In 1923, Girard merged with neighboring Phenix City. In 1933, the boundary of Russell County was moved north to take in all of Phenix City that had previously been in Lee County.

== Historic district ==
The Girard Historic District encompasses approximately 23 acres (9.3 ha) of Girard's downtown. The commercial section, closer to the river, contains several early 1900s buildings, including the Renaissance Revival Citizens' Bank, built in 1909 to control the illegal liquor trade. The Collins–Scott House, built in 1852 in Greek Revival style, is believed to be the oldest house in Russell County. Several shotgun houses built to house workers at the cotton mills, and more ornate Victorian cottages run up the hill from the river. The district was listed on the National Register of Historic Places in 1983.

== Demographics ==
Historical population
Census	Pop.	Note	%±
1850	748		—
1900	3,840		—
1910	4,215		9.8%
1920	4,942		17.2%
U.S. Decennial Census

Girard first appeared on the 1850 U.S. Census as an incorporated community of 748 residents. Oddly, despite being a large center of population for the time, exceeding an estimated 1,000 residents after 1860, it was not separately returned on the census again until 1900 when it had nearly 4,000 residents.

For reference purposes, the population of the Girard Beat/Precinct, which included the town between 1870 and 1900 was as follows: 1870=3,984; 1880=4,637; 1890=5,486; 1900=6,440.

It formally ceased to exist in 1923 with its merger with Phenix City.

== Notable people ==
Albert C. Baker, who was the only person to serve on the Arizona Territorial Supreme Court and the Arizona Supreme Court, was from Girard.
