= Phenix City, Alabama =

City in Alabama, United States

- City
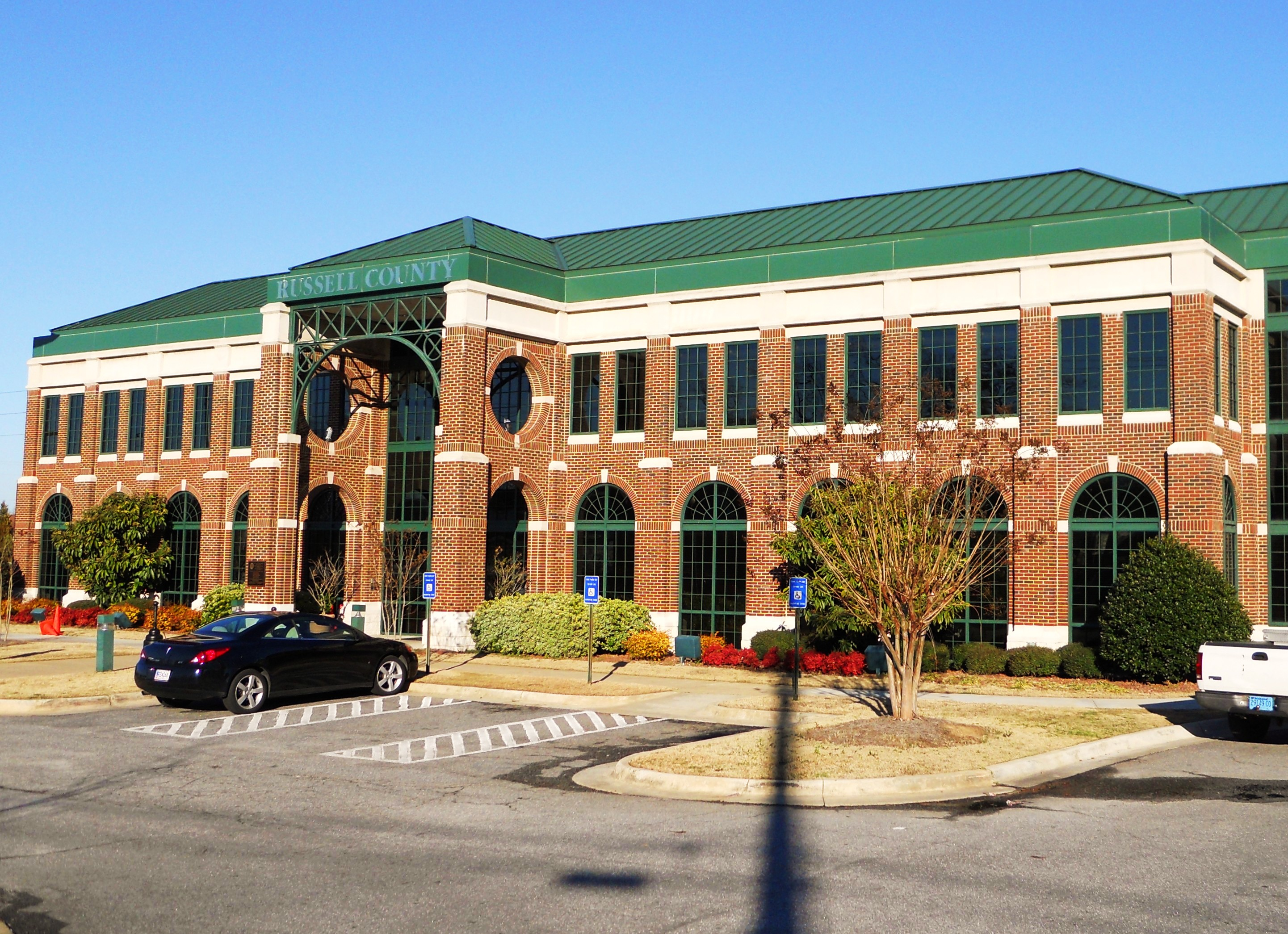
- Russell County Courthouse, Phenix City

- Flag Seal

- Coordinates: 32°28′15″N 85°00′10″W
- Country: United States
- State: Alabama
- Counties: Russell, Lee
- Established: February 23, 1883

Government
  - Mayor: Eddie N. Lowe (D)

Area
  - Total: 28.25 sq mi (73.17 km^{2})
  - Land: 28.14 sq mi (72.87 km^{2})
  - Water: 0.11 sq mi (0.29 km^{2})
- Elevation: 443 ft (135 m)

Population (2020)
  - Total: 38,816
  - Density: 1,379.6/sq mi (532.65/km^{2})
- Time zones: UTC-6 (CST (de jure))
  - Summer (DST): UTC-5 (CDT (de jure))
- UTC-5 (EST (de facto))
  - Summer (DST): UTC-4 (EDT (de facto))
- ZIP codes: 36867-36870
- Area code: 334
- FIPS code: 01-59472
- GNIS feature ID: 2404510
- Website: phenixcityal.gov

Phenix City is a city in Lee and Russell counties in the U.S. state of Alabama, and the county seat of Russell County with northern and western parts crossing over into neighboring Lee County. As of the 2020 census, the population of the city was 38,817.

Phenix City lies immediately west across the Chattahoochee River from Columbus, Georgia and observes Eastern Time on a de facto basis (in contrast to the rest of Alabama, which observes Central Time) due to Phenix City's strong economic ties to Columbus. Most of Phenix City is included in the Columbus Metropolitan Statistical Area, and the remainder is in Lee County and therefore included in the Auburn, Alabama Metropolitan Statistical Area. The entire city is part of the Columbus-Auburn-Opelika Combined Statistical Area.

In 2007, BusinessWeek named Phenix City the nation's no. 1 best affordable suburb to raise a family. It is home to Chattahoochee Valley Community College, a public, two-year college with an acceptance rate of 100%. Troy University has a satellite campus in Phenix City. It is also home to Phenix Lumber Company, which has been described as the deadliest workplace in the United States because of its high rate of accidents and safety violations.

As of 2023, the mayor is Eddie N. Lowe, the city's first black mayor elected by the public. The city manager, who holds the task of organizational matters, is Wallace Hunter.

== History ==
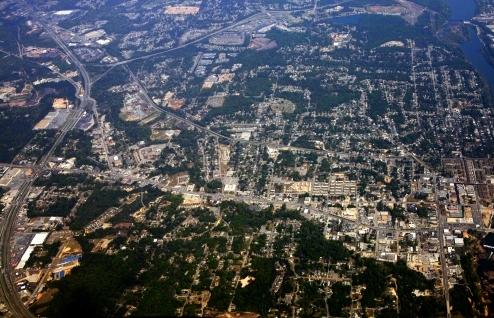
Aerial view of Phenix City

What some claim was the last battle of the American Civil War, the Battle of Columbus, took place here on April 16, 1865, in Phenix City, then known as Girard. Union General James Wilson was met with Confederate opposition as he crossed the Chattahoochee River in an attempt to destroy the military industry of Columbus, Georgia.

Phenix City was initially two towns bordering each other on the north and south. On the south side was Girard, in Russell County, and the town of Brownville, on the north side, which was entirely within Lee County. Because a community in Tuscaloosa County already claimed the name of Brownville, post office officials insisted on the name of "Lively". To compound the confusion, the nearby railroad depot was called Knight's Station. Because residents preferred Brownville, on the 1880 U.S. census, it was listed as both Brownville and Lively. It was formally incorporated by the legislature on February 23, 1883.

Within the decade, the name would be changed to Phenix (or Phenix City), although some misspellings had it as "Phoenix". It was not clear if it was named for Phenix Mills in nearby Columbus, Georgia or for the fabled bird. It appeared as Phenix City on the 1890 U.S. census and was incorporated as such on February 19, 1897, by the state legislature. The city's official website displays the mythical phoenix, while the city's seal also depicts a phoenix burning up in its nest. The 'Our Community/History' page confirms the uncertainty behind the name: "Although no definitive source reveals why this name was chosen."

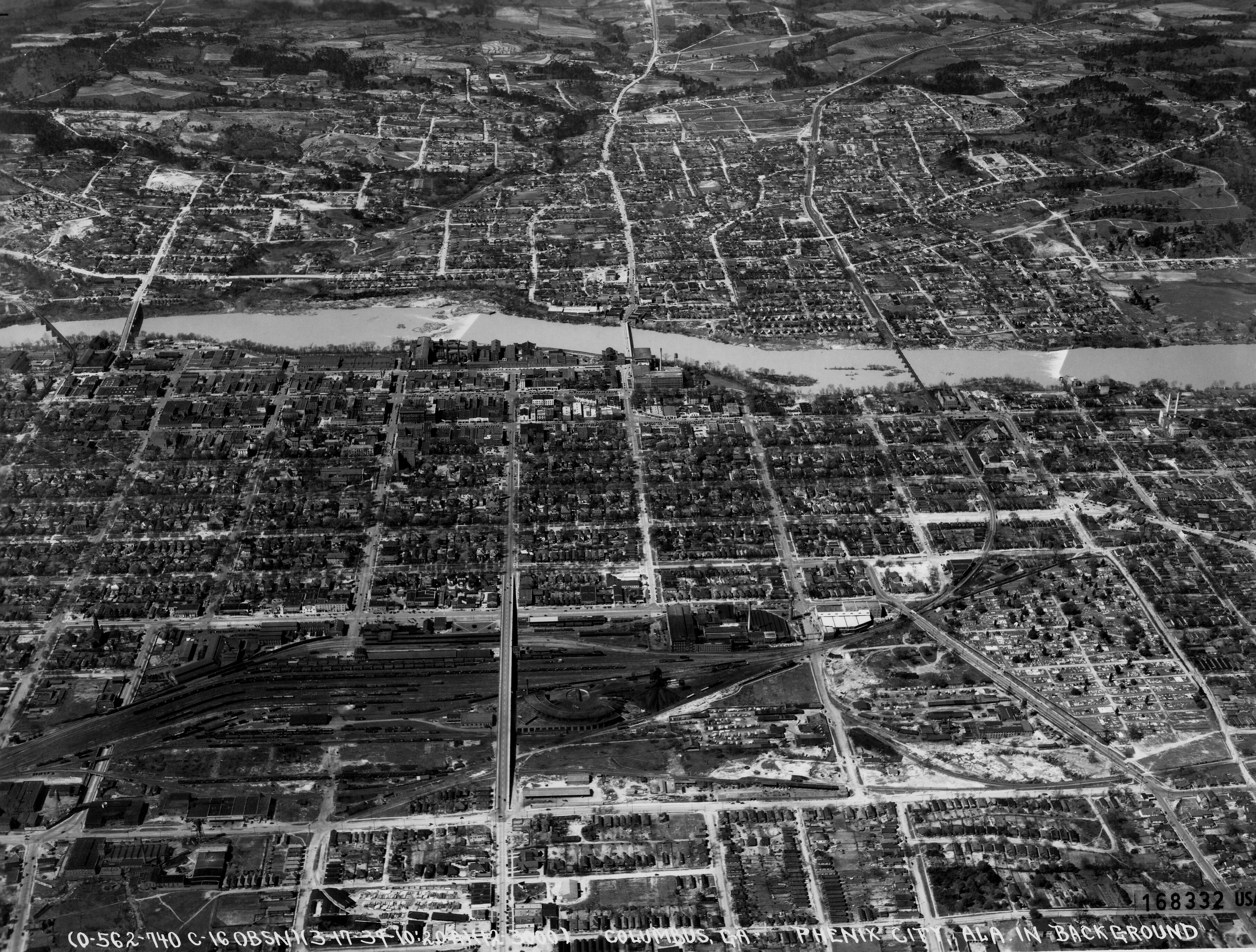
Phenix City on 7 March 1939

On August 9, 1923, Russell County's neighboring Girard (which made up most of current downtown Phenix City) and Lee County's Phenix City formally merged, keeping the name of Phenix City. Because the consolidated city still remained divided into two counties, in 1932, the Lee County portion was moved entirely into Russell County (also cited for the redraw was to account for population shifts involved in the Auburn University opening and expansion). Lee County received the rural segment at Marvyn as compensation, which was formerly in Russell County's northwest corner.

In 1926, the Russell County portion of Phenix City was designated the second county seat (the seat from 1868 had been at rural Seale). In 1934/35, Phenix City then became the sole county seat.

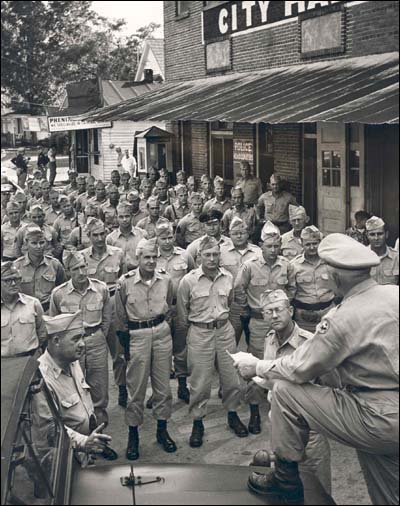
National guard in Phenix in 1955.

Phenix City was notorious during the 1940s and 1950s for being a haven for organized crime, prostitution, and gambling. Many of its customers came from the United States Army training center at Fort Benning, Georgia. The leaders of the crime syndicate in Phenix City were Jimmie Matthews and Hoyt Shepherd. Albert Patterson, from Phenix City, was elected to become attorney general of Alabama on a platform of reforming the city, but was shot and killed on June 18, 1954, outside his office on 5th Ave, north of 14th Street. On July 22, 1954, a limited state of martial law was declared in Russell County, Alabama, by Governor Gordon Persons which lasted till January 17, 1955. As a result, the city had a negative reputation, and many people still associate this legacy with Phenix City. The Tragedy and the Triumph of Phenix City, Alabama by Margaret Ann Barnes chronicles these events, which led the small town to be known as "Sin City, USA". The bordertown was the subject of an acclaimed film, The Phenix City Story, made in 1955.

In 1955, it won the All-America City Award from the National Municipal League.

Despite the city having been entirely annexed into Russell County in 1932, the growth of the city has spread northward back into Lee County, where it first appeared on 1980 U.S. Census records. As of 2010, nearly 4,200 residents (out of almost 33,000) reside in the Lee County portion.

== Geography ==
Phenix City is the easternmost settlement in the state of Alabama which officially is a part of the Central Time Zone, but it and some other nearby areas unofficially observe Eastern Time, as these areas are part of the metropolitan area of the considerably larger city of Columbus, Georgia, which is in the Eastern Time Zone and adjacent to the city across the Chattahoochee River to the east.

Several major highways run through Phenix City, namely U.S. routes 80, 280, and 431. U.S. Route 80 runs through the northern and western parts of the city, leading west 44 mi (71 km) to Tuskegee and northeast to Columbus, Georgia. U.S. 280 runs through the western part of the city from northwest to southeast, leading northwest 27 mi (43 km) to Opelika and southeast into Columbus. U.S. 431 runs north to south to the west of the city, concurrent with US 280, which it follows to Opelika, and leads south 47 mi (76 km) to Eufaula.

According to the U.S. Census Bureau, the city has a total area of 24.8 square miles (64 km^{2}), of which 24.6 square miles (64 km^{2}) is land and 0.2 square miles (0.52 km^{2}) (0.61%) is water.

=== Climate ===
The climate in this area is characterized by relatively high temperatures and evenly distributed precipitation throughout the year. According to the Köppen Climate Classification system, Phenix City has a humid subtropical climate, abbreviated "Cfa" on climate maps.

Climate data for Phenix City, Alabama
Month	Jan	Feb	Mar	Apr	May	Jun	Jul	Aug	Sep	Oct	Nov	Dec	Year
Mean daily maximum °F (°C)	57 (14)	61 (16)	69 (21)	77 (25)	84 (29)	90 (32)	92 (33)	91 (33)	86 (30)	77 (25)	68 (20)	59 (15)	76 (24)
Mean daily minimum °F (°C)	36 (2)	39 (4)	45 (7)	52 (11)	61 (16)	69 (21)	72 (22)	71 (22)	66 (19)	54 (12)	44 (7)	38 (3)	54 (12)
Average precipitation inches (mm)	4.1 (100)	4.5 (110)	5.7 (140)	4.1 (100)	3.8 (97)	3.9 (99)	5.3 (130)	4 (100)	3.3 (84)	2.3 (58)	3.6 (91)	4.5 (110)	49.1 (1,250)
Source: Weatherbase

== Religion ==
Phenix City is home to many places of worship, though there are more Baptist churches than any other denomination. Other denominations include:

- Christianity
  - Methodist
  - Pentecostal
  - Presbyterian
  - Roman Catholicism
  - Seventh-day Adventist
  - The Church of Jesus Christ of Latter-day Saints
- Judaism

== Demographics ==
Historical population
Census	Pop.	Note	%±
1880	2,224		—
1890	3,700		66.4%
1900	4,163		12.5%
1910	4,555		9.4%
1920	5,432		19.3%
1930	13,862		155.2%
1940	15,351		10.7%
1950	23,305		51.8%
1960	27,630		18.6%
1970	25,281		−8.5%
1980	26,928		6.5%
1990	25,312		−6.0%
2000	28,265		11.7%
2010	32,822		16.1%
2020	38,816		18.3%
2025 (est.)	38,344	▼	−1.2%
U.S. Decennial Census; 2018 Estimate

=== Racial and ethnic composition ===
Phenix City city, Alabama – Racial and ethnic composition Note: the US Census treats Hispanic/Latino as an ethnic category. This table excludes Latinos from the racial categories and assigns them to a separate category. Hispanics/Latinos may be of any race.
Race / Ethnicity (NH = Non-Hispanic)	Pop 2000	Pop 2010	Pop 2020	% 2000	% 2010	% 2020
White alone (NH)	14,788	15,391	15,525	52.32%	46.89%	40.00%
Black or African American alone (NH)	12,645	15,162	18,795	44.74%	46.19%	48.42%
Native American or Alaska Native alone (NH)	57	94	100	0.20%	0.29%	0.26%
Asian alone (NH)	143	213	366	0.51%	0.65%	0.94%
Native Hawaiian or Pacific Islander alone (NH)	3	51	61	0.01%	0.16%	0.16%
Other race alone (NH)	37	30	145	0.13%	0.09%	0.37%
Mixed race or Multiracial (NH)	171	565	1,513	0.60%	1.72%	3.90%
Hispanic or Latino (any race)	421	1,316	2,311	1.49%	4.01%	5.95%
Total	28,265	32,822	38,816	100.00%	100.00%	100.00%

=== 2020 census ===
As of the 2020 census, Phenix City had a population of 38,816. The median age was 34.7 years. 26.1% of residents were under the age of 18 and 14.1% of residents were 65 years of age or older. For every 100 females there were 88.0 males, and for every 100 females age 18 and over there were 81.8 males age 18 and over.

94.0% of residents lived in urban areas, while 6.0% lived in rural areas.

There were 15,840 households in Phenix City, including 9,170 family households; 34.1% had children under the age of 18 living in them. Of all households, 34.6% were married-couple households, 20.2% were households with a male householder and no spouse or partner present, and 39.2% were households with a female householder and no spouse or partner present. About 32.3% of all households were made up of individuals and 11.2% had someone living alone who was 65 years of age or older.

There were 17,498 housing units, of which 9.5% were vacant. The homeowner vacancy rate was 1.7% and the rental vacancy rate was 6.1%.

Racial composition as of the 2020 census
Race	Number	Percent
White	16,164	41.6%
Black or African American	19,043	49.1%
American Indian and Alaska Native	143	0.4%
Asian	371	1.0%
Native Hawaiian and Other Pacific Islander	71	0.2%
Some other race	845	2.2%
Two or more races	2,179	5.6%
Hispanic or Latino (of any race)	2,311	6.0%

=== 2010 census ===
As of the census of 2010, there were 32,822 people, 13,243 households, and 8,623 families residing in the city. The population density was 1,334.2 inhabitants per square mile (515.1/km^{2}). There were 15,198 housing units at an average density of 617.8 per square mile (238.5/km^{2}). The racial makeup of the city was 48.7% white, 46.6% black or African American, 0.3% Native American, 0.7% Asian, 0.2% Pacific Islander, 1.4% from other races, and 2.2% from two or more races. 4.0% of the population were Hispanic or Latino of any race.

There were 13,243 households, out of which 31.8% had children under the age of 18 living with them, 36.4% were married couples living together, 23.9% had a female householder with no husband present, and 34.9% were non-families. 30.1% of all households were made up of individuals, and 9.5% had someone living alone who was 65 years of age or older. The average household size was 2.44 and the average family size was 3.03.

In the city, the population was spread out, with 26.9% under the age of 18, 10.4% from 18 to 24, 27.9% from 25 to 44, 23.0% from 45 to 64, and 11.8% who were 65 years of age or older. The median age was 33.1 years. For every 100 females, there were 87.7 males. For every 100 females age 18 and over, there were 86.0 males.

The median income for a household in the city was $33,120, and the median income for a family was $39,417. Males had a median income of $36,827 versus $27,001 for females. The per capita income for the city was $18,883. About 20.3% of families and 23.9% of the population were below the poverty line, including 39.7% of those under age 18 and 13.1% of those age 65 or over.

=== 2000 census ===
As of the census of 2000, there were 28,265 people, 11,517 households, and 7,566 families residing in the city. The population density was 1,149.1 inhabitants per square mile (443.7/km^{2}). There were 13,250 housing units at an average density of 538.7 per square mile (208.0/km^{2}). The racial makeup of the city was 52.94% white, 44.97% black or African American, 0.23% Native American, 0.53% Asian, 0.02% Pacific Islander, .56% from other races, and .76% from two or more races. 1.49% of the population were Hispanic or Latino of any race.

There were 11,517 households, out of which 31.7% had children under the age of 18 living with them, 39.4% were married couples living together, 22.1% had a female householder with no husband present, and 34.3% were non-families. 30.4% of all households were made up of individuals, and 11.5% had someone living alone who was 65 years of age or older. The average household size was 2.40 and the average family size was 2.99.

In the city, the population was spread out, with 26.3% under the age of 18, 9.6% from 18 to 24, 28.7% from 25 to 44, 21.2% from 45 to 64, and 14.2% who were 65 years of age or older. The median age was 35 years. For every 100 females, there were 86.2 males. For every 100 females age 18 and over, there were 80.4 males.

The median income for a household in the city was $26,720, and the median income for a family was $33,740. Males had a median income of $28,906 versus $21,348 for females. The per capita income for the city was $14,619. About 18.8% of families and 21.3% of the population were below the poverty line, including 29.5% of those under age 18 and 20.6% of those age 65 or over.

== Time zone ==
Unlike the rest of Alabama which lies in the Central Time Zone, Phenix City's proximity to the larger city of neighboring Columbus, Georgia, located in the Eastern Time Zone, and its strong economic links leads Phenix City (including its municipal government) and localities within a 10–15 mi (16–24 km) radius (such as Smiths Station) to observe Eastern Time on a de facto basis.

== Media ==
There are three radio stations licensed in Phenix City: WHTY (1460 AM), WURY-LP (97.1 FM), & WGSY (100.1 FM).

== Transportation ==
Phenix City Express provides local bus service on two routes in the city connecting with METRA Transit System in Columbus.

== Education ==
Public education is provided by Phenix City Public Schools.

== Sister cities ==
- Colomiers, France
- Kamenice, Czech Republic
- Västerås, Sweden

== Notable people ==
- Jo Jo Benson, R&B singer
- Hugh A. Bentley, helped reform Phenix City in the 1950s
- Bob the Drag Queen, drag queen
- Simeon Castille, former NFL cornerback
- Wally Chambers, former NFL defensive tackle
- Rodney Cooper, basketball player
- Harvey Glance, track-and-field star in 1976 Summer Olympics and 1979 Pan-Am Games
- Aidan Gould, child actor
- Nolan Gould, child actor
- Bishop Harris, former head coach of North Carolina Central University football team
- Freddie Hart, country singer who wrote and recorded "Phenix City"
- Tim Hudson, MLB pitcher
- Billy Jackson, former NFL running back
- Van Jakes, former NFL cornerback
- James Joseph, former NFL running back
- Kasey Kiker, MLB player
- Boise Kimber, American Baptist minister and civil rights activist
- Ed King, former NFL offensive guard
- Herm Lee, former NFL offensive tackle
- Eddie Lowe, former Canadian Football League linebacker and current mayor of Phenix City
- Woodrow Lowe, former NFL player, College Football Hall of Fame member
- Triandos Luke, former NFL wide receiver
- Joe Meriweather, former NBA player
- John Malcolm Patterson, Governor of Alabama from 1959 to 1963
- Colby Rasmus, MLB outfielder
- David Ray, former NFL placekicker
- Tommie Robinson, football coach
- Jimmie Spheeris, singer-songwriter
- Rob Spivery, former basketball player and current head basketball coach at Southern University
- Bruce Stephens, former NFL wide receiver
- Rufus Stokes, inventor
- Ucambre Williams, football player and coach

== Gallery ==
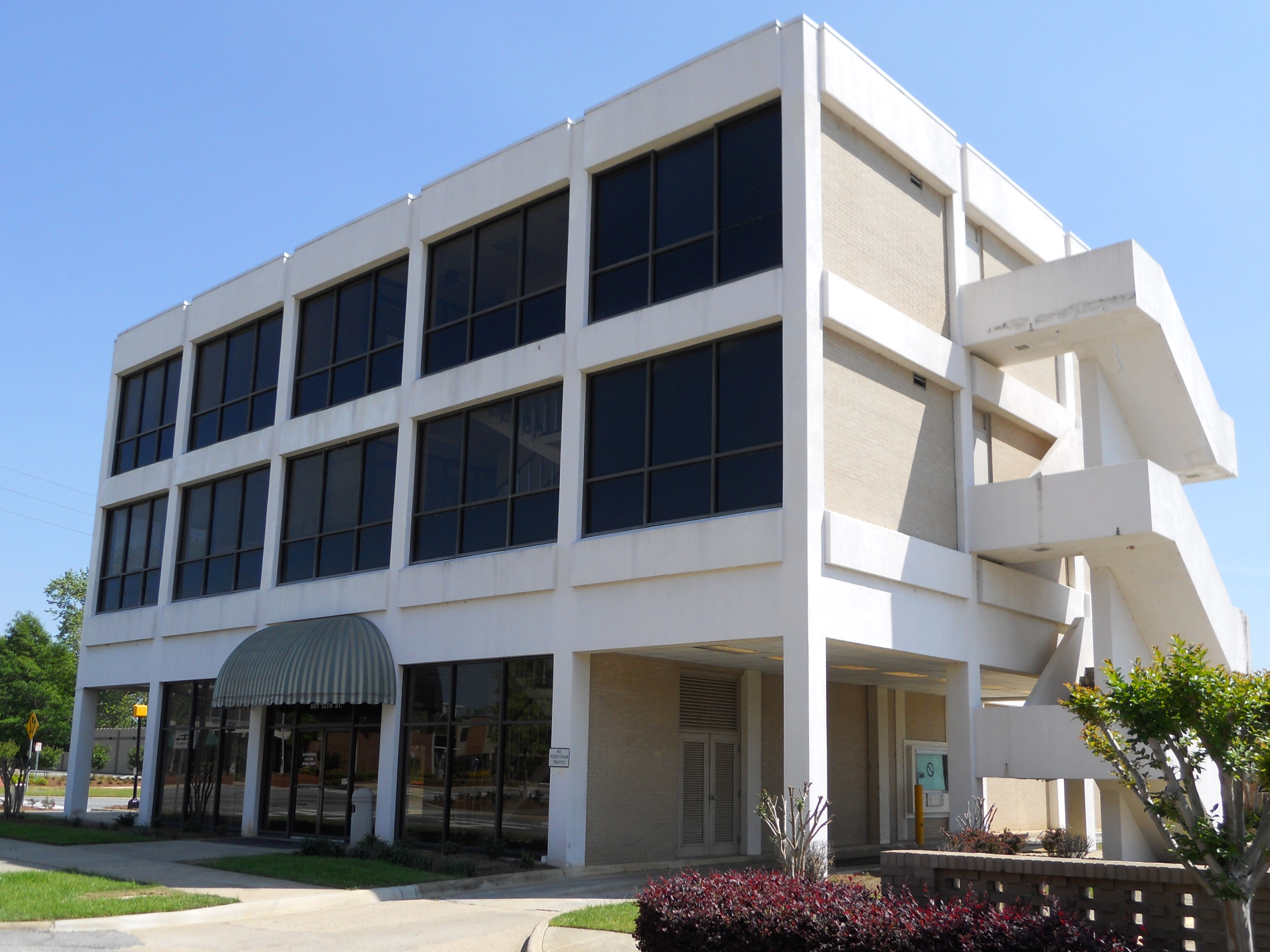
Phenix City Municipal building

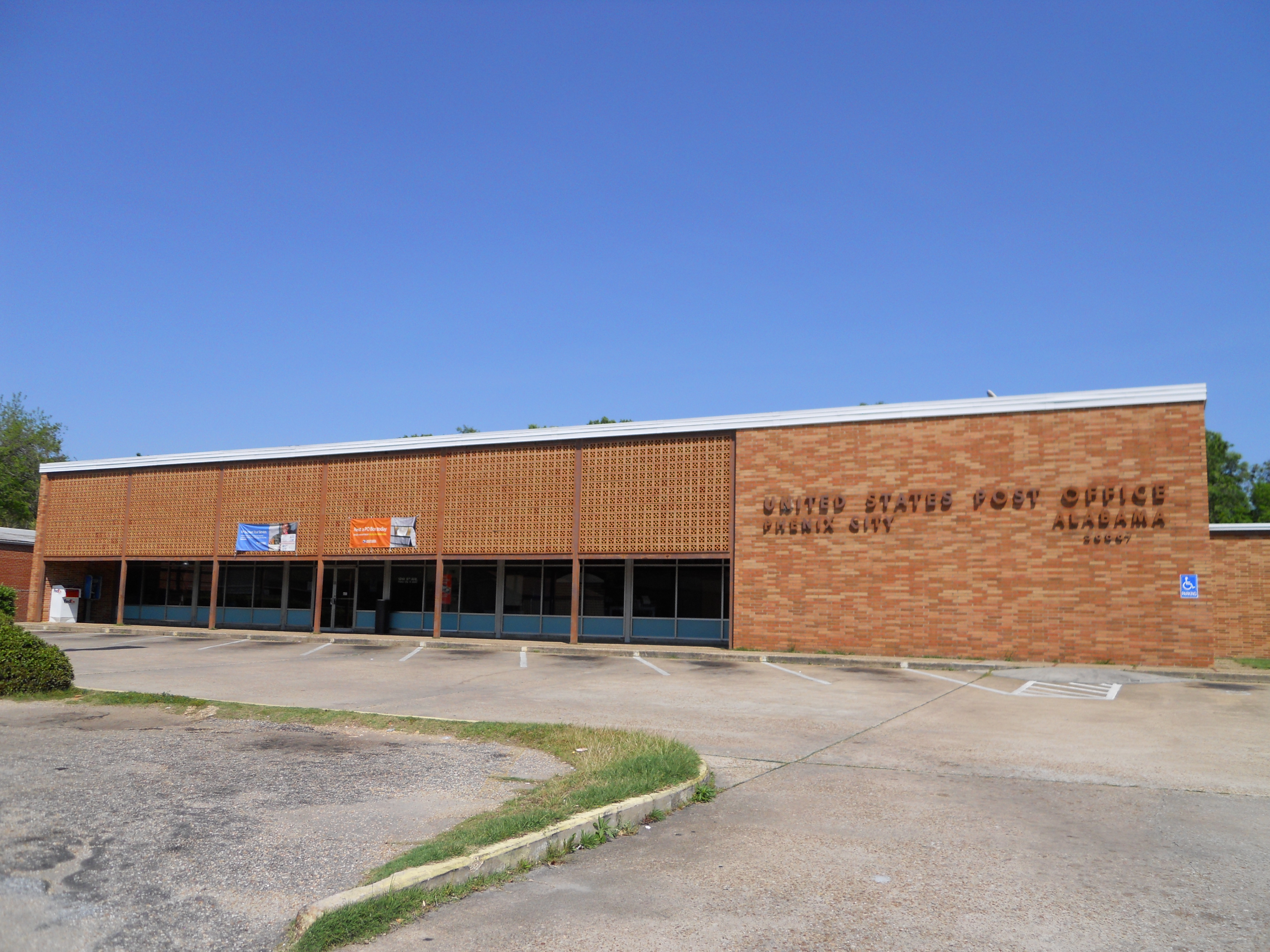
Phenix City Post Office (ZIP Code: 36867)

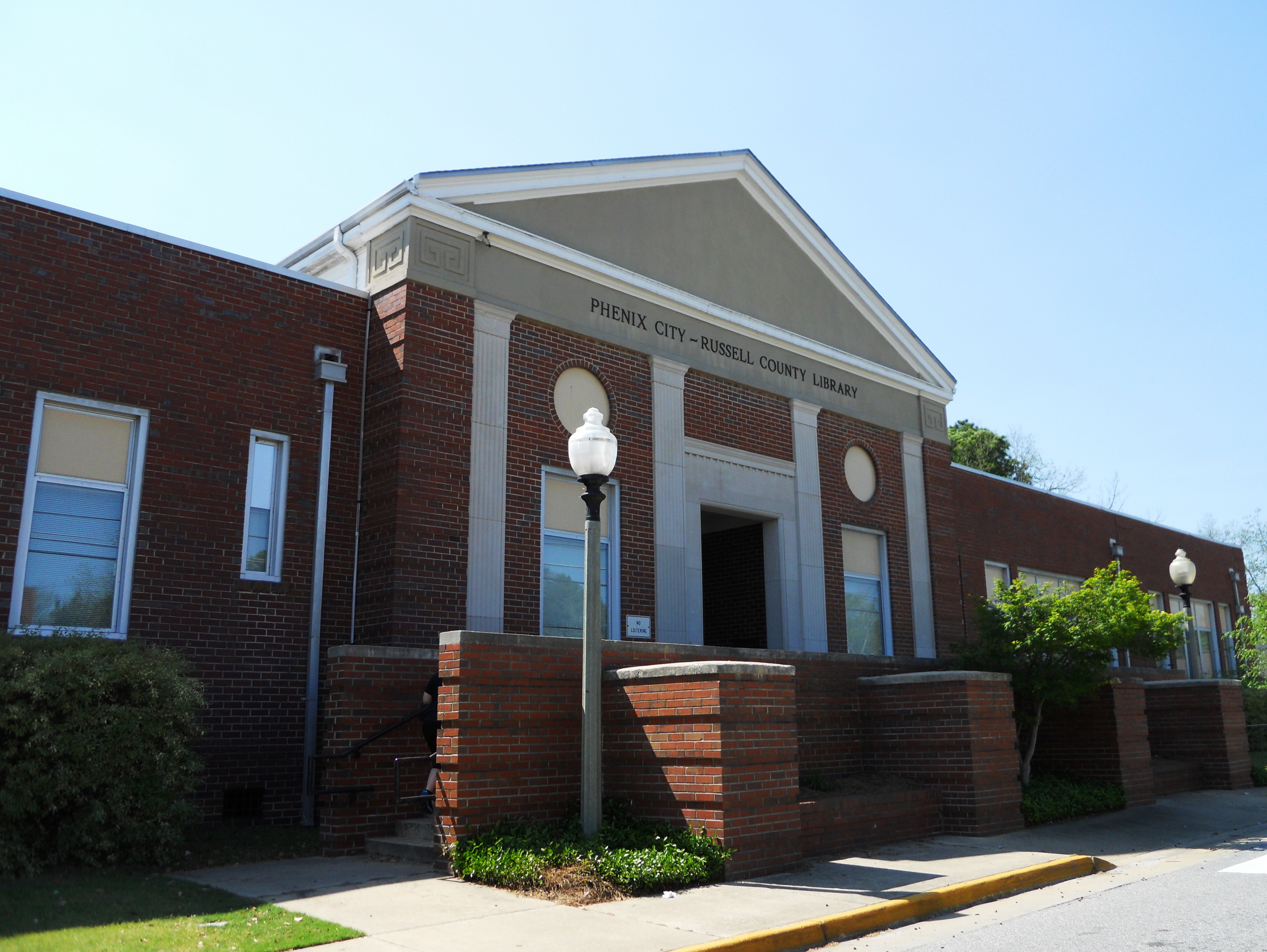
Phenix City/Russell County Library

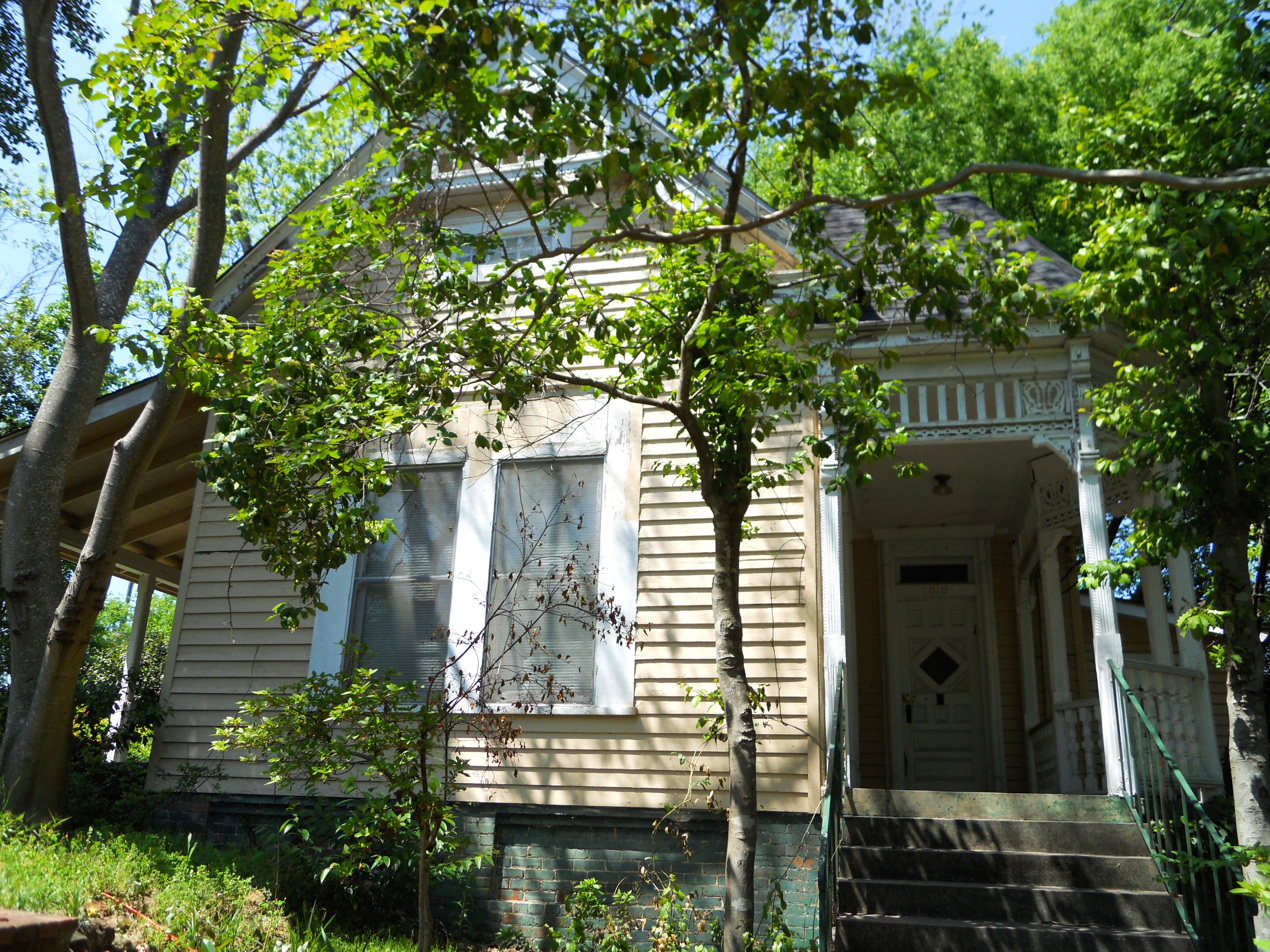
The Brooks–Hughes House was added to the National Register of Historic Places on November 3, 1983.

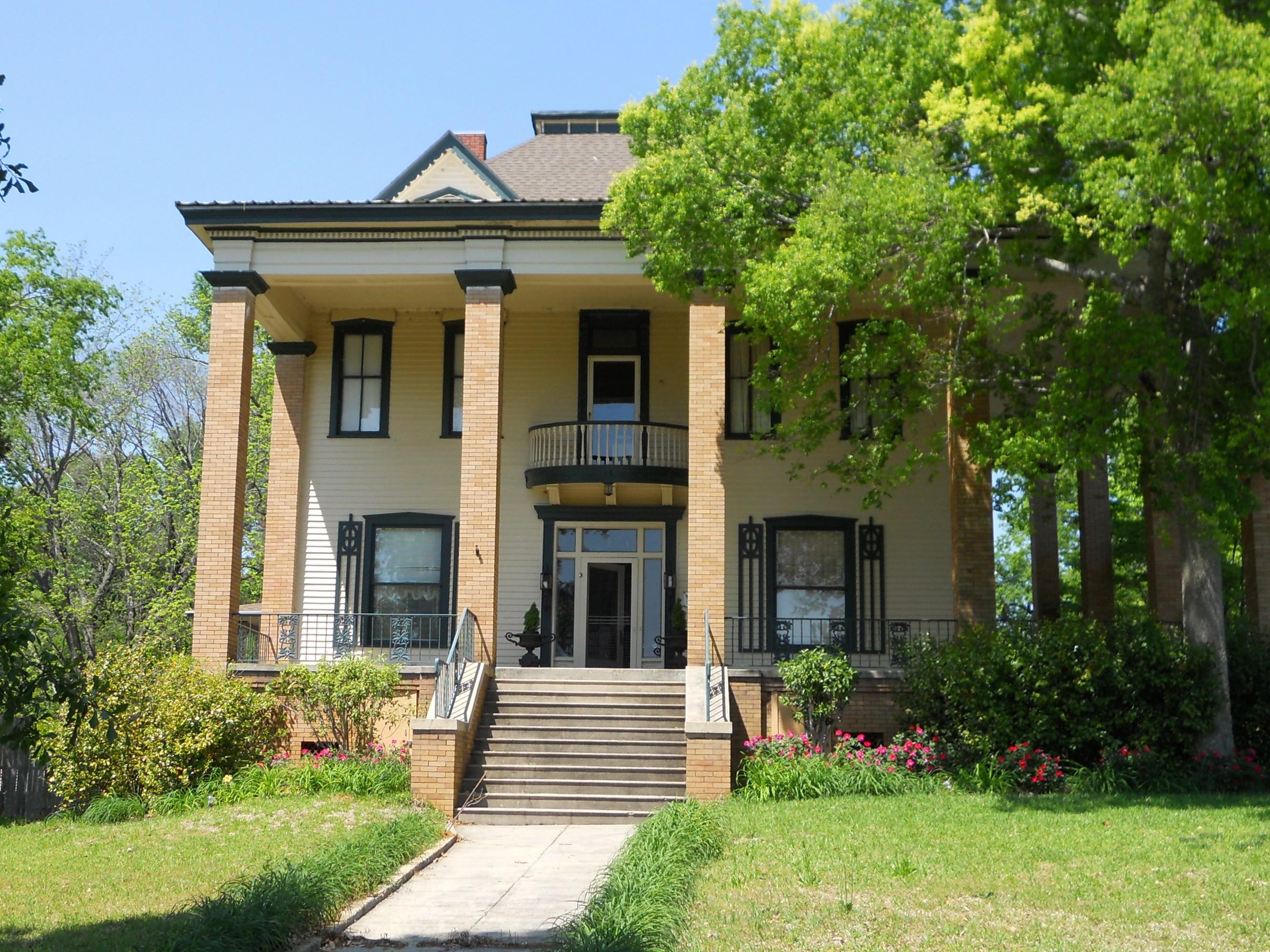
The Floyd-Newsome House was added to the National Register of Historic Places on November 3, 1983.

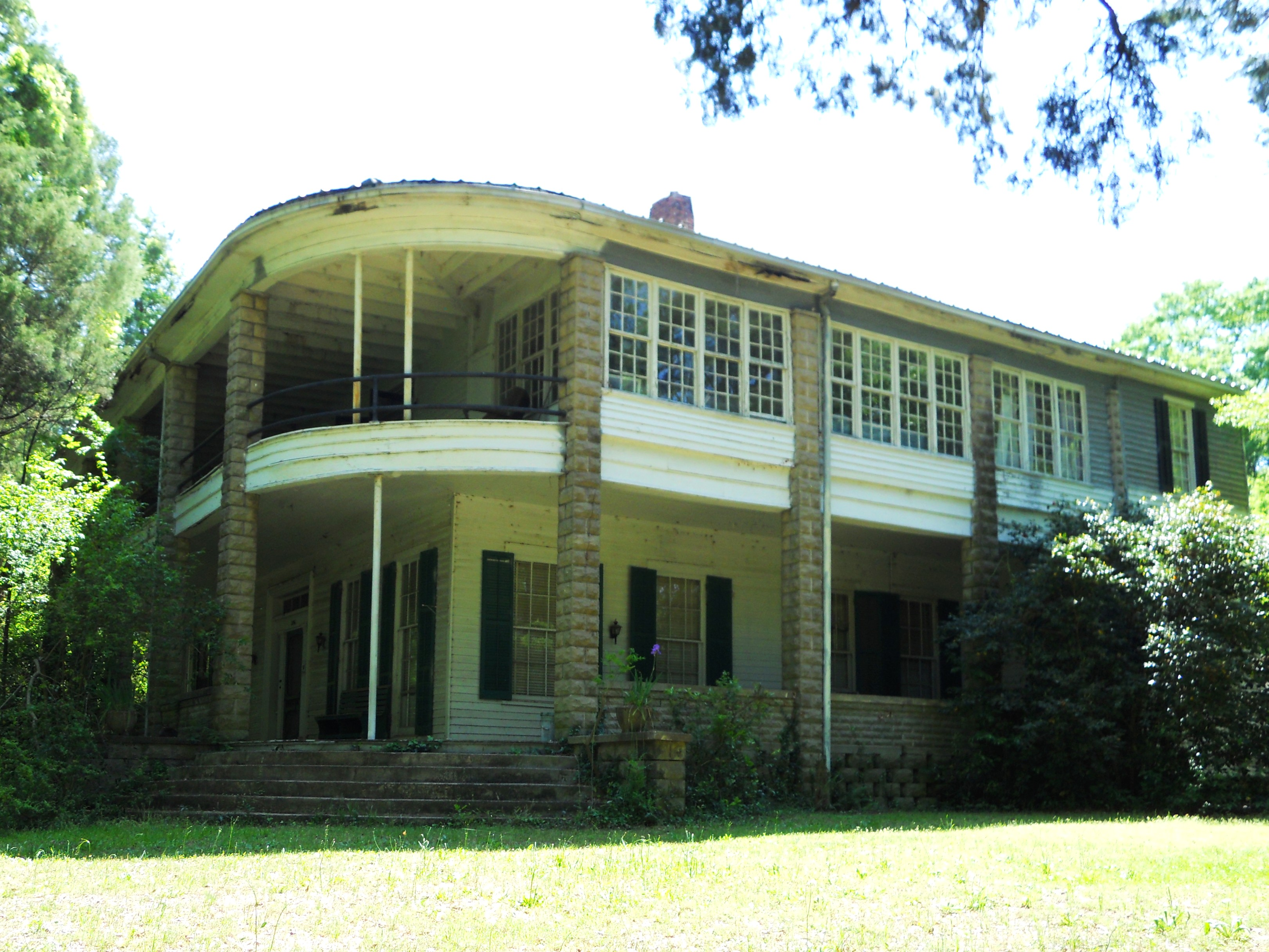
The Morgan-Curtis House was added to the National Register of Historic Places on November 3, 1983.

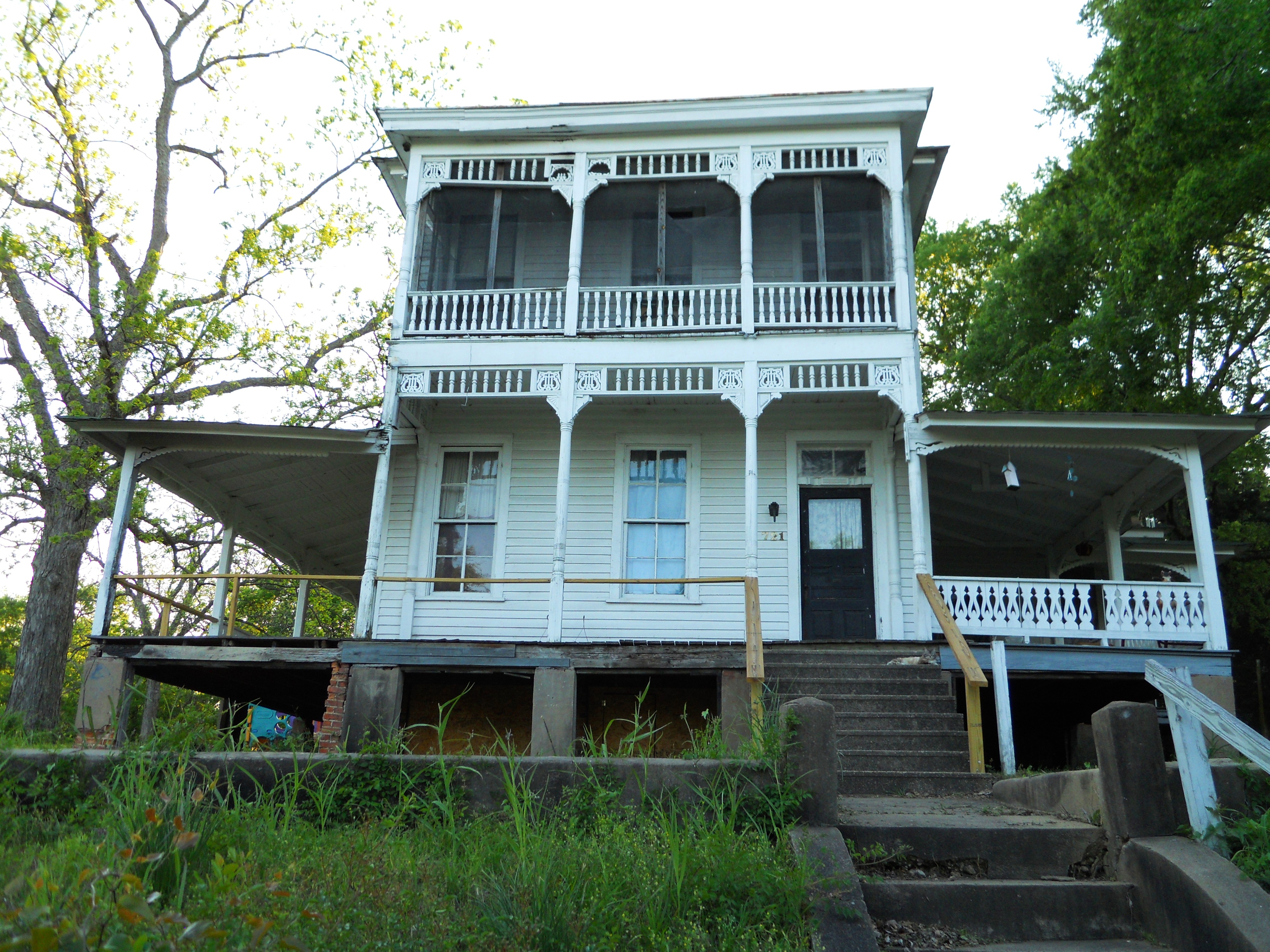
The Shapre-Monte House was added to the National Register of Historic Places on November 3, 1983.
