= Hugh A. Bentley =

Hugh A. Bentley (1909–1984) is known for launching a cleanup drive to get rid of crime and corruption in Phenix City, Alabama, in the early 1950s. He was beaten, and survived an assassination attempt with a dynamite bomb.

== Personal life ==
Bentley was born on August 15, 1909, in Phenix City. He was the youngest of seven sons. His father, Calvin Bentley, operated a grocery store. His mother was Minnie Bentley. Bentley attended the high school in Phenix City, then Massey Business School in Columbus, Georgia, and Northwestern University in Evanston, Illinois. He married Bernice Roche, and the couple had three children. Bentley opened a sporting goods store in Columbus, Georgia.

== Reform ==
In 1949, Bentley decided to reform Phenix City, which was widely known as a "sin city," a center of prostitution, and gambling, run by corrupt officials. Phenix City was located across the river from Fort Benning, and its vice dens were a lure for servicemen. After efforts to create civic betterment associations, such as the Christian Laymen's Association and the Good Government League, he organized the Ministers Alliance, which turned over to the Russell County Grand Jury evidence of organized crime in Phenix City. He founded the Russell Betterment Association (named after the county in which Phenix City is located), in 1950. The RBA then enlisted the help of Albert Patterson, an attorney, to help fight corruption at the state level, by running for state Attorney General.

== Violent altercations ==
His house was dynamited in January 1952 while he was away. No one in the family was seriously injured, although his son Hughbo was hurled from his bedroom by the explosion. On Election Day in May 1952, while monitoring the polling places Bentley, his son Hughbo, and their fellow activist Hugh Britton were beaten bloody by thugs.

== Murder of Albert Patterson ==
In 1954, Albert Patterson, supported by Bentley and the RBA, successfully ran for the Democratic nomination for state Attorney General. On June 18, 1954, Patterson was killed by four gunshots. The assassination prompted Gov. Gordon Persons to declare martial law in Phenix City, and to send in the National Guard to enforce martial law. Those indicted for the murder of Patterson included the Attorney General of Alabama, who was judged mentally unfit to stand trial, the Russell County District Attorney, who was acquitted, and a Deputy Sheriff, who was convicted. Over a six-month period the National Guard cleaned up the town, destroying gambling operations and brothels and enforcing a ban on alcohol sales. A grand jury produced 600 indictments against town officials By 1955 conditions had improved enough that Look Magazine called Phenix City an "All American City."

== Motion picture ==
In 1955 the motion picture The Phenix City Story included a portrayal of Bentley by the actor Otto Hulett. In 1958, Bentley's life story, in particular his efforts in the Russell Betterment Association, was presented on the TV program This Is Your Life. After the cleanup of Phenix City, Bentley continued to support community improvement, as well as serving as a Sunday School teacher. He died on April 13, 1984, in Phenix City.
