= Thunderhoof =

Thunderhoof may refer to:

- Thunderhoof (film), 1948 American film
- Thunderhoof, character from Transformers: Robots in Disguise
