= The Phenix City Story =

1955 film by Phil Karlson

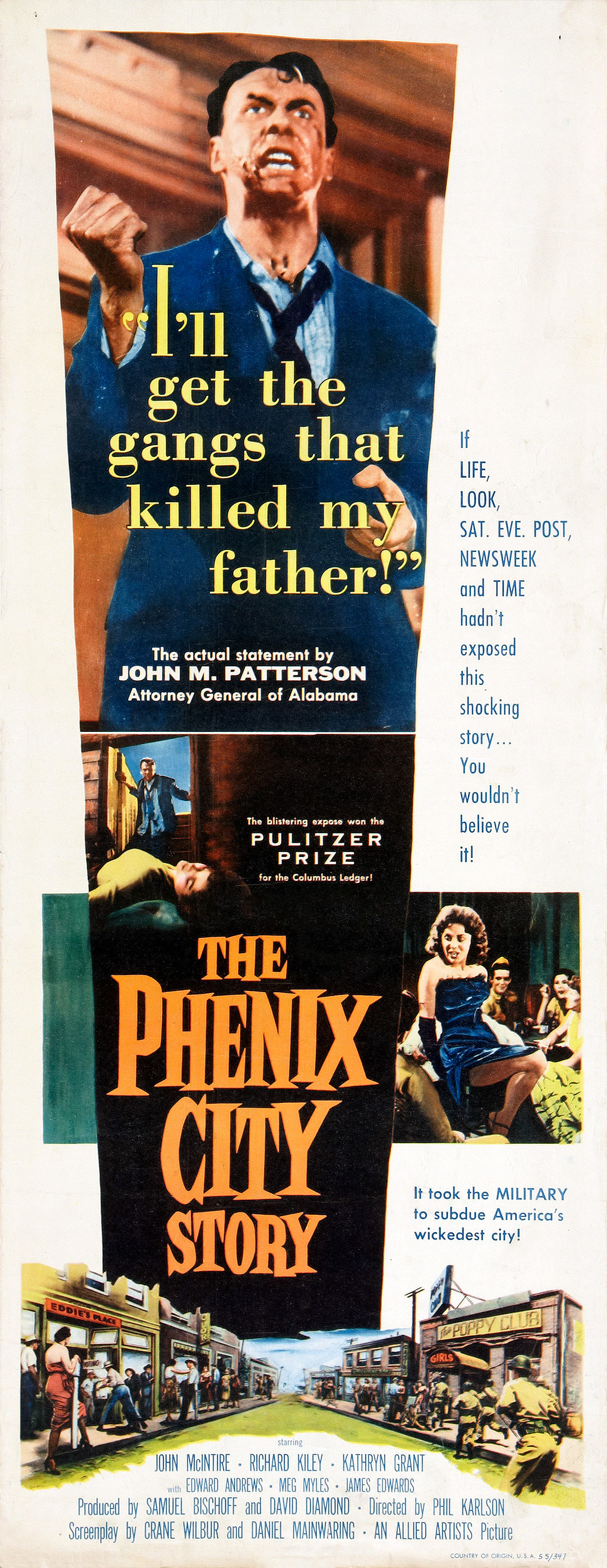
- Theatrical release poster
- Directed by: Phil Karlson
- Screenplay by: Daniel Mainwaring; Crane Wilbur
- Produced by: Samuel Bischoff; David Diamond
- Starring: John McIntire; Richard Kiley; Kathryn Grant; Edward Andrews; Meg Myles; James Edwards
- Cinematography: Harry Neumann
- Edited by: George White
- Music by: Harry Sukman
- Production company: Allied Artists Pictures
- Distributed by: Allied Artists Pictures
- Release dates: July 19, 1955 (Phenix City, Columbus, Chicago); August 14, 1955 (US)
- Running time: 100 minutes
- Country: United States
- Language: English
- Budget: $350,000
- Box office: $2.2 million (US)

The Phenix City Story is a 1955 American crime film noir directed by Phil Karlson for Allied Artists, written by Daniel Mainwaring and Crane Wilbur and starring John McIntire, Richard Kiley, and Kathryn Grant. It dramatizes the 1954 assassination of attorney and politician Albert Patterson in Phenix City, Alabama, and the subsequent declaration of martial law. Although the film presents Albert Patterson's son, John Patterson, as a reform figure opposing corruption, his later political career complicates this image; as governor of Alabama (1959–1963), Patterson was a staunch supporter of segregation and ran on a campaign heavily supported by the Ku Klux Klan. During his tenure as governor, John Patterson fought against desegregation, particularly in schools, and clashed with the John F. Kennedy administration over the handling of Freedom Riders.

The film had a triple premiere held on July 19, 1955 in Phenix City, Alabama, Columbus, Georgia, and Chicago, Illinois. It was a critical and commercial success, and has come to be regarded as one of the classics of the film noir genre. In 2019, the film was selected by the Library of Congress for preservation in the National Film Registry for being "culturally, historically, or aesthetically significant".

== Plot ==
The film opens in the Poppy Club, a nightclub in Phenix City, a corrupt Alabama town near the Army's Fort Benning, where singer Meg Myles performs “Phenix City Blues” as soldiers drink and gamble. The club, managed by mob moll Cassie and controlled by crime boss Rhett Tanner, serves as a center of the city’s illicit economy. Local law can do little to stop the criminal activities of Rhett Tanner, particularly in the wide-open "red-light district" area known for prostitution, taverns, and crooked gambling. Most of the police do not even try, since they are on Tanner's payroll. Inside the Poppy Club, Fred Gage, whose father is involved in local reform efforts, warns croupier Ellie Rhodes that the club’s operations may not last. In need of money, she dismisses the idea, stating that “nobody’s ever doing anything about [Phenix City], there’s too much profit.” When a customer accuses the club of cheating, he is beaten and thrown into the street while police fail to intervene.

Rhett Tanner presents himself publicly as a respectable, even charming, figure while privately threatening reformers. Local attorney Albert "Pat" Patterson, initially neutral and complacent, is urged to run for State Attorney General and clean up Phenix City, but he wants no part of a thankless, impossible job. He is content to welcome home his son John from military service. Upon his arrival home (along with his family) from serving in the Korean War, John Patterson becomes involved in efforts to challenge Phenix City's corruption, despite his father Albert’s reluctance. Members of the Russell County Betterment Association (RBA) are subjected to intimidation and violence by Tanner's cronies, such as the Poppy Club's bouncer Clem Wilson, often with police complicity. The conflict escalates when Clem Wilson abducts and murders the young daughter of club janitor Zeke Ward, whom John Patterson befriends, leaving her body on the Patterson family lawn as a warning. Soon after, Fred Gage is murdered by Clem Wilson, but Wilson is swiftly acquitted.

Overwhelmed by the series of violent tragedies at the hands of Tanner and his close associates, Albert Patterson finally decides to run for Attorney General. During the campaign, voter intimidation and electoral interference are rampant. Although Patterson wins the Democratic nomination, he is shot to death that same night outside his office, an act witnessed by Ellie Rhodes. John Patterson later discovers that Ellie has also been murdered and violently confronts Tanner and his thugs at Zeke Ward’s home. Although he nearly kills Tanner, John ultimately refrains from doing so after Zeke urges him to abandon vigilantism.

The film concludes with John Patterson calling for state intervention. The Alabama National Guard arrives in Phenix City and dismantles the city’s vice operations, destroying gambling equipment and seemingly restoring order.

== Themes ==
Through its depiction of systemic corruption, moral ambiguity—particularly the indifference of local authorities—and pervasive violence, The Phenix City Story has been interpreted as aligning with the conventions of film noir while adapting them to a Southern setting. Rather than the upscale nightclubs typically associated with urban noir in booming metropolises such as Los Angeles or New York, the film depicts a landscape of segregated juke joints and honky-tonks, where the clientele consists largely of soldiers rather than businessmen or elites. Consistent with film noir of the late 1940s and early 1950s, the film has also been read as reflecting broader postwar American disillusionment through its portrayal of compromised institutions and the erosion of public trust. For example, when RBA reformers Ed Gage (Truman Smith) and Hugh Britton (George Mitchell) visit the Patterson home in a failed attempt to persuade Albert to attend a meeting, Mary Jo, wife to John Patterson, notices Gage pull out a gun while grabbing for his pipe, emphasizing a looming sense of paranoia adopted by the town's residents, as well as a constant threat of danger for those who speak out against the city’s cronyism. Moreover, violence in the film is presented not as distant or exceptional, but as embedded within everyday life, occurring in what the film characterizes as “our Alabama, our America.”

== Cast ==
- John McIntire as Albert Patterson
- Richard Kiley as John Patterson
- Kathryn Grant as Ellie Rhodes
- Edward Andrews as Rhett Tanner
- James Edwards as Zeke Ward
- Lenka Peterson as Mary Jo Patterson
- Biff McGuire as Fred Gage
- Truman Smith as Ed Gage
- Jean Carson as Cassie
- Kathy Marlowe as Mamie
- John Larch as Clem Wilson
- Allen Nourse as Jeb Bassett
- Helen Martin as Helen Ward
- Otto Hulett as Hugh A. Bentley
- George Mitchell as Hugh Britton
- Ma Beachie as herself
- Meg Myles as the Poppy Club singer

== Production ==
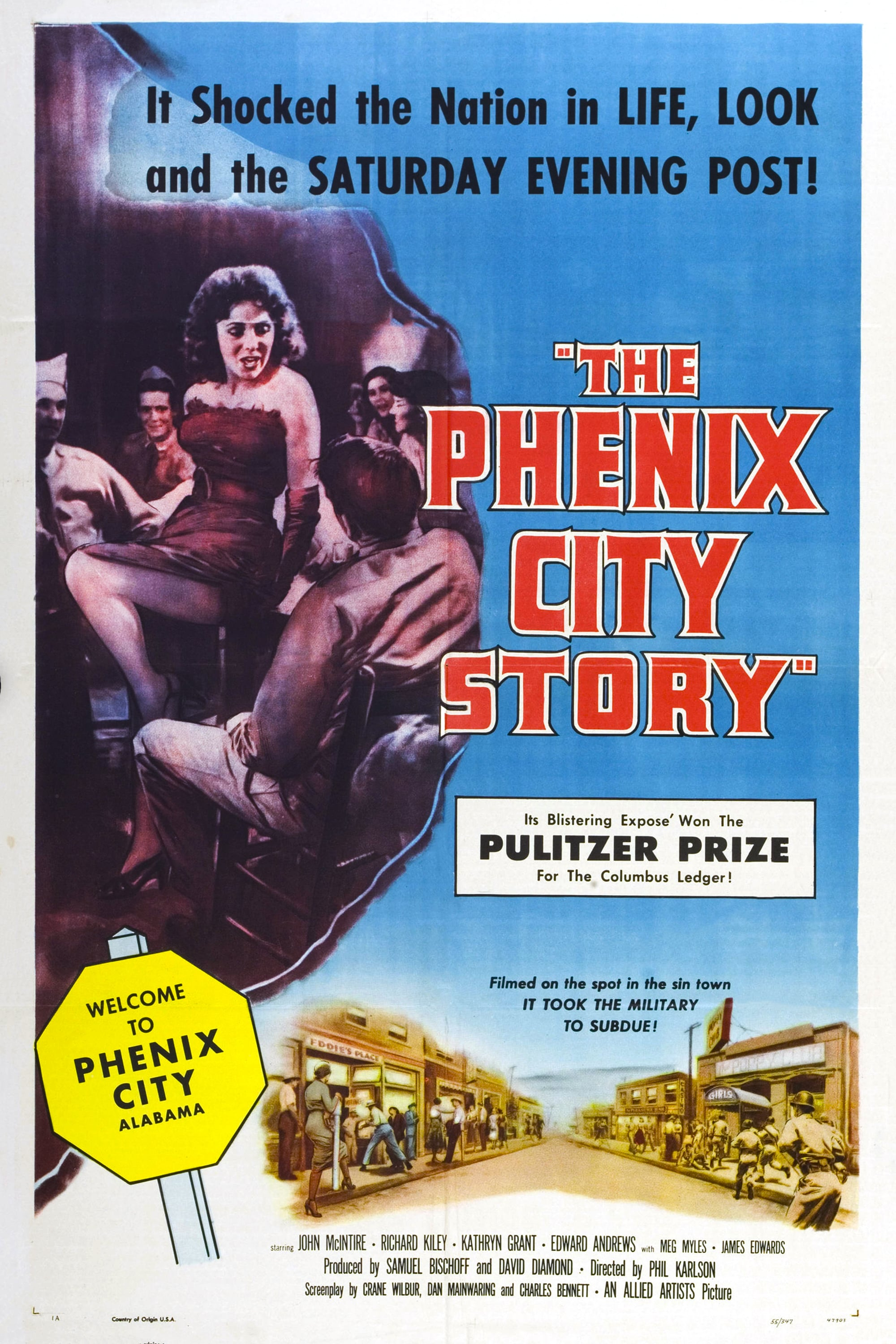
1955 poster

The film depicts the real-life 1954 assassination of Albert Patterson, who had just been nominated as the Democratic candidate for Alabama Attorney General on a platform of cleaning up Phenix City, a city controlled by organized crime. Patterson was murdered in Phenix City, and the subsequent outcry resulted in the imposition of martial law by the state government. Some prints of the film include a 13-minute newsreel-style preface including newsman Clete Roberts interviewing many of the actual participants.

== Reception ==
When the film was released in 1955, Bosley Crowther, film critic for The New York Times, gave it a positive review, writing, "In a style of dramatic documentation that is as sharp and sure as was that of On the Waterfront--or, for a more appropriate comparison, that of the memorable All the King's Men--scriptwriters Crane Wilbur and Dan Mainwaring and director Phil Karlson expose the raw tissue of corruption and terrorism in an American city that is steeped in vice. They catch in slashing, searching glimpses the shrewd chicanery of evil men, the callousness and baseness of their puppets and the dread and silence of local citizens. And, through a series of excellent performances, topped by that of John McIntyre as the eventually martyred crusader, they show the sinew and the bone of those who strive for decent things."

Film critic Bruce Eder wrote, "One of the most violent and realistic crime films of the 1950s, The Phenix City Story pulses with the bracing energy of actual life captured on the screen in its establishing shots and key scenes, and punctuates that background with explosively filmed action scenes. Director Phil Karlson showed just how good he was at merging well-told screen drama with vivid verisimilitude and leaving no seams to show where they joined. Filmed on location in Alabama with a documentary-like look, the movie captured the ambience and tenor of its Deep South setting better than almost any other fact-based movie of its era."

== Legacy ==
In 2019, the film was selected by the Library of Congress for preservation in the National Film Registry for being "culturally, historically, or aesthetically significant".

=== In other media ===
It was also featured in the 1995 documentary film A Personal Journey with Martin Scorsese Through American Movies.

== Home media ==
Warner Bros. released the film on DVD on July 13, 2010, in its Film Noir Classic Collection, Vol. 5.

== See also ==
- List of American films of 1955
- Culture of Alabama
- Culture of Georgia
- Walking Tall
