= Phil Karlson =

American film director (1908–1982)

- Born: Philip N. Karlstein; July 2, 1908; Chicago, Illinois, U.S.
- Died: December 12, 1982 (aged 74); Los Angeles, California, U.S.
- Education: School of the Art Institute of Chicago; Loyola Marymount University
- Occupation: Film director

Philip N. Karlstein (July 2, 1908 – December 12, 1982), known professionally as Phil Karlson, was an American film director, noted for his gritty crime films and films noir. His notable works included Kansas City Confidential (1952), Scandal Sheet (also 1952), 99 River Street (1953), Hell's Island (1955), The Phenix City Story (also 1955), Tight Spot (also 1955), and 5 Against the House (also 1955).

Karlson's other films including Gunman's Walk (1958), Hell to Eternity (1960), The Young Doctors (1961), the Elvis Presley vehicle Kid Galahad (1962), the Dean Martin spy comedy The Silencers (1966), the horror film Ben (1972), and the original Walking Tall (1973).

== Biography ==
=== Early life ===
Karlson was the son of Irish actress Lillian O'Brien. His father was Jewish.

He attended Marshall High School and studied painting at Chicago's Art Institute. He tried to make a living as a song and dance man but was unsuccessful. Then he studied law, at his father's request, at Loyola Marymount University in California. He took a part-time job at Universal Pictures "washing toilets and dishes and whatever the hell they gave me" according to Karlson. He also sold some gags to Buster Keaton. Eventually he decided to pursue a career in film, quitting college a year before graduation.

=== Assistant Director at Universal ===
Karlson got a job at Universal Pictures, doing a variety of jobs.

He worked as assistant director on Destry Rides Again (1932) and My Pal, the King with Tom Mix; The Countess of Monte Cristo (1934) and Cheating Cheaters (1934) with Fay Wray; I Like It That Way (1934); Romance in the Rain (1934); and Strange Wives (1934), directed by Richard Thorpe.

He worked on The Mystery of Edwin Drood (1935) with Claude Rains; Princess O'Hara (1935); Alias Mary Dow (1935), for Kurt Neumann; Werewolf of London (1935); Sing Me a Love Song (1935); She Gets Her Man (1935); The Affair of Susan (1935); Love Before Breakfast (1936), with director Walter Lang; The Girl on the Front Page (1936); and Top of the Town (1937).

Karlson said that Sam Goldwyn put him under contract intending to use him as a director, but Karlson wound up spending nine months idle. He asked for a release of his contract and got it. He joined a company of Maurice Kosloff.

He went back to Universal where he worked as an assistant on The Black Doll (1938); The Case of the Missing Blonde (1938); The Last Express (1938); His Exciting Night (1938), The Last Warning (1938), Newsboys' Home (1938), and Society Smugglers (1939), directed by Joe May.

His credits became more distinguished: Rio (1939), with Basil Rathbone, directed by John Brahm; The Invisible Man Returns (1940) and The House of the Seven Gables for May; I Can't Give You Anything But Love, Baby (1940), a musical; You're Not So Tough (1940), for May; Margie (1940), Seven Sinners (1940), with John Wayne and Marlene Dietrich for director Tay Garnett; Where Did You Get That Girl? (1941), for Arthur Lubin; and The Flame of New Orleans (1941), with Dietrich for René Clair.

Karlson did In the Navy (1941) with Abbott and Costello for Lubin, and he became friendly with Lou Costello, often pitching him gags. He worked on It Started with Eve (1941) for Henry Koster with the studio's other big star, Deanna Durbin.

Karlson quit Universal in 1940 to enlist in the U.S. Army Air Forces. In 1943, he was injured in a plane crash ending his career as a flight instructor.

=== Monogram Pictures ===
Karlson, still using his real name of Philip Karlstein, took a job at Monogram Pictures, as an assistant director. He was contacted by Lou Costello, who wanted to produce a film and offered Karlstein the job of directing it. The resulting movie was A Wave, a WAC and a Marine (1944), starring comedian Henny Youngman. Karlson called it "probably the worst picture ever made... a nothing picture, but I was lucky because it was for Monogram and they didn't understand how bad it was, because they had never made anything that was any good." However, Karlson did like his second film as director, G. I. Honeymoon (1945), with Gale Storm, which received an Oscar nomination for Best Music.

Karlson made Monogram's low-budget productions look much more expensive by being creative with the staging. He used light and shadow to add mood to ordinary dialogue scenes, and employed careful camera angles to maximize the size of the limited sets. Karlson's resourcefulness made him Monogram's choice to launch a new series (The Bowery Boys, The Shadow) or invigorate an existing one (Charlie Chan). An excellent example is Karlson's Charlie Chan mystery The Shanghai Cobra (1945) in which the director, given a small exterior set, established a film noir atmosphere by shooting the scene at night during a rainstorm. Karlson was well aware of Monogram's budgetary limitations: "They knew what they were doing, because there was a certain class of picture they were going to make and they weren't going to make anything any different."

Slightly more distinguished was Wife Wanted (1946) which starred and was produced by Kay Francis. Both she and Karlson disliked the original script so they rewrote it together. It turned out to be Francis's last movie. He followed it with Kilroy Was Here (1947), co-starring former child actors Jackie Cooper and Jackie Coogan.

Karlson received acclaim for Black Gold (1947), a story of the plight of the American Indian, based around the true story of the racehorse Black Gold. It was an early lead for Anthony Quinn and the first film released by Monogram's new, higher-budget division, Allied Artists. Karlson took a year to make that film because he wanted seasonal shots; he says he directed four films while also making Black Gold.

Karlson then made Louisiana (1947) with governor Jimmie Davis. He followed this with Rocky (1948) with Roddy McDowall.

=== Columbia ===
Karlson went over to Columbia Pictures where he directed two Westerns, Above All Laws (1947) and Fury (1948). He then made Ladies of the Chorus (1948), with Marilyn Monroe in her first substantial role.

British production company Eagle-Lion Films hired Karlson to direct The Big Cat (1949), which he later described as his answer to The Grapes of Wrath (1940). While at Eagle-Lion Karlson also did Down Memory Lane (1949) with Steve Allen, shot in two days.

=== Edward Small ===
Karlson teamed with producer Edward Small for The Iroquois Trail (1950) with George Montgomery, based on The Last of the Mohicans. Small liked Karlson's work and used him on Lorna Doone (1951), an adaptation of the famous novel with Richard Greene, and The Texas Rangers (1951), a Western with Montgomery.

These films were distributed by Columbia, who used Karlson for Mask of the Avenger (1951), a swashbuckler with John Derek. For Small he did Scandal Sheet (1952), a newspaper melodrama from a novel by Sam Fuller, and The Brigand (1952), another swashbuckler.

Karlson started directing Assignment: Paris (1952) for Columbia in Paris but was fired by studio head Harry Cohn during filming and replaced by Robert Parrish.

Karlson bounced back with two films for Edward Small starring John Payne that were released through United Artists: Kansas City Confidential (1952) and 99 River Street (1953).

Karlson did episodes of The Revlon Mirror Theater (1953) and did all episodes of the TV series Waterfront (1954).

Karlson was invited back to Columbia to do a Western They Rode West (1954) and a film noir Tight Spot (1955). He also directed episodes of Ford Television Theatre and Studio 57.

After making Hell's Island (1955) with John Payne for Paramount Pictures, he did 5 Against the House (1955), a heist movie at Columbia, which gave Kim Novak one of her first roles.

Karlson returned to Monogram (now known as Allied Artists) to make The Phenix City Story (1955), based on the murder of Albert Patterson. It was a hit and came to be regarded as one of his best movies. He went back to Columbia for The Brothers Rico (1957), a thriller, and Gunman's Walk (1958), a Western.

Desi Arnaz hired Karlson to direct the pilot for the TV series The Untouchables (1959), later released theatrically as The Scarface Mob. Although The Untouchables had a long run on TV, Karlson only received a straight salary for his work on the pilot.

=== 1960s ===
Karlson was Albert R. Broccoli and Harry Saltzman's first choice to direct their first James Bond film Dr. No (1962), but they were forced to decline him after he asked for too high of a salary.

For Allied Artists he did a war biopic Hell to Eternity (1960), followed by Key Witness (1960). Both starred Jeffrey Hunter.

Karlson directed The Secret Ways (1961) from a novel by Alistair MacLean, although he clashed with star-producer Richard Widmark. He made a melodrama, The Young Doctors (1961); an Elvis Presley film, Kid Galahad (1962); and Rampage (1963), an adventure story with Robert Mitchum. He directed the pilot for a TV series about Alexander the Great with William Shatner that was not picked up and did uncredited work on Ride the Wild Surf (1964).

Karlson enjoyed a big hit with the first Matt Helm movie with Dean Martin, The Silencers (1966). It was made by Columbia who asked Karlson to take over from Roger Corman on A Time for Killing (1967). He returned to the Matt Helm movies for the fourth and final one, The Wrecking Crew (1968), co-starring Sharon Tate and Elke Sommer.

=== 1970s ===
Karlson made a war movie in Europe with Rock Hudson, Hornets' Nest (1970). He did a horror movie, Ben (1972), best remembered for its Michael Jackson theme song.

He had a huge success in 1973 with Walking Tall, the fact-based story of a crusading sheriff Buford Pusser in the most corrupt county in Tennessee. It was a major domestic and international hit, costing $500,000 and grossing more than $23 million. It also made Karlson a fortune, thanks to the fact that he owned a large percentage of it.

His last film was Framed (1975) with Joe Don Baker.

== Career appraisal ==
Wheeler Winston Dixon later wrote of Karlson:

[He] emerges as a violent American original, born and brought up in Chicago, used to violence as a way of life, someone who was forced to make a great many films that he didn't believe in, just so that he could finally get a free hand with the minor studios to make the films that he did ... In Karlson's best films, a truly bleak vision of American society is readily apparent; a world where everything is for sale, where no one can be trusted, where all authority is corrupt, and honest men and women have no one to turn to but themselves if they want any measure of justice. For Karlson, everything comes with a price – in blood, death, and betrayal. ... In his finest work, Karlson seems to be saying "don't you believe what they tell you. Authority figures only look out for themselves. There are no easy answers. You won't get what you deserve, and you won't even get what you fight for. You'll get what you can take, and that's got to be enough."

The Academy Film Archive has preserved his films Tight Spot and Scandal Sheet.

In 2019, Karlson's film The Phenix City Story was selected by the Library of Congress for preservation in the National Film Registry for being "culturally, historically, or aesthetically significant".

== Partial filmography ==
- 1944: A Wave, a WAC and a Marine
- 1945: There Goes Kelly
- 1945: G.I. Honeymoon
- 1945: The Shanghai Cobra
- 1946: Live Wires
- 1946: Swing Parade of 1946
- 1946: Dark Alibi
- 1946: Bowery Bombshell
- 1946: Wife Wanted
- 1947: Louisiana
- 1947: Kilroy Was Here
- 1948: Thunderhoof
- 1948: Ladies of the Chorus
- 1949: The Big Cat
- 1950: The Iroquois Trail
- 1951: Lorna Doone
- 1951: The Texas Rangers
- 1951: Mask of the Avenger
- 1952: Scandal Sheet
- 1952: The Brigand
- 1952: Kansas City Confidential
- 1953: 99 River Street
- 1954: They Rode West
- 1955: Tight Spot
- 1955: Hell's Island
- 1955: 5 Against the House
- 1955: The Phenix City Story
- 1957: The Brothers Rico
- 1958: Gunman's Walk
- 1960: Hell to Eternity
- 1961: The Secret Ways
- 1961: The Young Doctors
- 1962: Kid Galahad
- 1963: Rampage
- 1966: The Silencers
- 1967: A Time for Killing
- 1969: The Wrecking Crew
- 1970: Hornets' Nest
- 1972: Ben
- 1973: Walking Tall
- 1975: Framed
