= Paula (1952 film) =

1952 film directed by Rudolph Maté

- Film poster
- Directed by: Rudolph Maté
- Screenplay by: James Poe; William Sackhelm
- Produced by: Buddy Adler
- Starring: Loretta Young; Kent Smith; Alexander Knox
- Cinematography: Charles Lawton Jr.
- Edited by: Viola Lawrence
- Music by: George Duning
- Production company: Columbia Pictures
- Distributed by: Columbia Pictures
- Release date: May 15, 1952
- Running time: 80 minutes
- Country: United States
- Language: English

Paula (reissued as The Silent Voice) is a 1952 American film noir drama film directed by Rudolph Maté, and starring Loretta Young, Kent Smith, and Alexander Knox. It was produced and distributed by Columbia Pictures.

== Plot ==
Distraught after her second miscarriage, and learning definitively she could never have children, Paula Rogers, while driving at night, accidentally injures a child. Confused, and also expected to attend a function that honors her husband, Paula tries to follow the child to the hospital but the farmer who witnesses the accident believes Paula to be drunk, so he takes the child in his truck and drives away before Paula can get into her car. She tries to follow but is too far away and gets stuck at a train crossing, losing sight of the farmer’s truck. She attempts to tell her husband about the incident, but has trouble finding the right time.

Later, overcome with remorse, she looks to get close to this child and becomes a helper at the hospital. The child is an orphan with limited health care available. The doctor recognizes Paula's need to be useful and asks if she would become his speech therapist and guardian. She finds meaning and purpose in her life as she engages the little boy in intensive therapy necessary to recover his ability to speak.

== Cast ==
- Loretta Young as Paula Rogers
- Kent Smith as John Rogers
- Alexander Knox as Dr. Clifford Frazer
- Tommy Rettig as David Larson
- Otto Hulett as Dr Lieutenant Dargen
- Will Wright as Raymond Bascom
- Raymond Greenleaf as President Russell
- Ann Doran as Mrs. Smith
- Gertrude Astor as Mrs. Brown
- Dick Gordon as Mr Brown
- Kathryn Card as Nurse Gussie
- Helen Dickson as Mrs. Lazlo
- William Vedder as Dean Tom Cornwall
- Frances Morris as Miss Turner
- Katherine Warren as Mary
- Charles Meredith as Dr. Walter T. Farrell
- Everett Glass as Professor
- Franklyn Farnum as Professor
- Roy Engel as Detective Sergeant
- Ellanora Needles as Nurse
- Jeanne Bates as Attending Nurse
- Ann Tyrrell as Nurse Receptionist

== Bibliography ==
- Dick, Bernard F. Hollywood Madonna: Loretta Young. University Press of Mississippi, 2011.
