= The Enemy I Kill =

Fiction novel

The Enemy I Kill (Totem Dream)
- Cover of the 1974 Pan paperback edition
- Published: Canada and the UK, 1972; US, 1973

The Enemy I Kill is a novel by Canadian actor and author Alexander Knox, published in Canada and the United Kingdom in 1972. It was republished in the United States as Totem Dream in 1973.

== Synopsis ==
This historical novel is set initially in Lake Erie during the spring of 1770 and follows the adventures of 17-year-old Calvin Heggie, his older friend, and two Indian girls, in the forests of Canada.

== Sources ==
- Bickham, Jack M. (June 24, 1973). "Early North Provides Rare Novel Setting". Fort Worth Star-Telegram. p. 113.
- Di Bartolomeo, E. (May 5, 1973). "Press Book Shelf / Totem Dream". The Pittsburgh Press. p. 19.
- Dortmund, E. K. (May 26, 1973). "Book beat / 'Totem Dream' by Alexander Knox". Salem Capital Journal. p. 43.
- "Totem Dream". WorldCat.
