= Four Boys and a Gun =

1957 film by William A. Berke

- Theatrical release poster
- Directed by: William Berke
- Screenplay by: Leo Townsend; Philip Yordan
- Based on: Four Boys and a Gun by Willard Wiener
- Produced by: William Berke
- Starring: Frank Sutton; Tarry Green; James Franciscus; William Hinnant; Otto Hulett; Robert Dryden
- Cinematography: J. Burgi Contner
- Edited by: Marie Montague; Everett Sutherland
- Music by: Albert Glasser; Stan Rubin (song I'll Never Get Mad Again)
- Production company: Security Pictures
- Distributed by: United Artists
- Release date: January 1957
- Running time: 74 minutes
- Country: United States
- Language: English

Four Boys and a Gun is a 1957 American film noir crime film directed by William Berke and written by Leo Townsend and Philip Yordan. The film stars Frank Sutton, Tarry Green, James Franciscus, William Hinnant, Otto Hulett and Robert Dryden. The film was released in January 1957, by United Artists.

== Plot ==
Four "boys," Ollie, Eddie, Johnny and Stanley walk into an arena where amateur boxing matches are being held. They carry out a robbery of the box office, using a gun, and in the process a police officer is murdered. It is not revealed who actually did the shooting. They take the money and each goes his separate way. It doesn't take long for the police to figure out who carried out the robbery, and they all end up in the police station being questioned about the robbery. The district attorney goes to each one and the audience is given their story. Ollie is a runner for a bookie who has skimmed $300 from his boss and in trouble for not being able to pay it back—he is beaten up once, and faces more unless he can come up with the money. Johnny is married and his wife is expecting a baby. He also makes his living as an amateur fighter; however, he loses that opportunity. Stanley is a disappointment to his father and only a follower. He is short, small and always picked on. Eddie lost his job as a truck driver, when he hits his boss after finding out that boss has stolen his girlfriend, the delivery company's secretary.

While at the district attorney's office, the DA reveals to them that the four face the death penalty for the murder of the police officer. He tells them that if the one who actually did the shooting steps forward, the other three could get off with a lesser charge and shorter prison sentence. Flashbacks reveal the days that led up to the robbery and the reasons why each went through with it.

Left on their own, the four argue as to who should take responsibility, but finally agree to roll dice and the "winner" would take the rap, letting the other three live. Eddie ends up the one who must claim to have pulled the trigger. But in the end, they all decide to take the rap together, even if it means they all must die in the electric chair.

== Cast ==
- Frank Sutton as Ollie Denker
- Tarry Green as Eddie Richards
- James Franciscus as Johnny Doyle
- William Hinnant as Stanley Badek
- Otto Hulett as District Attorney
- Robert Dryden as Joe Barton
- J. Pat O'Malley as Fight manager
- Diana Herbert as Marie
- Patricia Sloan as Nita
- Patricia Bosworth as Elizabeth
- David Burns as Television man
- Anne Seymour as Mrs. Richards
- Frank Gero as Slim
- Ned Glass as Landlord
- Karl Swenson as Mr. Badek
- Lisa Osten as Mrs. Badek
- Sid Raymond as Cab driver

== Home media ==
The film was released on DVD in 2011 by 20th Century Fox Home Entertainment
