= Hornets' Nest =

1970 film by Franco Cirino, Phil Karlson

- Original American film poster
- Directed by: Phil Karlson; Franco Cirino
- Written by: Stanley Colbert (story); S.S. Schweitzer
- Produced by: Stanley S. Canter
- Starring: Rock Hudson; Mark Colleano; Sylva Koscina; Sergio Fantoni; Giacomo Rossi-Stuart; Jacques Sernas
- Cinematography: Gábor Pogány
- Edited by: J. Terry Williams
- Music by: Ennio Morricone
- Distributed by: United Artists
- Release date: September 9, 1970
- Running time: 110 minutes
- Countries: USA; Italy
- Languages: English; German; Italian

Hornets' Nest is a 1970 Italian-American war film directed by Phil Karlson and starring Rock Hudson, Sylva Koscina, and Sergio Fantoni. The plot focuses on a group of boys aged 7–14 who survive a massacre in their village in Northern Italy in 1944 and what happens to them.

== Plot ==
In Northern Italy in 1944, the entire population of the village of Reanoto is massacred by the SS under the command of the cruel Major Sturmbannführer Taussig for helping the Italian resistance movement. The only survivors are a group of young boys, aged 7 to 14, led by Aldo, who witnessed the mass execution and vow revenge.

That night, a detachment of US Army paratrooper saboteurs jump into the area with a mission to destroy a strategic dam with the partisans prior to the Fifth United States Army's advance into the area. Their drop zone has been discovered by Wehrmacht troops under the command of Hauptmann Friedrich von Hecht, who kill them all except the leader of the paratroopers, Captain Turner, who is rendered unconscious and goes unnoticed by the Germans when he lands in the branches of a tree. The Germans capture the demolition equipment from the dead Americans.

Aldo and his friends rescue Turner by spiriting him away from the ambush. Realizing that Turner needs medical attention, they kidnap German doctor Bianca Freedling, to nurse him to health, and keeping her captive even after Turner's recovery. In order to avenge the massacre of Reanoto, Aldo wants Turner to train him and his friends in the use of military weapons and tactics. Turner uses the opportunity as a second chance to complete his sabotage mission, using the boys instead of his late command. He has the boys steal the captured American demolition gear from von Hecht's headquarters, killing SS Rottenführer Gunther in the process, but Aldo hides the detonators until Turner leads them in their revenge. He trains them to use German MP 40 guns.

Turner and the doctor go to look at the dam. The doctor tries to stab Turner with a pair of scissors and then runs towards a passing German armored car but Turner drags her into cover and rapes her.

In response to the killing of Gunther, Standartenführer Jannings hunts for Turner and his "Dead End Kids" an SS-led affair, placing von Hecht under the command of Taussig and reassigning his regular Wehrmacht troops to guard a tunnel. Not long after this, Turner and the boys steal a truck and drive to SS headquarters, slaughtering all of Taussig's men in a surprise attack. Killing the SS was enough for most of the boys, but not for Aldo, who is becoming emotionally and mentally unhinged. He wants to keep killing Germans.

Von Hecht, after an argument, shoots and kills Taussig in the aftermath of the attack on SS headquarters, and goes after Turner and the boys solo. While Turner and a few of the boys are planting Composition C charges on the dam, Aldo and a few of the others go against orders and directly engage the German guards on top of the dam, which very nearly costs the entire mission. Taking over an MG 42, Aldo becomes blood-drunk as he mows down Germans, even going so far as to shoot down his own friend Carlo when Carlo blocks his shot. Despite interference from von Hecht, Turner and the kids successfully plant the explosives and blow up the dam, flooding the valley.

With the dam destroyed and the Germans routed, the American troops begin moving in. When Turner learns of Carlo's death, as well as that of another boy who died protecting Bianca and some of the younger children, he regrets having involved the children and breaks all of the guns. Aldo however refuses to hand his over, and runs off, encountering von Hecht, who survived the destruction of the dam. Aldo shoots and wounds him just as Turner catches up to him, and after failing to talk him out of finishing the German officer off, prevents him by force, taking his gun away. He takes von Hecht prisoner as von Hecht expresses his admiration for Turner's success.

Turner, Bianca, von Hecht and all of the surviving boys except for Aldo go down to meet the approaching column of American soldiers. Aldo lingers. After seeing to it that the others are safely aboard a truck, Turner goes back for Aldo, who angrily throws rocks at him because he stopped him from killing von Hecht. But finally he is overcome with remorse for having killed Carlo, and begs Turner's forgiveness. Turner gives it, and scoops the defeated and frightened boy up, and carries him to the waiting truck.

== Cast ==
- Rock Hudson as Capt. Turner
- Sylva Koscina as Dr. Bianca Freedling
- Sergio Fantoni as Capt. Friedrich von Hecht
- Giacomo Rossi-Stuart as Sgt. Schwalberg
- Jacques Sernas as Maj. Taussig
- Mark Colleano as Aldo
- Mauro Gravina as Carlo
- John Fordyce as Dino
- Giuseppe Cassuto as Franco
- Amedeo Castracane as Tonio
- Giancarlo Colombaioni as Romeo
- Ronald Colombaioni as Mikko
- Valerio Colombaioni as Arturo
- Giuseppe Coppola as Rico
- Luigi Criscuolo as Paolo
- Gaetano Danaro as Umberto
- Vincenzo Danaro as Silvio
- Daniel Dempsey as Giorgio
- Anna-Luisa Giacinti as Maria
- Daniel Keller as Tekko
- Mauro Orsi as Luigi
- Maurizio-Fabrizio Tempio as Mario
- Jean Valmont as Scarpi
- Rod Dana as US Colonel
- Tom Felleghy as Col. Jannings
- Andrea Bosic as Gen. von Kleber
- Andrea Esterhazy as Gen. Dohrmann
- Mino Doro as Italian Doctor
- Gérard Herter as Capt. Kreuger
- Jacques Stany as Sgt. Ehrlich
- Hardy Stuart as Cpl. Gunther
- Marco Gobbi as Sgt. Hermann
- Max Turilli as Col. Weede
- Alan Chammas as 1st German Sentry
- Amos Davoli as 2nd German Sentry
- Goffredo Unger as Cpl. Merkel
- Larry Dolgin as Pilot
- William Conroy as German Soldier (uncredited)

== Production ==
Hudson had previously had success with several military roles, such as Ice Station Zebra. After the failure of the large budgeted Darling Lili, he thought an action war film geared to the youth market directed by the experienced Phil Karlson had potential. The female lead was originally to have been played by Sophia Loren, but she dropped out at the last moment and was replaced by Koscina. Koscina, who had a childhood in World War II Yugoslavia, felt that the idea of the film—how war can destroy one's mental health as well as one's physical health—was an interesting one.

Though set in 1944, the hairstyles, American fatigues and attitudes are from the late 1960s, with Hudson first wearing the mustache he would have throughout the 1970s. Time magazine called the film "a weird little war movie full of bizarre energy and merciless violence, a kind of 'Dirty Dozen Reach Puberty'". Ennio Morricone's score included a whistling theme that was used in the film by the children themselves.

Michael Avallone wrote a novelization of the film as a tie-in. An exploitation guide for cinema owners suggested dressing up boys under 15 in army uniforms and putting actual hornets' nests (hopefully without their makers) in shop windows to promote the film.

== See also ==
- List of American films of 1970
