= Saturday's Hero =

1951 film

- Theatrical release poster
- Directed by: David Miller
- Screenplay by: Sidney Buchman; Millard Lampell
- Based on: The Hero; 1949 novel by Millard Lampell
- Produced by: Buddy Adler
- Starring: John Derek; Donna Reed; Sidney Blackmer; Alexander Knox
- Cinematography: Lee Garmes
- Edited by: William Lyon
- Music by: Elmer Bernstein
- Distributed by: Columbia Pictures
- Release date: September 11, 1951 (New York)
- Running time: 111 min.
- Country: United States
- Language: English
- Box office: $1,150,000 (U.S. rentals)

Saturday's Hero (also known as Idols in the Dust) is a 1951 American sports drama film noir directed by David Miller and starring John Derek and Donna Reed.

== Plot ==
Steve Novak, a Polish-American immigrant from a small New Jersey mill town, attends Jackson University in Virginia to play football. He becomes a star player as a freshman but hears stories of teammates receiving money for their play.

Steve falls for Melissa, the niece of one of the school's rich benefactors, T. C. McCabe. When he suffers injuries on the field, Steve realizes that a college education will mean more to his future than will football. He tries to win Melissa's love over T. C.’s strong objections.

== Cast ==
- John Derek as Steve Novak
- Donna Reed as Melissa
- Sidney Blackmer as T. C. McCabe
- Alexander Knox as Professor Megroth
- Elliott Lewis as Eddie Adams
- Otto Hulett as Coach "Preacher" Tennant
- Howard St. John as Belfrage
- Aldo Ray as Gene Hausler (as Aldo DaRe)
- Alvin Baldock as Francis 'Clay' Clayborne
- Wilbur Robertson as Bob Whittier
- Charles Mercer Barnes as Moose Wagner
- Bill Martin as Joe Mestrovic
- Mickey Knox as Joey Novak
- Sandro Giglio as Poppa Jan Novak
- Tito Vuolo as Manuel

== Production ==
Columbia Pictures purchased the film rights to the novel The Hero by Millard Lampell specifically as a vehicle for John Derek.

The film, with a working title of The Hero, was shot over the course of 80 days, including 35 days of football sequences.

The musical score was the first Elmer Bernstein composition for a feature film.

== Reception ==
In a contemporary review for The New York Times, critic Bosley Crowther wrote:

The slight trace of cynicism which some churlish people seem to have toward college football as it is played in some quarters under the pretense of being an amateur sport will, we suspect, be supported by the picture Columbia has made under the title of 'Saurday's Hero' ... For there isn't much doubt that Columbia (the studio, that is) has punched a hole right through the ivy curtain and revealed what appears to be a frightful mess. Hooting with fiendish derision at all the good old rah-rah-college attitudes so often expressly ennobled in certain items from. Hollywood, Millard Lampell and Sidney Buchman have ripped out a sulphurous script which makes college football look more vicious than organized mugging and the white slave trade. And David Miller has solemnly directed a cast of men and monsters in this heinous tale about as much exposure of debasement as a tender soul can stand.

== See also ==
- List of American football films
