= Otto Hulett =

American actor

- Born: February 27, 1898
- Died: September 1, 1983 (aged 85)

Otto Hulett (February 27, 1898 – September 1, 1983) was an American film, television and stage actor.

Hulett was born in Salina, Kansas. As an actor, he was best known for his roles in The Mob (1951), Saturday's Hero (1951), and Carbine Williams (1952).

For three summers, 1943, 1945, and 1951, Hulett was part of the summer stock cast at Denver's Elitch Theatre.

He died in Katonah, New York.

== Partial filmography ==
- One Third of a Nation (1939)
- The Mob (1951)
- Her First Romance (1951)
- Saturday's Hero (1951)
- You for Me (1952)
- Carbine Williams (1952)
- Sally and Saint Anne (1952)
- Paula (1952)
- Francis Goes to West Point (1952)
- City That Never Sleeps (1953)
- Ambush at Tomahawk Gap (1953)
- The Phenix City Story (1955), as Hugh A. Bentley
- Reprisal! (1956)
- Four Boys and a Gun (1957)

== Partial theatre ==
- Personal Appearance (1934)
- Born Yesterday (1946)
