= Cornered (1945 film) =

1945 film by Edward Dmytryk

- Theatrical release poster
- Directed by: Edward Dmytryk
- Screenplay by: John Paxton
- Adaptation by: John Wexley
- Story by: John Wexley
- Produced by: Adrian Scott
- Starring: Dick Powell; Walter Slezak
- Cinematography: Harry J. Wild
- Edited by: Joseph Noriega
- Music by: Roy Webb; Paul Sawtell
- Distributed by: RKO Radio Pictures
- Release date: December 25, 1945
- Running time: 102 minutes
- Country: United States
- Language: English
- Budget: $500,000

Cornered is a 1945 American mystery thriller film noir starring Dick Powell and directed by Edward Dmytryk. This is the second teaming of Powell and Dmytryk (after Murder, My Sweet). The screenplay was written by John Paxton with uncredited help from Ben Hecht.

== Plot ==
After the end of World War II, a former POW, Canadian RCAF flyer Laurence Gerard, returns to France to discover who ordered the killing of his bride of only 20 days, she being a member of the French Resistance. His father-in-law Étienne Rougon identifies Vichy collaborator Marcel Jarnac. He supposedly died in 1943, but Rougon has strong doubts. Jarnac was careful about maintaining his anonymity and the police have no description of him. But his own associate compiled a dossier on him; Gerard finds a burned fragment of it, and an envelope addressed to Madame Jarnac. From this he manages to track the widow to Buenos Aires.

When he arrives Gerard is met by Melchior Incza, a stranger who appears to know all too much about him. The suspicious Canadian initially rejects Incza's offer of help, but cannot turn down his invitation to a party hosted by Madame Jarnac's associate, wealthy businessman Tomas Camargo, for the opportunity to mingle with their social set. There he meets Camargo's uncle, lawyer Manuel Santana, and the widow herself.

When Gerard later questions Madame Jarnac in her hotel room, she refuses to co-operate, so he starts openly following her. Santana asks him to desist, but will not say why. Later, Gerard finds a valet, Diego, tidying up his hotel room at an odd hour.

Eventually, Madame Jarnac agrees to provide him with the information he desires. A note is delivered to Gerard informing him that Jarnac is leaving the country that night under the name of Ernest Dubois, and giving his address; but it is a forgery. Gerard is only stopped from shooting the wrong man in cold blood by the timely intervention of Santana and Diego. Dubois is actually their associate; it turns out that they are after not only Jarnac but his secret Nazi organisation as well. "Madame Jarnac" is being paid to act as the wife of a man she has never seen.

To stir things up, Gerard tricks Incza into believing he has the full dossier on Jarnac. Incza breaks into the hotel safe, but it is not there. Gerard is sent to Camargo's room, where Camargo's wife keeps him busy by trying to seduce him into her life of luxury and easy vice. Gerard kisses her, but rejects her advances; he still loves his wife, although "Her teeth were crooked and she was too thin". He tells the señora he is "bored" and cannot wait any longer for Camargo.

Meanwhile, Incza has been searching Gerard's room and realises there is no dossier. When the "valet" Diego interrupts, Incza kills him. Gerard returns and is detained as a murder suspect, but a waiter confirms his alibi. Still, Gerard is given 48 hours to leave the country.

When Incza tells him that Jarnac will be seeing Camargo at his "old office", Gerard decides to stake out a bar Madame Jarnac recalls was once their meeting place. It is a trap. Gerard is captured, and Jarnac finally makes his appearance.

Incza attempts to betray Jarnac to Camargo, before realising Jarnac is there. Hoping to regain Jarnac's trust, he reveals that there is no dossier. Jarnac kills him. Gerard is to die as well, with Camargo to say that the two men shot each other. Camargo objects, but Jarnac threatens him with a paper in his possession. Gerard seizes the distraction to overpower Jarnac. He punches Jarnac over and over until Santana and Dubois arrive. Jarnac is dead, but Gerard shows them the paper detailing Jarnac's connection to Camargo. As Santana tells the police, this should be sufficient to expose the entire organization.

== Cast ==
- Dick Powell as Laurence Gerard
- Walter Slezak as Melchior Incza
- Micheline Cheirel as Mme. Madeleine Jarnac (Laurent)
- Nina Vale as Señora Camargo
- Morris Carnovsky as Manuel Santana
- Edgar Barrier as DuBois, insurance agent
- Steven Geray as Señor Tomas Camargo
- Jack La Rue as Diego
- Gregory Gaye as Perchon, Belgian banker and Jarnac's accomplice
- Luther Adler as Marcel Jarnac
- Ellen Corby as Maid (uncredited)
- Byron Foulger as Hotel night clerk (uncredited)
- Kenneth MacDonald as Incza's henchman (uncredited)
- Nestor Paiva as Police official (uncredited)

== Background ==
The film production involved four men associated with the film who would later be blacklisted in the 1950s: Edward Dmytryk, Adrian Scott, Morris Carnovsky, and Luther Adler. The political argument against Fascism, which reflected the idealistic political views of the four blacklisted filmmakers, is an important part of the film.

== Reception ==
=== Box office ===
The film made a profit of $413,000.

=== Critical ===
Film critic Bosley Crowther lauded the film and the acting, writing,

Cornered is a drama of smoldering vengeance and political scheming which builds purposefully and with graduating tension to a violent climax, a committing of murder that is as thrilling and brutal as any you are likely to encounter in a month of movie-going. The story, which wanders through England, France and Switzerland, eventually centers in Buenos Aires, where apparently all Europe's escaped Fascists are quietly plotting a return to power. Although the narrative is a bit too obviously contrived. Edward Dmytryk, the director, has squeezed every ounce of suspense and excitement out of the material at hand. All of the players are in there pitching with great zest, and Walter Slezak is especially noteworthy as the ruthless and unscrupulous gent around whose flabby bulk most of the intrigue is spun. Micheline Cheirel brings a wistful charm to the role of the mysterious lady who poses as the supposedly deceased collaborationist's wife, and lesser roles are well done by Morris Carnovsky, Jack LaRue and Luther Adler. Cornered may not be perfect, but it still is a satisfying entertainment.

Critic James Agee writing in The Nation in 1946 stated, "I have never been in Buenos Aires, and I have known few fascists or even people who pretended to be or thought they were—though I know any number who think they aren't—but in casting, business, setting, and, with few exceptions, writing and costuming the picture consistently convinced and excited me." In a review of the film, Channel 4 wrote, "Consolidating his transformation from soft tenor to hard-boiled private eye in Dmytryk's Murder My Sweet the year before, Powell is even more dour as a tough, cynical loner in search of the man who killed his French wife during the Second World War...The noir atmosphere is sustained well throughout."

The Classic Film Guide calls the film a mess in their review, "The plot is so confusing, with so many twists and turns, you'll get whiplash trying to keep up, if you're even interested enough to try. Plus, if you've ever read a Robert Ludlum novel (particularly The Rhinemann Exchange), you'll be sorely disappointed in the intelligence (and one-dimensional nature) of Powell's character, and the route he takes to enact his revenge."

== Home media ==
Warner Bros. released the film on DVD on July 13, 2010, in its Film Noir Classic Collection, Vol. 5.

Has been shown on the Turner Classic Movies show 'Noir Alley' with Eddie Muller.
