= Night of the White Bear =

1971 novel by Alexander Knox

- Cover of the English edition
- Author: Alexander Knox
- Published: Toronto: Macmillan of Canada, 1971

Night of the White Bear is a novel of the Arctic by Canadian actor and novelist Alexander Knox, first published by Macmillan of Canada in 1971.

== Synopsis ==
=== Plot ===
The story follows Uglik, a young Eskimo, his journey of survival with two others in the Canadian Arctic, and his final confrontation with the lone polar bear which has stalked them.

=== Characters ===
- Ugluk, a 16 year old Eskimo;
- Joe, an old Eskimo tribesman;
- Pakti, a young Eskimo woman, Joe's wife;
- The White Bear.

== Reception ==
Night of the White Bear was Knox's second work of fiction. Contemporary reviewers noted the strong sexual and anthropological themes of the novel.

== Sources ==
- Blackburn, Sara (January 2, 1972). "Novels / Night of the White Bear". Chicago Tribune. p. 261.
- Knox, Alexander (1971). Night of the White Bear. Toronto: Macmillan of Canada.
- Legate, David M. (August 28, 1971). "Moby Dick in fur". The Montreal Star. p. 23.
- Ruhen, Olaf (September 18, 1971). "Of love and hate for the Arctic". The Melbourne Age. p. 16.
- Walker, Danny (October 31, 1971). "Odessey of Arctic Is Intriguing Tale". The Jackson Sun. p. 52.
