= Raider's Moon =

1976 novel by Alexander Knox

- Cover of the first edition
- Author: Alexander Knox
- Published: St. Martin's Press, 1976

Raider's Moon is a novel by Alexander Knox, first published in 1976.

== Synopsis ==
This historical novel of 1790 colonial Canada follows 21-year-old Alan Armistead as he carries a message intended to thwart a conspiracy to steal furs from the Hudson Bay Company. He is joined by a mysterious and beautiful girl.

== Sources ==
- Koehn, Sally (March 27, 1977). "Withers Library offering books for escape reading / Raiders Moon". The Pantagraph. p. 49.
- Schaefer, Patricia (February 12, 1977). "New at the Muncie Library / Raider's Moon". Muncie Evening Press. p. 24.
- "Library Books / 'Rader's Moon'". The Jeffersonian Democrat. December 30, 1976. p. 9.
