= Declaration of martial law in Russell County, Alabama =

1954 declaration of martial law in Alabama, United States

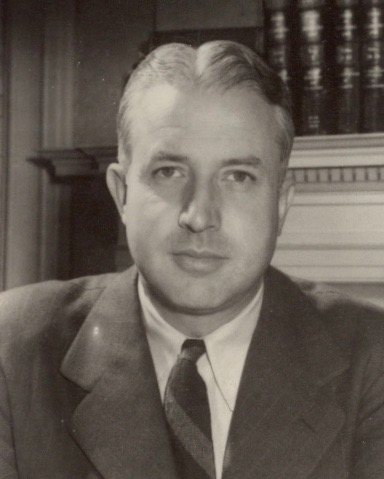
Alabama Governor (1951–1955) Gordon Persons

On July 22, 1954, a limited state of martial law was declared in Russell County, Alabama, by Governor Gordon Persons. The county, particularly Phenix City, had become lawless, and Persons lost faith in the local law enforcement, which had been implicated in illegal gambling syndicates, political corruption, and the murder of Albert Patterson, the Democratic Party's nominee for Attorney General of Alabama. Under the martial law proclamation, the city police department and the county sheriff's office were stood down, and their duties were assumed by the Alabama National Guard.

The National Guard, under Major General Walter J. Hanna, took steps to disarm the citizenry and to close down gambling establishments and premises serving alcohol. By November, the National Guard had restored order and helped to facilitate the first free elections in the city for decades. The state of martial law was lifted on January 17, 1955. After an investigation by the state's acting attorney general, Russell County's chief deputy sheriff was convicted for the murder of Patterson, whose son, John Malcolm Patterson, was later elected attorney general and then governor.

== Background ==
Russell County within Alabama

The city of Girard, in Russell County, Alabama, was dependent upon the liquor trade, being home to two major whiskey warehouses. The state outlawed the sale of liquor in 1914 but it continued in Girard with local officials turning a blind eye. In 1916 the Alabama State Attorney General Logan Martin intervened, sending armed deputies to the city and appointing a special prosecutor to take charge. A grand jury subsequently convicted the city marshal for accepting bribes, impeached Pal Daniel, the Russell County Sheriff, for conspiring with criminals and forced the resignation of the mayor and board of aldermen. Martin's deputies carried out the largest liquor raid in the South at that time, disposing of 1,000,000 US gallons (3,800,000 L) of whisky into the Chattahoochee River in a single day. In 1918, just across the Chattahoochee, the U.S. Army opened Fort Benning, and hundreds of soldiers were soon travelling into Russell County to visit its brothels, liquor shops and gambling houses. During the Roaring Twenties and under national prohibition of alcohol the criminal element in the county flourished; Daniel was even re-elected as sheriff. An attempt to curb lawlessness by merging Girard with neighboring Phenix City failed with the new city authorities being corrupted.

In the 1930s, the city authorities entered agreements with criminals to selectively enforce laws in exchange for contributions to the treasury. The numerous gambling halls and brothels would be raided to keep up pretences but faced only fines or 30-day suspensions of their licences. The three-man city commission was in league with the local crime lords who ran the liquor, gambling and prostitution rackets. Elections for the county sheriff, city police commissioner, and other offices were fixed with votes being bought for up to $10 each. Criminal elements even took seats on the chamber of commerce and school and hospital boards. Many of these men were also members of the Ku Klux Klan, who held an annual torchlight parade and cross-burning in the city. Jury selection was rigged with many deceased residents remaining on the lists; if called to serve, their places were taken by criminals.

Despite widespread illegal lotteries being exposed in the 1938 Ritz Café disaster during which 24 people were killed after a gambling house collapsed, the state governor refused to intervene. Fort Benning was expanded during World War II and at one point housed 80,000 troops, boosting the illegal economy. An official Army estimate reported that some 80% of the soldiers visited Phenix City and more than half of their pay was spent there. The US Secretary of War Henry L. Stimson called Phenix "the wickedest city in America" and Major General George Patton, who was stationed at Fort Benning, proposed using his tanks to raze the city to the ground. The Shephard-Matthews crime syndicate, which had controlled a significant part of the city's economy for years, moved out of illegal enterprise in 1951. This move was welcomed by reform campaigners but led to increased lawlessness as its place was taken by less restrained criminals. By 1954, the illegal economy in the city was worth $100 million a year.

== Patterson murder and state response ==
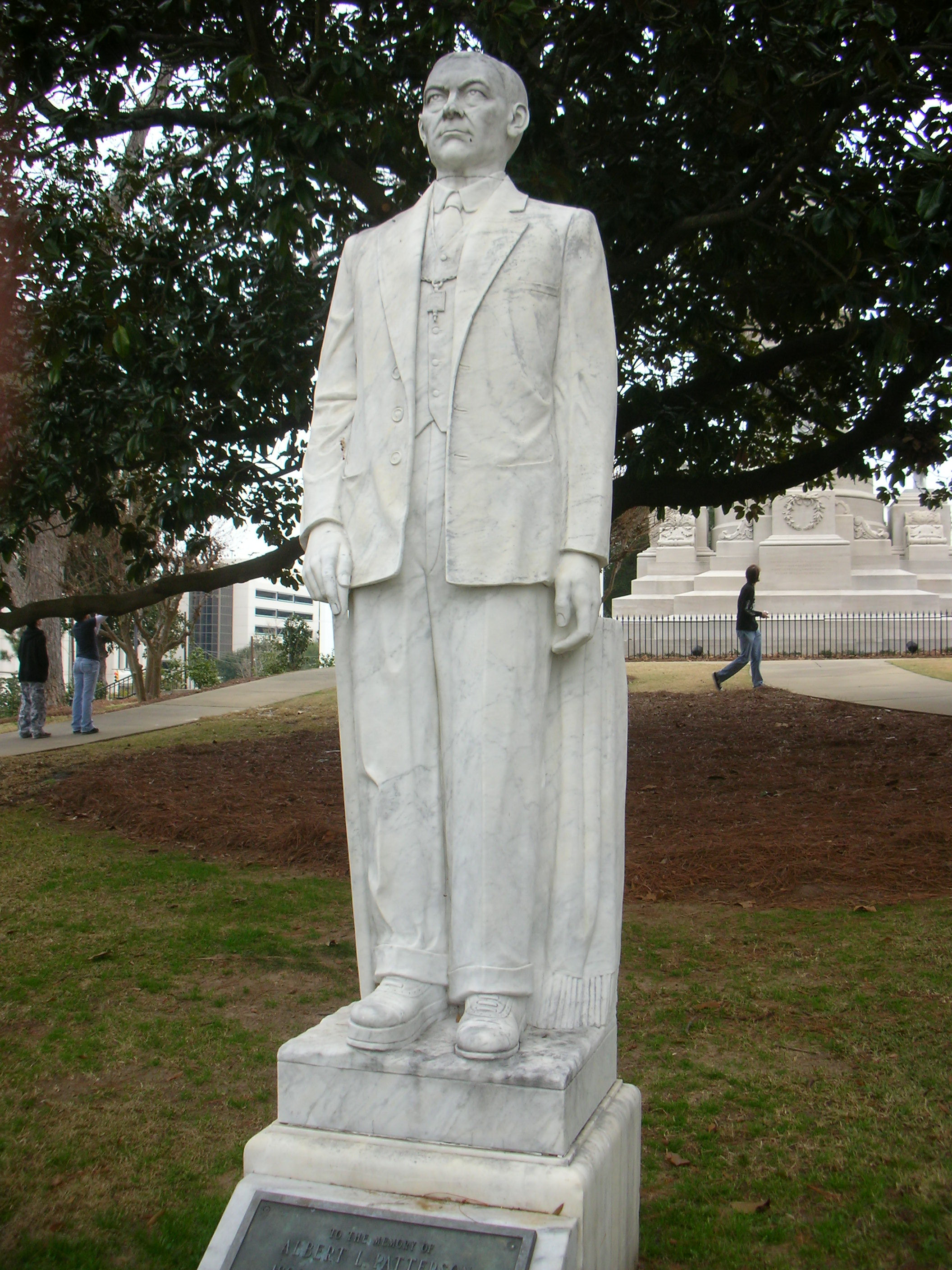
A statue erected in memory of Albert Patterson

Ahead of the 1954 elections for the Attorney General of Alabama, Phenix City resident and lawyer Albert Patterson ran a campaign for the Democratic Party nomination on a platform of ridding the city of crime. Despite voting irregularities, he won the primary election, but was assassinated by shooting shortly afterwards on June 18, 1954, near his offices in Phenix City. Patterson's murder caused unrest in Phenix City, with the Citizen's Betterment Association informing Governor Gordon Persons that the city was on the verge of anarchy. Despite having been reluctant to intervene in Russell County's lawlessness, Persons immediately ordered the state-controlled Alabama Highway Patrol into the city. He also requested federal assistance from the Federal Bureau of Investigation (FBI) on the reasoning that the murderer could have crossed state lines into Georgia.

Persons also ordered Major General Walter J. Hanna, Adjutant General of the Alabama National Guard, to the city to assess whether troops were needed to keep the peace. Hanna arrived in Phenix City in the early morning of June 19 with command over a number of locally-based troops and some brought from elsewhere in the state. In theory, they were there to assist the local law enforcement, but he soon came to distrust them and suspect their involvement in illegal activities. Hanna issued orders that all gambling was to cease and, two days later, led a force of state highway patrolmen and National Guard forces on raids that seized almost 100 illegal gambling devices. As they had no legal authority, the force was unable to access private clubs or rooms or to make arrests.

Hanna organized a counterintelligence operation by his guardsmen, partly undercover, to investigate the gambling syndicates. The operation determined that city police and county deputies were watching the guard's movements and tipping off gangsters as to the timing and location of raids. At the same time, a local grand jury had failed to make any progress with the Patterson murder investigation. Hanna recommended to Persons that martial law be declared to allow the National Guard to take responsibility for law enforcement from the local agencies. Hanna later said, "It was a whole damn town of ill repute. We uncovered 28 murders that had taken place in the previous four years, without even an indictment, much less a conviction. Much of the time, it was cheaper – and safer – to kill people than to buy 'em, because dead people stay dead."

== Declaration of martial law ==
Proclamation of martial law

Whereas, organized crime has for many years existed in Russell County, Alabama, particularly in Phenix City; and Whereas, a gang of men have conspired and are conspiring to thrive on the systematic exploitation of vice; and Whereas, the organized lawless activities of this gang continue to hamper the investigation of the murder and the ferreting out of the murderer of Albert Patterson and other crimes; and Whereas, there exists in said community a serious emergency, a defiance of the Constitution and laws of Alabama, a state of lawlessness, breach of the peace, organized intimidation and fear, and there is continued and imminent danger thereof, which the local peace officers are unable or unwilling to subdue: Now, Therefore, I, Gordon Persons, as Governor of Alabama and Commander in Chief of the Alabama National Guard, do hereby proclaim a state of qualified martial rule in Russell County, Alabama. I Further instruct the Adjutant General of Alabama, now actively on duty with units of the Alabama National Guard in Russell County, to take over, assume, supersede and exercise all the activities of the sheriff of Russell County, Alabama, the deputy sheriffs of said county, constable, Chief of police of Phenix City, Alabama, and all police officers of said city, and until further order from me to take and continue to take appropriate measures to suppress the state of lawlessness, intimidation, tumult and fear which reigns in said area.

— Gordon Persons, 22 July 1954.

On July 22, 1954, after liaising with US President Dwight Eisenhower and FBI Director J. Edgar Hoover, Governor Persons proclaimed limited martial law in the city, allowing the National Guard to take over law enforcement duties in Russell County. It was reported that the National Guard, armed with machine guns, shotguns and carbines, entered the sheriff's office and police department to disarm local law enforcement and confiscate their badges.

Hanna voided all weapons permits, and by July 23, the troops had confiscated 40 pistols and a submachine gun from the citizenry. Also on July 23, guardsmen checked all beer and liquor-licensed establishments in the city, as they had been known to be frequently flouted. Some of the beer establishments were found to be compliant and permitted to continue, but none of the liquor licenses were renewed. No new licenses were issued until at least 1955. On July 24, Hanna ordered three days of raids on gambling establishments and gathered almost 500 indictments for a newly-reformed grand jury. Hanna and his guardsmen virtually wiped out the local vice syndicate.

Two weeks after the implementation of martial law, the mayor of Phenix City was jailed for neglecting his duties, and the city was administered by a group of military personnel chosen by Hanna. In November 1954, when order in the city had been restored, the first free elections in decades were held, with armed guardsmen at each ballot box and supervising the count. Having stabilized the situation, martial law was rescinded on January 17, 1955, and the city returned to civilian control.

== Aftermath ==
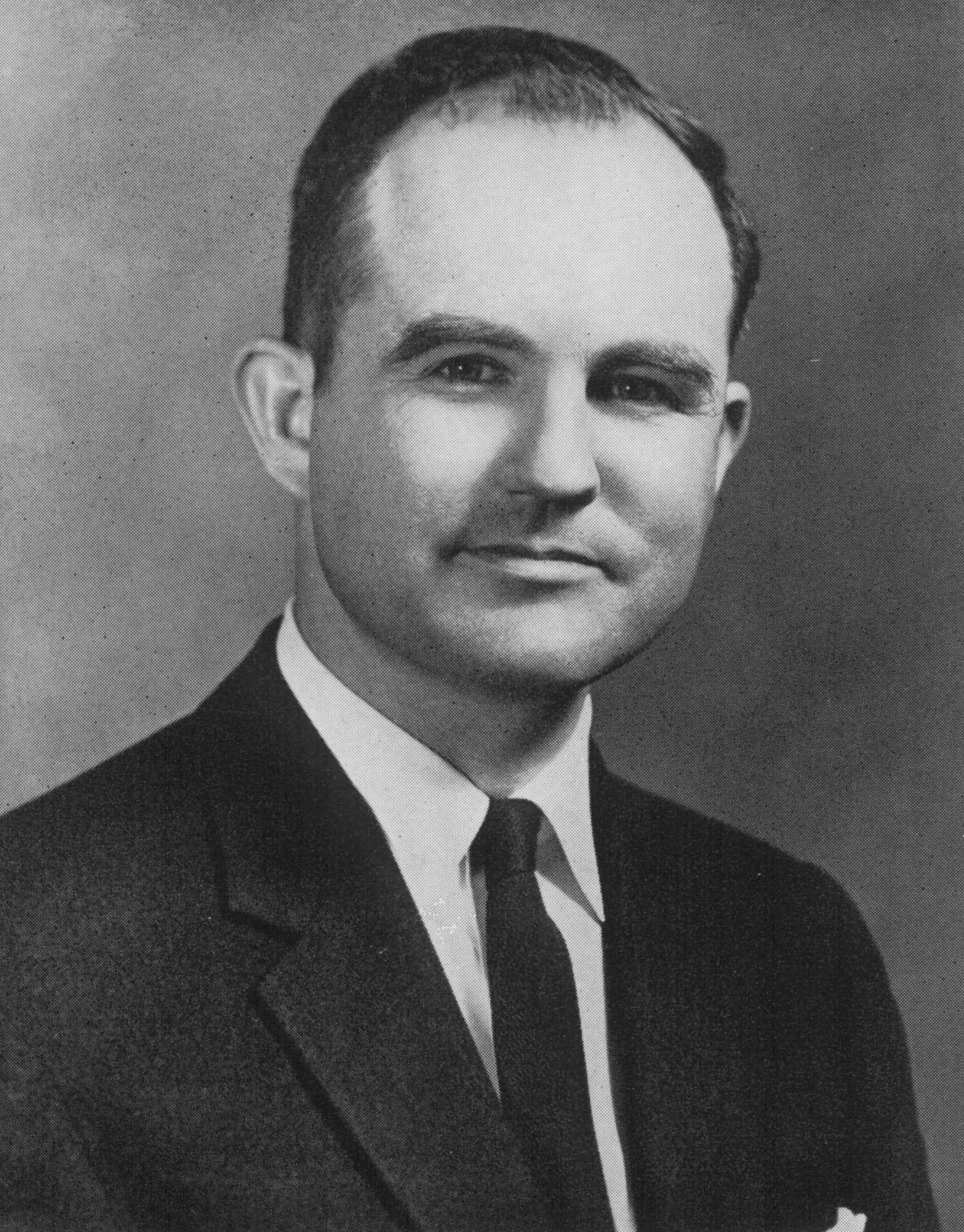
John Malcolm Patterson

With the state Attorney General Si Garrett having checked himself into a mental hospital after being twice questioned over election fraud, the investigation into Patterson's murder and other major crimes in the city was carried out by acting Attorney General Bernard Sykes Jr. with a staff of civilian investigators and attorneys. Under Sykes' direction, a grand jury issued more than 2,500 subpoenas and returned 759 indictments on more than 150 individuals, which was then a record for any grand jury in Alabama. All but two of those indicted were subsequently found guilty. Russell County's chief deputy sheriff, Albert Fuller; the Russell County circuit solicitor (analogous to a district attorney), Arch Ferrell; and the state attorney general, Garrett, were all indicted for Patterson's murder. Fuller was found guilty and sentenced for life; Ferrell was acquitted; and Garrett, who remained in hospital, was never brought to trial. One of the key eyewitnesses to the murder was stabbed to death after testifying in open court.

During his election campaign, Patterson had claimed it might take ten years to rid Phenix City of its lawlessness. His death and the subsequent imposition of martial law had meant it was accomplished in just seven months. In 1974, The New York Times described the campaign as highly successful and stated that it had led to 20 years of relatively-low crime in Phenix City. The incident was then the only instance of martial law being declared in a US city since the Reconstruction era that was not for reasons of civil unrest or natural disaster. John Malcolm Patterson, the son of Albert, was elected Alabama's attorney general in his father's stead in 1955 and held the post until 1959, when he became governor.

General Hanna directed a National Guard officer, Major Hershel Finney, to write a history of the guard's activities in Phenix City. Hanna intended it solely as a historic record, to be used as a reference if a similar situation happened again. However, it found its way into the public sphere and became the basis for Edwin Strickland and Gene Wortsman's 1955 book Phenix City: The Wickedest City in America. A partly-fictionalized account of the incident appeared in the 1955 Allied Artists movie The Phenix City Story.

== Troops involved ==
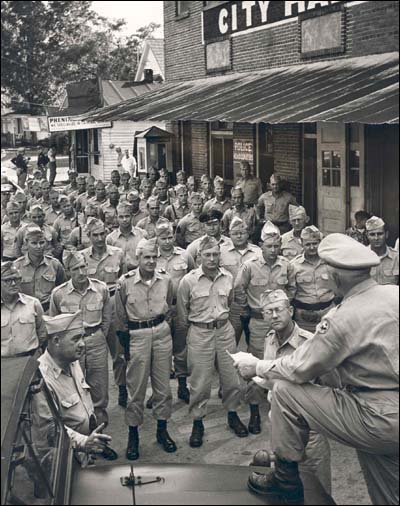
A group of national guardsmen receiving news of their deactivation outside the city hall and police headquarters in Phenix City, early 1955

The troops involved were under the command of Major General Hanna, and numbered around 500 personnel at any given time. The troops were drawn mainly from the Alabama Army National Guard, but some units of the Alabama Air National Guard were also used. As part of the operation, Phenix City was declared off-limits to U.S. Army personnel stationed at Fort Benning, and additional military police were stationed on the 14th Street and Dillingham bridges to prevent a breach of that order.

The Phenix City Civil Disturbance Medal was awarded to civilian and military personnel for service from June 18, 1954, to January 17, 1955, and was awarded to approximately 600 national guardsmen. In all, 1,000 medals were produced for the Alabama state government by the Medallic Art Company.

The troops deployed were drawn from the following units:

Infantry

- Headquarters Company of the 31st Infantry Division (Birmingham)
- Headquarters Company of the 167th Infantry Regiment (Birmingham)
- Headquarters Company of the 1st Battalion of the 167th Infantry Regiment (Opelika)
- Headquarters Company of the 3rd Battalion of the 167th Infantry Regiment (Birmingham)
- Company A of the 167th Infantry Regiment (Lanett)
- Company C of the 167th Infantry Regiment (Phenix City)
- Company K of the 167th Infantry Regiment (Homewood)
- Heavy Mortar Company of the 167th Infantry Regiment (Langdale)
- Headquarters Company of the 200th Infantry Regiment (Tuscaloosa)

Artillery

- Headquarters battery of the 142nd Anti Aircraft Artillery Battalion (Montgomery)
- Headquarters battery of the 104th Anti Aircraft Artillery Battalion (Montgomery)

Support units

- State headquarters detachment (Montgomery)
- 117th Military Police Company (Birmingham)
- 31st Signal Company (Birmingham)
- 31st Military Police Company (Mobile)
- 109th Ordnance Company (Phenix City)

Air National Guard

- 160th Tactical Reconnaissance Squadron (Montgomery)
- Headquarters Squadron of the 117th Tactical Reconnaissance Wing (Birmingham)

== Sources ==
- Bernstein, Lee (2009), The Greatest Menace: Organized Crime in Cold War America, University of Massachusetts Press, ISBN 978-1-55849-747-4
- Coakley, Robert W.; Scheips, Paul J.; Demma, Vincent H. (1971), Use of Troops in Civil Disturbances Since World War II, 1945–1965, Office of Military History, U.S. Army
- Grady, Alan (2005), When Good Men Do Nothing: The Assassination of Albert Patterson, University of Alabama Press, ISBN 978-0-8173-5192-2
- Howard, Gene L. (2008), Patterson for Alabama: The Life and Career of John Patterson, University of Alabama Press, ISBN 978-0-8173-1605-1
- Stelpflug, Peggy A.; Hyatt, Richard (2007), Home of the Infantry: The History of Fort Benning, Mercer University Press, ISBN 978-0-88146-087-2
- Stewart, John Craig (1998), The Governors of Alabama, Pelican Publishing, ISBN 978-1-4556-0519-4
- Strickland, Edwin; Wortsman, Gene (1955), Phenix City, Vulcan Press, ISBN 978-5-88019-766-8
- Trest, Warren A. (2008), Nobody But the People: The Life and Times of Alabama's Youngest Governor, Montgomery: New South Books, ISBN 978-1-58838-221-4
