= Tight Spot =

1955 film by Phil Karlson

- Theatrical release poster
- Directed by: Phil Karlson
- Screenplay by: William Bowers
- Based on: Dead Pigeon; 1953 play by Lenard Kantor
- Produced by: Lewis J. Rachmil
- Starring: Ginger Rogers; Edward G. Robinson; Brian Keith
- Cinematography: Burnett Guffey
- Edited by: Viola Lawrence
- Music by: George Duning
- Color process: Black and white
- Production company: Columbia Pictures
- Distributed by: Columbia Pictures
- Release date: March 19, 1955
- Running time: 96 minutes
- Country: United States
- Language: English

Tight Spot is a 1955 American film noir crime film directed by Phil Karlson and starring Ginger Rogers, Edward G. Robinson and Brian Keith. The story was inspired by then prominent U.S. Senator Estes Kefauver's strong-arm tactics in coercing Virginia Hill to testify in the infamous Bugsy Siegel organized crime prosecution. The Democratic senator from Tennessee attracted national attention with the new medium of televised investigation hearings on Capitol Hill in Washington, D.C. The next year saw Kefauver as the Vice Presidential nominee with former Illinois Governor Adlai Stevenson II for the Democrats in the 1956 election against Republican incumbent 34th president Dwight D. Eisenhower and his running mate Richard M. Nixon, who were reelected.

== Plot ==
Sherry Conley is a model who is in prison for a crime she did not knowingly commit. She is offered a deal for her freedom by U.S. attorney Lloyd Hallett if she will testify as a witness in the trial of mobster Benjamin Costain. Hallett hides her in a hotel where he tries to convince her to testify in spite of the danger. She is under the protection of a squad of detectives led by Lt. Vince Striker and Willoughby, Conley's friendly prison matron escort. There she stalls about making a final decision while she enjoys expensive meals from room service, while sparks begin to fly between Lt. Striker and Conley.

Through his corrupt inside contacts, Costain finds out where Conley is being kept and sends his thugs to kill her. Conley is shot in the arm and survives the assassination attempt when Striker kills the assailant, but Willoughby is shot and seriously wounded. When Striker leaves the hotel, Costain's men force Striker into a car and bring him to Costain. But it's not an abduction, as Striker is a corrupt policeman who is working for Costain. Costain has learned that Conley is being transferred to the city jail for added protection, and he tells Striker that he will have to kill Conley himself if he does not help to arrange another murder attempt at the hotel. He is told to leave the bathroom window unlocked for Costain's killer.

At the hotel, Hallett attempts to use Conley's selfish, unsupportive sister Clara to persuade her to testify, but the two sisters only argue and Conley remains uncooperative. Striker inadvertently almost reveals his duplicity to Hallett, but a phone call to Hallett interrupts their conversation and Hallett's train of thought. They learn that Willoughby has died in the hospital. Conley, who liked and respected Willoughby, becomes angry about her death and agrees to testify against Costain. Striker, who cares for Conley, tries to dissuade her but can't, and reluctantly proceeds with the plan to have her killed. Moments before the murderer arrives, Hallett returns to escort Conley to the city jail from which she is to be taken to the courtroom to enter her testimony. While she is changing her clothes in the bedroom, Hallett chats with Striker, and the attorney's banter brings the jumpy Striker to a breaking point. He abruptly kicks open the bedroom door, shoots the killer and saves Conley at the cost of his own life. The unlocked window tells Conley and Hallett that he had set up her murder but at the last moment changed his mind.

Conley takes the stand at Costain's trial, giving her occupation as "gang buster".

== Cast ==
- Ginger Rogers as Sherry Conley
- Edward G. Robinson as Lloyd Hallett
- Brian Keith as Vince Striker
- Lucy Marlow as Prison Girl
- Lorne Greene as Benjamin Costain
- Katherine Anderson as Mrs. Willoughby
- Allen Nourse as Marvin Rickles
- Peter Leeds as Fred Packer
- Doye O'Dell as Mississippi Mac
- Eve McVeagh as Clara Moran
- Frank Gerstle as Jim Hornsby (uncredited)
- John Larch as First Detective (uncredited)

== Production ==
Principal photography on Tight Spot took place from September 7 to October 28, 1954. For Edward G. Robinson, Tight Spot was the second film of a two-picture deal struck with Columbia, when his age and political activity had relegated him to his "B-movie" period. For Ginger Rogers, she was playing against type in the role of a "tough, street-smart gangster's moll."

== Reception ==
When Tight Spot was released, The New York Times reviewer Howard Thompson gave the film a positive review, writing, "'Tight Spot' is a pretty good little melodrama, the kind you keep rooting for, as generally happened when Lenard Kantor's 'Dead Pigeon' appeared on Broadway a while back ... Along the way are some nice, realistic trimmings Mr. Karlson, or somebody, had the bright idea of underscoring the tension with sounds of a televised hillbilly program (glimpsed, too unfortunately). For our money, the best scene, whipped up by scenarist William Bowers, is the anything-but-tender reunion of Miss Rogers and her sister, (Eve McVeagh) – no competition to the two 'Anastasia' stars down the street, but an ugly, blistering pip ... Indeed, Miss Rogers' self-sufficiency throughout hardly suggests anybody's former scapegoat, let alone a potential gone goose. But she tackles her role with obvious, professional relish. Mr. Keith and Mr. Robinson are altogether excellent. Lorne Greene makes a first-rate crime kingpin and Katherine Anderson is a sound, appealing matron."

In a recent review, film historian Leonard Maltin characterized Tight Spot as a "solid little film" with a virtuoso performance by Ginger Rogers. "Rogers, key witness at a N.Y.C.'s crime lord's upcoming trial, does a lot of high-volume Born Yesterday-like verbal sparring with Keith, her police lieutenant bodyguard."

== Preservation ==
The Academy Film Archive preserved Tight Spot in 1997.

== See also ==
- List of American films of 1955
