= The Kidnapped Surgeon =

1977 novel by Alexander Knox

- Author: Alexander Knox
- Published: Macmillan, 1977

The Kidnapped Surgeon is a novel by Alexander Knox, published in 1977.

== Synopsis ==
This historical novel of colonial Canada opens in 1786. American army surgeon Ian Ogilvie struggles to save the life of a half-breed boy, the son of Calvin Heggie by one of his Indian wives, using primitive surgical methods. The character of Calvin Heggie figures in several novels by Knox.

== Sources ==
- Cook, Barrie (May 30, 1977). "History in old-fashioned vein". The Province. p. 22.
- Legate, David M. (June 11, 1977). "Medicine man". The Montreal Star. p. 41.
- Ruhen, Olaf (June 25, 1977). "Practised in the art of deception". The Melbourne Age. p. 20.
- "From Library Bookshelves / The Kidnapped Surgeon". The Miller County Autogram-Sentinel. August 25, 1977. p. 17.
