= Alexander Knox =

Canadian actor and writer (1907–1995)

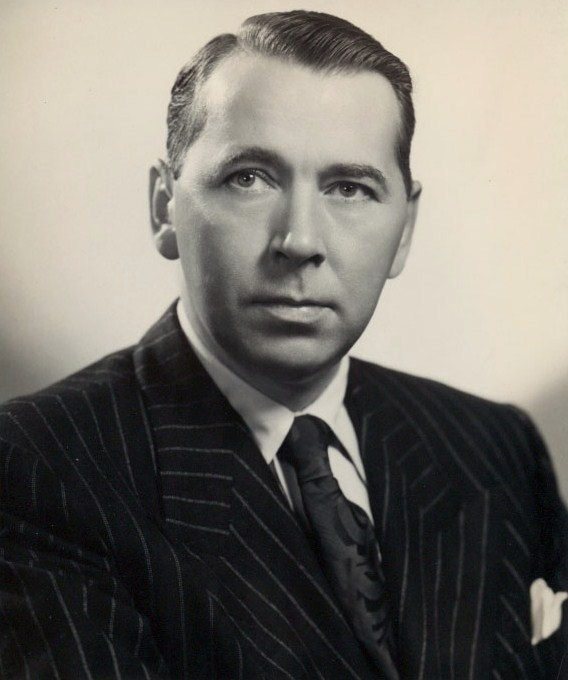
- Knox in the 1940s
- Born: 16 January 1907; Strathroy, Ontario, Canada
- Died: 25 April 1995 (aged 88); Berwick-upon-Tweed, Northumberland, England
- Occupations: Actor; author
- Years active: 1931–1986
- Spouse: Doris Nolan (m. 1944)
- Children: 1

Alexander Knox (16 January 1907 – 25 April 1995) was a Canadian actor and writer. He appeared in over 100 film, television, and theatrical productions over a career spanning from the 1920s until the late 1980s. He was nominated for the Academy Award for Best Actor and won the Golden Globe Award for Best Actor in a Motion Picture – Drama for his performance as Woodrow Wilson in the biopic Wilson (1944). However, his career in the United States was hampered by McCarthyism, and he spent the rest of his career in the United Kingdom.

Knox portrayed Control in the 1979 BBC miniseries adaptation of John le Carre's Tinker Tailor Soldier Spy. He acted in such films as Europe '51, The Vikings, The Longest Day, The Damned, and Modesty Blaise. He often worked with director Joseph Losey, a fellow American blacklistee living in the UK.

Aside from his acting career, Knox was also an author, writing adventure novels set in the Great Lakes area during the 19th century as well as plays and detective novels.

== Life and career ==
Knox was born in Strathroy, Ontario, where his father was the minister of the Presbyterian Church. He graduated from the University of Western Ontario. He moved to Boston, Massachusetts, to perform on stage with the Boston Repertory Theatre. After the company folded following the stock market crash of 1929, Knox returned to London, Ontario, where, for the next two years, he worked as a reporter for The London Advertiser before moving to London, England, where, during the 1930s, he appeared in several films. He also appeared in various roles at the Old Vic such as the Judge in George Bernard Shaw's Geneva. Canadian novelist Robertson Davies described his performance thus: "To this role he brought a dignity which did much to heighten the effect of the famous court-scene which makes up the third act...". In 1939, at the Malvern Festival, he acted in Shaw's In Good King Charles's Golden Days. His own play Old Master was also staged. He starred opposite Jessica Tandy in the 1940 Broadway production of Jupiter Laughs and as Friar Laurence in Romeo and Juliet with Vivien Leigh and Laurence Olivier. Then in 1944, he was chosen by Darryl F. Zanuck to star in Wilson (1944), the biographical film about American President Woodrow Wilson, for which he won a Golden Globe Award and was nominated for the Academy Award for Best Actor. However, during the McCarthy Era, his liberal views and work with the Committee for the First Amendment hurt his career, but he was not blacklisted, and he returned to Britain.

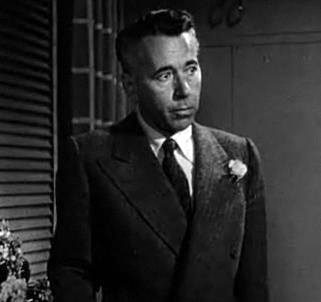
Knox in Paula (1952).

Knox had major roles in The Sea Wolf (1941), None Shall Escape (1944), Over 21 (1945), Sister Kenny (1946), Man In The Saddle (1951), Paula (1952), Europa '51 (1952), and The Vikings (1958), as well as supporting roles late in his career, such as in The Damned (1963), Modesty Blaise (1966), Nicholas and Alexandra (1971), Joshua Then and Now (1985; his last film role) and the miniseries Tinker Tailor Soldier Spy.

He depicted Governor Hudson Inverest in "The Latin Touch", the second episode of the first season of The Saint in 1962.

=== Writing ===
He wrote several adventure novels: Bride of Quietness (1933), Night of the White Bear (1971), The Enemy I Kill (1972; republished as Totem Dream in 1973), Raider's Moon, and The Kidnapped Surgeon. He also wrote plays and at least three detective novels under a pseudonym before 1945.

== Personal life ==
Knox was married to American actress Doris Nolan (1916–1998) from 1944 until his death in 1995. They starred together in the 1949 Broadway play The Closing Door, which Knox also wrote. They had a son Andrew Joseph Knox (born 1947; died by suicide in 1987) who became an actor and appeared in Doctor on the Go, and who was married to Imogen Hassall.

Knox died in Berwick-upon-Tweed from bone cancer on April 25, 1995.

== Complete filmography ==
- The Ringer (1931) (uncredited)
- Rembrandt (1936) as Ludwick's Assistant (uncredited)
- The Tiger (1936 TV movie) as American Liaison Officer
- Everyman (1937 TV movie) as Everyman
- Polly (1937 TV movie) as Cawwawkee
- Deirdre (1938 TV movie) as Naisi
- The Gaunt Stranger (1938) as Dr. Lomond
- The Four Feathers (1939) (uncredited)
- Cheer Boys Cheer (1939) as Saunders
- The Sea Wolf (1941) as Humphrey Van Weyden
- This Above All (1942) as Rector
- Commandos Strike at Dawn (1942) as German Captain
- None Shall Escape (1944) as Wilhelm Grimm
- Wilson (1944) as Woodrow Wilson
- Over 21 (1945) as Max W. Wharton
- Sister Kenny (1946) as Dr. McDonnell
- The Judge Steps Out (1948) as Judge Thomas Bailey
- The Sign of the Ram (1949) as Mallory St. Aubyn
- Tokyo Joe (1949) as Mark Landis
- I'd Climb the Highest Mountain (1951) as Tom Salter
- Two of a Kind (1951) as Vincent Mailer
- Saturday's Hero (1951) as Professor Megroth
- The Son of Dr. Jekyll (1951) as Dr. Curtis Lanyon
- Man in the Saddle (1951) as Will Isham
- Paula (1952) as Dr. Clifford Frazer
- Europa '51 (1952) as George Girard
- The Sleeping Tiger (1954) as Dr. Cilve Esmond
- The Divided Heart (1954) as The Chief Justice
- The Night My Number Came Up (1955) as Owen Robertson
- Alias John Preston (1955) as Dr. Peter Walton
- Reach for the Sky (1956) as Mr. Joyce
- High Tide at Noon (1957) as Stephen MacKenzie
- Hidden Fear (1957) as Hartman
- Davy (1958) as Sir Giles
- Chase a Crooked Shadow (1958) as Chandler Brisson
- The Vikings (1958) as Father Godwin
- Intent to Kill (1958) as Dr. McNeil
- Passionate Summer (1958) as Leonard Pawley
- The Two-Headed Spy (1958) as Gestapo Leader Müller
- Operation Amsterdam (1959) as Walter Keyser
- The Wreck of the Mary Deare (1959) as Petrie
- Oscar Wilde (1960) as Sir Edward Clarke
- Crack in the Mirror (1960) as President
- The Share Out (1962) as Col. Calderwood
- The Longest Day (1962) as Maj. Gen. Walter Bedell Smith
- The Damned (1963) as Bernard
- In the Cool of the Day (1963) as Frederick Bonner
- Man in the Middle (1964) as Col. Burton
- Woman of Straw (1964) as Detective Inspector
- Crack in the World (1965) as Sir Charles Eggerston
- Mister Moses (1965) as Rev. Anderson
- The Psychopath (1966) as Frank Saville
- Modesty Blaise (1966) as Minister
- Khartoum (1966) as Sir Evelyn Baring
- Accident (1967) as University Provost
- The 25th Hour (1967) as D.A.
- Bikini Paradise (1967) as Commissioner Lighton
- You Only Live Twice (1967) as American President (uncredited)
- How I Won the War (1967) as American General
- Villa Rides (1968) as President Madero
- Shalako (1968) as Henry Clarke
- Fräulein Doktor (1969) as Gen. Peronne
- Run a Crooked Mile (1969 TV movie) as Sir Howard Nettleton
- Skullduggery (1970) as Buffington
- When We Dead Awaken (1970 TV movie) as Rubek
- Puppet on a Chain (1971) as Colonel De Graaf
- Nicholas and Alexandra (1971) as The American Ambassador
- Truman at Potsdam (1976 TV movie) as Henry L. Stimson
- Holocaust 2000 (1977) as Meyer
- Churchill and the Generals (1979 TV movie) as Henry Stimson - Secretary of War
- Suez 1956 (1979 TV movie) as John Foster Dulles
- Tinker Tailor Soldier Spy (1979 TV mini-series) as Control - Chief of Circus
- Cry of the Innocent (1980 TV movie) as Thornton Donegin
- Gorky Park (1983) as General
- Helen Keller: The Miracle Continues (1984 TV movie) as Mr. Gilman
- The Last Place on Earth (1985 TV serial as Sir Clements Markham
- Joshua Then and Now (1985) as Senator Hornby

== Selected stage roles ==
- Smoky Cell by Edgar Wallace (1930)
- Jupiter Laughs by A.J. Cronin (1944)
- Return to Tyassi by Benn Levy (1950)

== See also ==
- List of Canadian Academy Award winners and nominees
