= Film Noir Classic Collection =

DVD series

The Film Noir Classic Collection is a DVD collection film noir series released by Warner Home Video. Volume 1 was first released in 2004. Two volumes, 2 and 3, were published in 2006. Volume 5 of the series was published on July 13, 2010.

Several of the films released as part of the collection were released for the first time on DVD, and are rare for film enthusiasts to find. Crime Wave was first released on DVD with Volume 4 of the Film Noir Classic Collection, released in the summer of 2007. On Volume 4, ten films were released for the first time, instead of the five for each of the first three.

== Volumes ==
=== Volume 1 (2004) ===
- The Asphalt Jungle (1950)
- Gun Crazy (1949)
- Murder, My Sweet (1944)
- Out of the Past (1947)
- The Set-Up (1949)

=== Volume 2 (2006) ===
- Born to Kill (1947)
- Clash by Night (1952)
- Crossfire (1947)
- Dillinger (1945)
- The Narrow Margin (1952)

=== Volume 3 (2006) ===
- Border Incident (1949)
- His Kind of Woman (1949)
- Lady in the Lake (1947)
- On Dangerous Ground (1951)
- The Racket (1951)

=== Volume 4 (2007) ===
- Act of Violence (1948)
- The Big Steal (1949)
- Crime Wave (1954)
- Decoy (1946)
- Illegal (1955)
- Mystery Street (1950)
- Side Street (1950)
- Tension (1949)
- They Live by Night (1948)
- Where Danger Lives (1950)

=== Volume 5 (2010) ===
- Armored Car Robbery (1950)
- Backfire (1950)
- Cornered (1945)
- Crime in the Streets (1946)
- Deadline at Dawn (1946)
- Desperate (1946)
- Dial 1119 (1950)
- The Phenix City Story (1955)
