= Thunderhoof (film) =

1948 film by Phil Karlson

- Directed by: Phil Karlson
- Screenplay by: Harold Jacob Smith; Kenneth Gamet
- Based on: White Silence; 1900 story in The Son of the Wolf: Tales of the Far North by Jack London
- Produced by: Ted Richmond
- Starring: Preston Foster; Mary Stuart; William Bishop
- Cinematography: Henry Freulich
- Edited by: Jerome Thoms
- Production company: Columbia Pictures
- Distributed by: Columbia Pictures
- Release date: July 8, 1948
- Running time: 76 minutes
- Country: United States
- Language: English

Thunderhoof is a 1948 American Western film directed by Phil Karlson and starring Preston Foster, Mary Stuart and William Bishop. The film's sets were designed by the art director Walter Holscher.

== Plot ==
Texas rancher Scotty Mason goes into the Mexican desert-country in search of a wild horse, and takes his young wife, Margarita and his hired-hand, The Kid, whose life Scotty had saved a few years earlier. The Kid falls in love with Magarita before they have crossed the Texas border, and spends more time plotting to get rid of Scotty than he does horse-hunting. Before long the two are engaged in fisticuffs in a mountain pass, but Scotty spots the horse he is hunting (Thunderhoof) and the chase is on. Scotty breaks his leg in the capture and, with a makeshift splint, Scotty, the Kid, Margarita and the horse start the return trek to Texas. Scotty and the Kid get into another fight, in a blinding sand-storm, and the Kid tosses Scott in a ravine, and tells Margarita that Scotty has deserted them. She joins the Kid, and learns the truth about Scotty after the delirious Kid drinks from a poisoned-water hole.

== Cast ==
- Preston Foster as Scotty Mason
- Mary Stuart as Margarita
- William Bishop as The Kid
- Dice as Thunderhoof

== Bibliography ==
- Gene Freese. Jock Mahoney: The Life and Films of a Hollywood Stuntman. McFarland, 2013.
