= Gordon Persons =

43rd Governor of Alabama (1951–1955)

Seth Gordon Persons
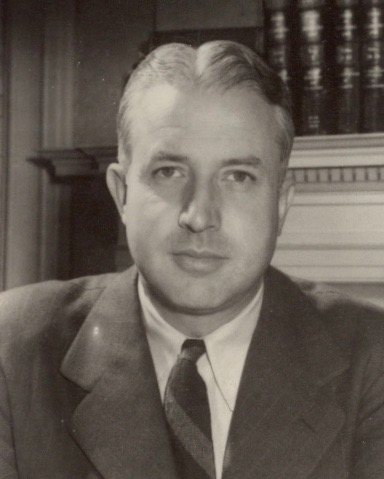
- Official campaign portrait, 1950

43rd Governor of Alabama
- In office January 15, 1951 – January 17, 1955
- Lieutenant: James Allen
- Preceded by: Jim Folsom
- Succeeded by: Jim Folsom

Personal details
- Born: February 5, 1902 Montgomery, Alabama, U.S.
- Died: May 29, 1965 (aged 63) Montgomery, Alabama, U.S.
- Resting place: Greenwood Cemetery (Montgomery, Alabama)
- Party: Democratic
- Education: Auburn University

Seth Gordon Persons (February 5, 1902 – May 29, 1965) was an American Democratic politician who was the 43rd governor of Alabama from 1951 to 1955. A relative moderate, Persons provided reforms to the state prison system, and limited poll tax reform, while expanding highway spending and creating the state's educational television system. His term was relatively quiet, between the Dixiecrat revolt and the eve of the turbulent civil rights era.

== Early life and career ==
Persons enrolled at Auburn University in 1921. While at Auburn, he served as president of the "Hobo Club" that traveled to away football games dressed as hobos. Persons studied electrical engineering, but left school after one year.

Persons held various jobs, working for the Farm Bureau and for IBM in Ithaca, New York, before returning to Montgomery to run a service station and open a radio parts store. In 1930, he and partner Howard Pill founded WSFA, Montgomery's first radio station. Persons would go on to serve on the board of directors for the National Association of Broadcasters from 1935 to 1939, and as the chief radio consultant of the Office of War Information from 1942 to 1943.

In 1935, Persons was appointed by governor Bibb Graves as chairman of the state Rural Electrification Administration. Three years later, he opened his own engineering firm installing electrical lines; in addition to financial gain, he also won considerable popularity. After an unsuccessful run for the presidency of the Alabama Public Service Commission in 1940, he won election as an associate commissioner in 1942, and as president in 1944. He unsuccessfully campaigned for Governor in 1946, finishing last in the five-candidate Democratic primary.

== Governor of Alabama ==
=== 1950 election ===
Persons ran for Governor again in 1950, seeking to avoid conflict between the white supremacist Dixiecrat loyalists and the national Democratic party. While campaigning, Persons gained notoriety by touring the state in a two-seat helicopter, prompting one opponent to dub him "the man from Mars". He won the Democratic nomination by defeating a crowded field that included former governor Chauncey Sparks. Owing to Democratic dominance of state politics, Persons was elected in November 1950 with nearly 91% of the vote.

=== Tenure ===
Persons sought to counter the bombastic nature of his predecessor and successor, Jim Folsom, with a no-nonsense, business-like approach. He declined an inaugural parade and ball, and took the oath of office in a simple business suit, rather than a formal top hat and coat. Persons and his family were the first to occupy the current Alabama Governor's Mansion. His first official act as governor was to call a meeting of the Auburn University board of trustees to fire football coach Earl Brown and replace him with Shug Jordan.

Owing to good relations with the Legislature, Persons was able to institute a sweeping agenda. He reformed the prison system, placing it under a new supervisory board and ending fiscal mismanagement, and abolishing corporal punishment, deriding it as barbaric. He increased spending on highway construction, and imposed a 60 mile-per-hour speed limit, significantly reducing traffic fatalities. In 1953, Alabama created the Educational Television Commission (the predecessor of Alabama Public Television), becoming the first state in the nation to do so.

Persons also signed "right-to-work" legislation that limited union activity, and established new voting qualifications aimed at restricting African Americans. In the midst of McCarthyism, he also barred Communists from holding public office, and required them to register their party membership. Although he had campaigned on abolishing the poll tax, he compromised with the legislature on limiting unpaid poll taxes and eliminating them for older voters. Near the end of his term, the U.S. Supreme Court struck down segregation in schools in the Brown v. Board of Education ruling. Persons refused to convene a special session of the legislature, which would seek to maintain segregation.

In July 1954, Persons ordered the National Guard into Phenix City after the assassination of Attorney General-elect Albert Patterson.

Unable to run for a second consecutive term, Persons suffered a heart attack in November 1954, days before Folsom's re-election. He never returned to office, and directed his secretary to read his farewell address to the legislature.

== Post-Governorship and death ==
After leaving office as governor, Persons never sought statewide public office again. He was considered a frontrunner for the 1958 Alabama gubernatorial election, but a stroke prevented him from running. He died after another stroke on May 29, 1965.

== Legacy ==
The Dauphin Island Bridge south of Mobile is formally named for him. The Gordon Persons Building is a six floor, 60,000 square foot state government office building in Montgomery that houses the state departments of Education, Revenue, and Human Resources.

Party political offices
Preceded by Jim Folsom	Democratic nominee for Governor of Alabama; 1950	Succeeded by Jim Folsom
Political offices
Preceded by Jim Folsom	Governor of Alabama; 1951–1955	Succeeded by Jim Folsom
