= Albert Patterson =

American politician

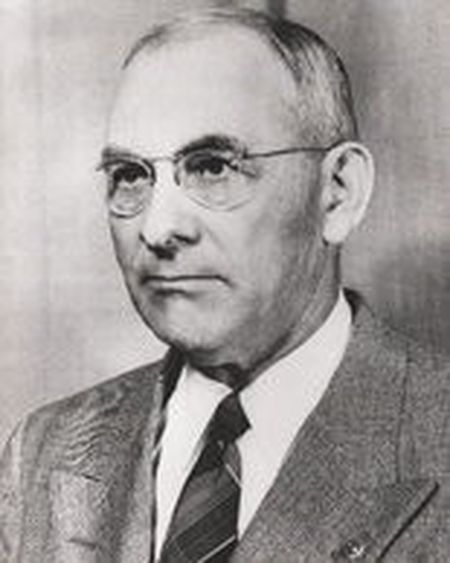

Alabama state senator
- In office 1947–1951

Personal details
- Born: Albert Love Patterson; January 27, 1894 New Site, Alabama, U.S.
- Died: June 18, 1954 (aged 60) Phenix City, Alabama, U.S.
- Cause of death: Assassination
- Party: Democratic
- Other political affiliations: Russell Betterment Association (RBA)
- Spouse: Agnes Benson
- Education: University of Alabama Cumberland University
- Occupation: Attorney
- Known for: Anti-corruption activist, murdered Attorney General elect

Military service
- Branch/service: Texas Army National Guard
- Rank: Second lieutenant
- Battles/wars: World War 1
- Awards: Croix de Guerre

Albert Love Patterson (January 27, 1894 – June 18, 1954) was an American politician and attorney in Phenix City, Alabama. He was assassinated outside his law office shortly after he had won the Democratic nomination for Alabama Attorney General on a platform of reforming the rife corruption and vice in Phenix City.

== Early life ==
Albert Love Patterson was born in the New Site community in Tallapoosa County sometime between 1891 and 1897, depending on what source is used. According to his driver's license at the time of his death, his date of birth was January 27, 1894. He was the son of Mary Green (Sorrell) and Delona Patterson, and grew up on a farm with seven siblings. He left Alabama as a teenager to seek a better life. He eventually settled in East Texas, working as a day laborer on farms and oil fields.

In Texas, Patterson joined the Third Texas Infantry, earning a commission as a second lieutenant. He began dating Agnes Benson of Colbert County, Ala., and they married on July 14, 1917. In July 1918, Patterson deployed to France as an officer with the 36th Infantry Division. In France, Patterson was seriously wounded near Saint-Étienne-à-Arnes. For his service, France awarded him the Croix de Guerre with a silver gilt star.

Patterson spent a lengthy convalescence after he was discharged before he returned to his native Alabama to attend college. He earned a teacher's certificate from what is now Jacksonville State University in 1921 and served as a high school principal in both Clay County and Coosa County. He completed his bachelor's degree in history from the University of Alabama in 1926, graduating Phi Beta Kappa. He would go on to earn his law degree in just one year from Cumberland University's law school in Lebanon, Tennessee. After he opened law practices in Opelika and Alexander City, he would settle in Phenix City in 1933.

== Political career ==
Patterson began his political career in 1937 as a member of the Phenix City Board of Education. By 1940, he was also chairman of the Russell County Draft Board. In 1946, he was elected to the Alabama State Senate, where he served from 1947 to 1951 and helped introduce several important bills, including the Wallace-Cater Act, which allowed the use of state and municipal bonds to finance industrial plants, and the Trade School Act, which formed many of Alabama's trade schools.

In the early 1950s, Patterson became involved with the Russell Betterment Association (RBA), which was formed to combat the rampant vice and corruption occurring in Phenix City and Russell County. That involvement resulted in Patterson's office being set ablaze in 1952. The RBA had been thwarted electing its candidates at the local level and so it decided to nominate candidates for statewide office. Since Patterson had held a Senate seat, he was seen as the perfect candidate for the office of attorney general.

He obtained a plurality in the 1954 Democratic primary and staged a runoff in May with Lee "Red" Porter of Gadsden. In the runoff, early election results saw Patterson gain a seemingly-insurmountable lead. That allegedly led Porter's Phenix City supporters to buy and to steal votes throughout the state to attempt to keep Patterson from victory. The results continued going back and forth until June 10, when the executive committee of the Alabama Democratic Party declared Patterson as the winner.

== Assassination ==
On the evening of June 18, 1954, Patterson was working in his law office in the Coulter Building in Phenix City. As he left at about 9 p.m., he walked to his car, which was parked in an alley off Fifth Avenue next to the Elite Cafe. An unidentified assailant walked up to him, pushed a gun in his mouth, and shot him three times. One cartridge was found wedged in an opening, where two or three front teeth had been knocked out. Patterson was well aware that his life was in danger, commenting just one night earlier to a church group, "I have only a 100-to-1 chance of ever being sworn in as attorney general."

== Aftermath and legacy ==
Reaction from the state was swift. Within weeks, Governor Gordon Persons declared martial law in the city, effectively giving the Alabama National Guard the law enforcement duties in the city and the county. The state sent special prosecutors from Montgomery to replace the local judiciary.

Within six months, the Phenix City machine was dismantled. A special grand jury in Birmingham handed down 734 indictments against local law enforcement officers, elected officials, and local business owners connected to organized crime. Three officials were specifically indicted for Patterson's murder: Chief Deputy Sheriff Albert Fuller, Circuit Solicitor Arch Ferrell, and Attorney General Si Garrett. Of the three, only Fuller was convicted; he was sentenced to life imprisonment but was released after 10 years. Fuller died within the same year from injuries sustained in a fall and claimed his innocence until his dying day. Ferrell was acquitted and Garrett was never brought to trial, as he was convalescing in a mental institution for most of the year after Patterson's murder.

Patterson's son, John Malcolm Patterson, assumed the Democratic nomination for attorney general; he won and took office in 1955. In 1958, John Patterson was elected as Alabama governor, running on a platform of fighting organized crime and public corruption.

== Honors and awards ==
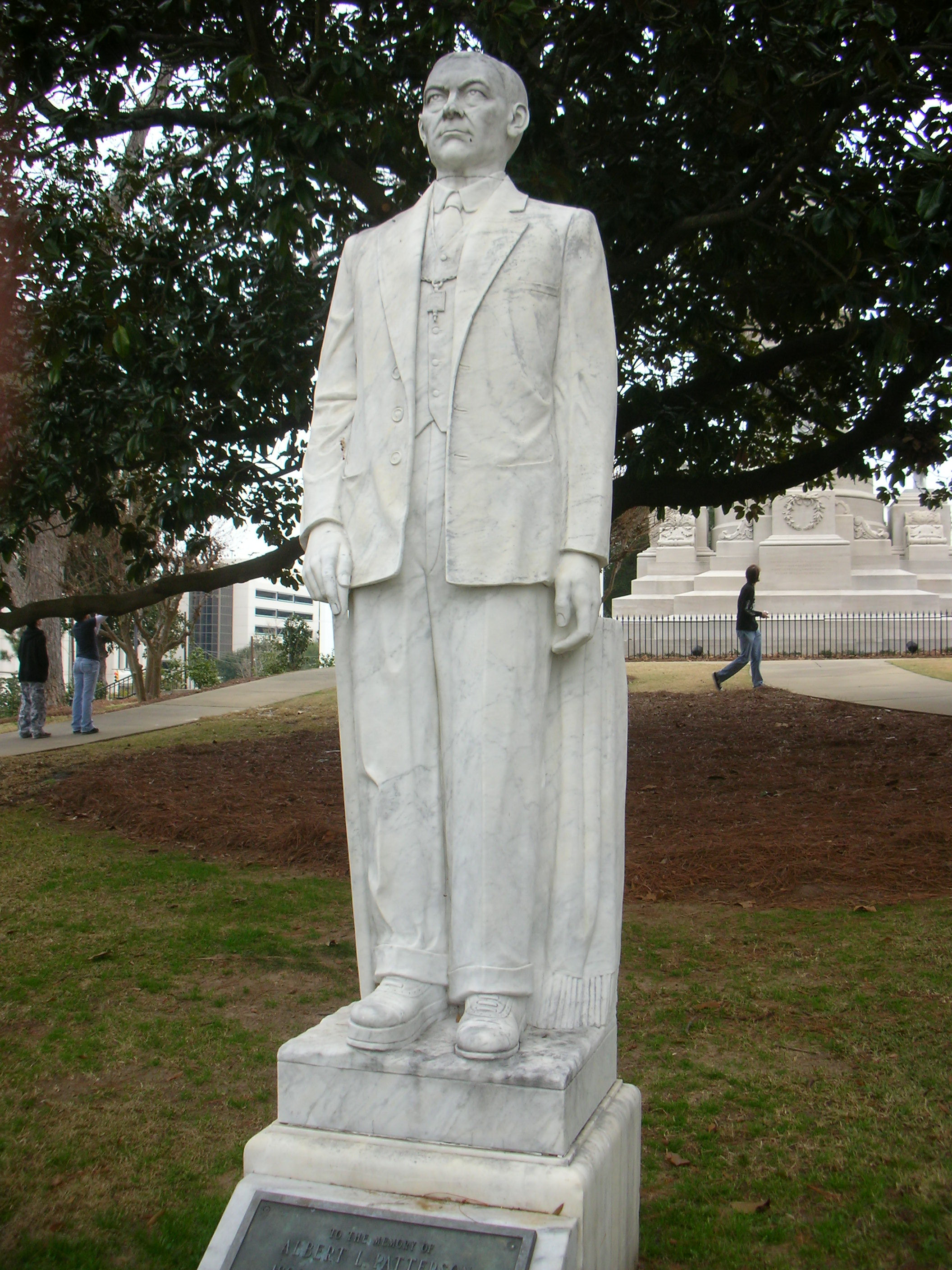
Statue in memory of Albert Patterson, on the grounds of the Alabama State Capitol building, Montgomery, Alabama

- Croix de Guerre.
- A memorial statue of Patterson stands on the grounds of the Alabama State Capitol in Montgomery.

== See also ==
- List of assassinated American politicians
- Organized crime
- Corruption
- Hugh A. Bentley – founded the Russell Betterment Association
- Propaganda Due – Criminal organization with a structure similar to corruption in Phenix City.
- 1954 Guatemalan coup d'état - Event that started the same day Patterson was assassinated.
