= Roods Landing site =

Archaeological site in Georgia, US

Roods Landing Site
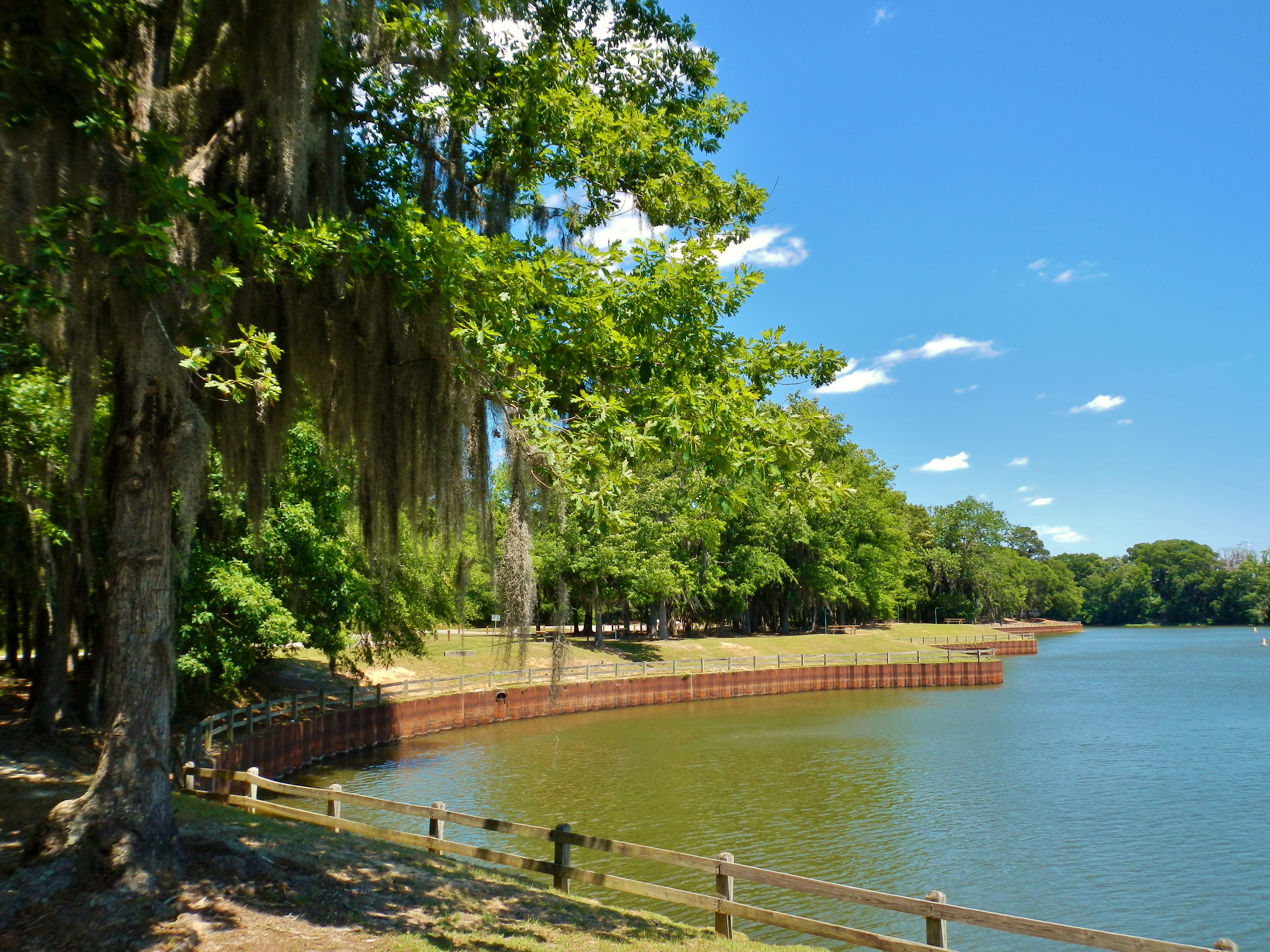
- Roods Creek Landing Recreation Area, location of the Roods Creek Mounds.

- Location within Georgia Location within the United States
- 32°1′28.02″N 85°2′39.98″W
- Cultures: Middle Woodland, South Appalachian Mississippian culture
- Location: Omaha, Georgia, United States
- Region: Stewart County, Georgia

Site notes
- Architectural style: platform mound Number of temples:
- Roods Landing Site
- U.S. National Register of Historic Places
- Area: 100 acres (40.5 ha)
- NRHP reference No.: 75000609
- Added to NRHP: August 19, 1975

The Roods Landing Site or Roods Creek Mounds (9SW1) is an archaeological site located south of Omaha, Stewart County, Georgia, United States at the confluence of Rood Creek and the Chattahoochee River. It is a Middle Woodland / Mississippian period Pre-Columbian complex of earthen mounds. It was entered on the National Register of Historic Places on August 19, 1975.

== Site description ==
The location is a large multimound site with eight platform mounds. The largest mound at the site is Mound A, at 7.6 metres (25 ft) in height, with a base, and summit measuring 44.2 metres (145 ft) by 38.1 metres (125 ft). This summit had 3 wattle and daub structures and was covered with a surface of yellow clay with a raised 60-to-90-centimetre (2.0 to 3.0 ft) lip forming a parapet around the edge of the summit. Structure 1 was located at the center of the summit and the other structures were arranged around it to either side. The mound had two ramps leading from the summit (with openings in the clay parapet structure) to the ground level, each measuring 15.2 metres (50 ft) in length, 4.5 metres (15 ft) in width where they join the summit, and 7.6 metres (25 ft) where they meet ground level. One faced northwest on a plaza opposite Mound E, the other lead to the southwest.

== Excavations ==
Clarence Bloomfield Moore attempted to excavate the site. It reminded him of Moundville which it somewhat resembles. However, he was denied permission. The site was excavated in 1955 by Joseph Caldwell but has not been excavated since.

It is considered a major site with multiple mounds and is accessible only through scheduled tours.

== See also ==
- Cayson Mound and Village Site
- Yon Mound and Village Site
- Fort Walton culture
- List of Mississippian sites
