= Cayson Mound and Village Site =

Archaeological site in Florida, US

- Location within Florida
- 30°25′51″N 85°01′34″W
- Cultures: Fort Walton Culture,
- Location: Blountstown, Florida, Calhoun County, Florida, USA
- Region: Calhoun County, Florida

History
- Built: 1200 CE

Site notes
- Architectural style: platform mound
- Cayson Mound and Village Site
- U.S. National Register of Historic Places
- NRHP reference No.: 76000587
- Added to NRHP: 15 March 1976

The Cayson Mound and Village Site (8CA3) is a prehistoric archaeological site located near Blountstown, Florida. It is located three miles southeast of Blountstown, on the Apalachicola River. The site was occupied by peoples of the Fort Walton Culture (a regional variation of the Mississippian culture). On March 15, 1976, it was added to the U.S. National Register of Historic Places.

== See also ==
- Roods Landing site
- Yon Mound and Village Site
- Leon-Jefferson culture
- List of Mississippian sites
