= Yon Mound and Village Site =

Archaeological site in Florida, United States

- Location within Florida
- 30°25′55.99″N 85°0′59.00″W
- Cultures: Fort Walton Culture,
- Location: Bristol, Florida, Liberty County, Florida, United States
- Region: Liberty County, Florida

History
- Built: 1200 CE

Site notes
- Architectural styles: platform mound Number of temples:
- Yon Mound and Village Site
- U.S. National Register of Historic Places
- NRHP reference No.: 78000952
- Added to NRHP: December 15, 1978
- Archaeologists: Clarence Bloomfield Moore

The Yon Mound and Village Site (8LI2) is a prehistoric archaeological site located two miles west of Bristol, Florida on the east bank of the Apalachicola River. The site was occupied by peoples of the Fort Walton Culture (a regional variation of the Mississippian culture). On December 15, 1978, it was added to the U.S. National Register of Historic Places as reference number 78000952.

== Site description ==
Located in the middle Apalachicola River valley of northwest Florida, the site was first occupied briefly during the Swift Creek period at approximately 320 CE. About 1200 CE peoples of the Middle Fort Walton period began occupying the site with the construction of platform mound and associated village site. These people are thought to have been connected with the Cayson Mound and Village Site. The site was later occupied during the protohistoric period by Lamar phase peoples who migrated down the lower Chattahoochee-Apalachicola River, possibly in the wake of initial European contact in the early 16th century.

It was first recorded and excavated by Clarence Bloomfield Moore in the early 20th century.

== See also ==
- Leon-Jefferson culture
- Velda Mound
- List of Mississippian sites
