= Florence Marina State Park =

State park in Georgia, United States

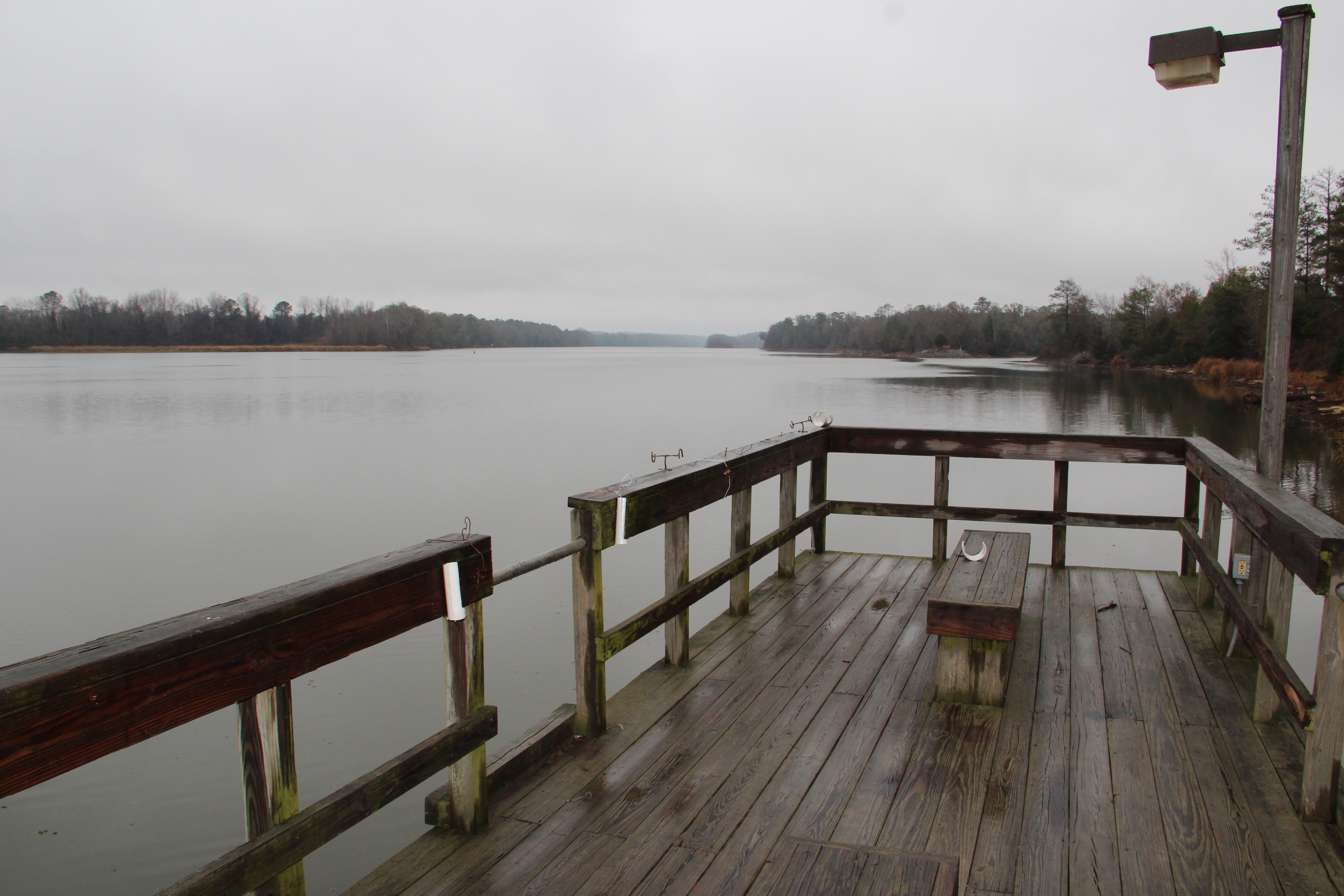
- Florence Marina State Park

- Location within Georgia Location within the United States
- Location: Stewart County, Georgia, USA
- Nearest city: Omaha, Georgia
- Coordinates: 32.0908°N 85.04333°W
- Area: 173 acres (0.70 km^{2}; 0.27 sq mi)
- Governing body: Georgia State Park

Florence Marina State Park is a 173-acre (70 ha) Georgia state park located near Omaha on the eastern shore of Walter F. George Lake. The park is known for its deep-water marina and its water recreation sports, such as fishing and waterskiing. The park also attracts bird-watchers with the chance of seeing herons, egrets and, possibly, bald eagles. The park is home to the Kirbo Interpretive Center, which teaches visitors about Native Americans and displays snakes, turtles, fish, and other artifacts from prehistoric times to the early 20th century. Located just 10 miles (16 km) southeast of the park is Providence Canyon State Outdoor Recreation Area.

== History ==
The park is on the site of the frontier town of Florence, which was originally named Liverpool, after the English port city. Florence was a prosperous town with a covered bridge linking it to Alabama, a newspaper, bank and hotel. The town went into decline after a flood washed away the bridge in 1846 and the town was bypassed by the railroad. Florence was officially incorporated as a town from 1837 until 1995.

== Facilities ==
- 39 Tent/Trailer/RV Campsites
- 7 Cottages
- 8 Efficiency Units
- 2 Playgrounds
- 1 Group Shelter
- 1 Picnic Shelter
- Tennis Courts

== Annual events ==
- Christmas on the Lake (December)
- Easter Egg Hunt (Easter)

== Gallery ==
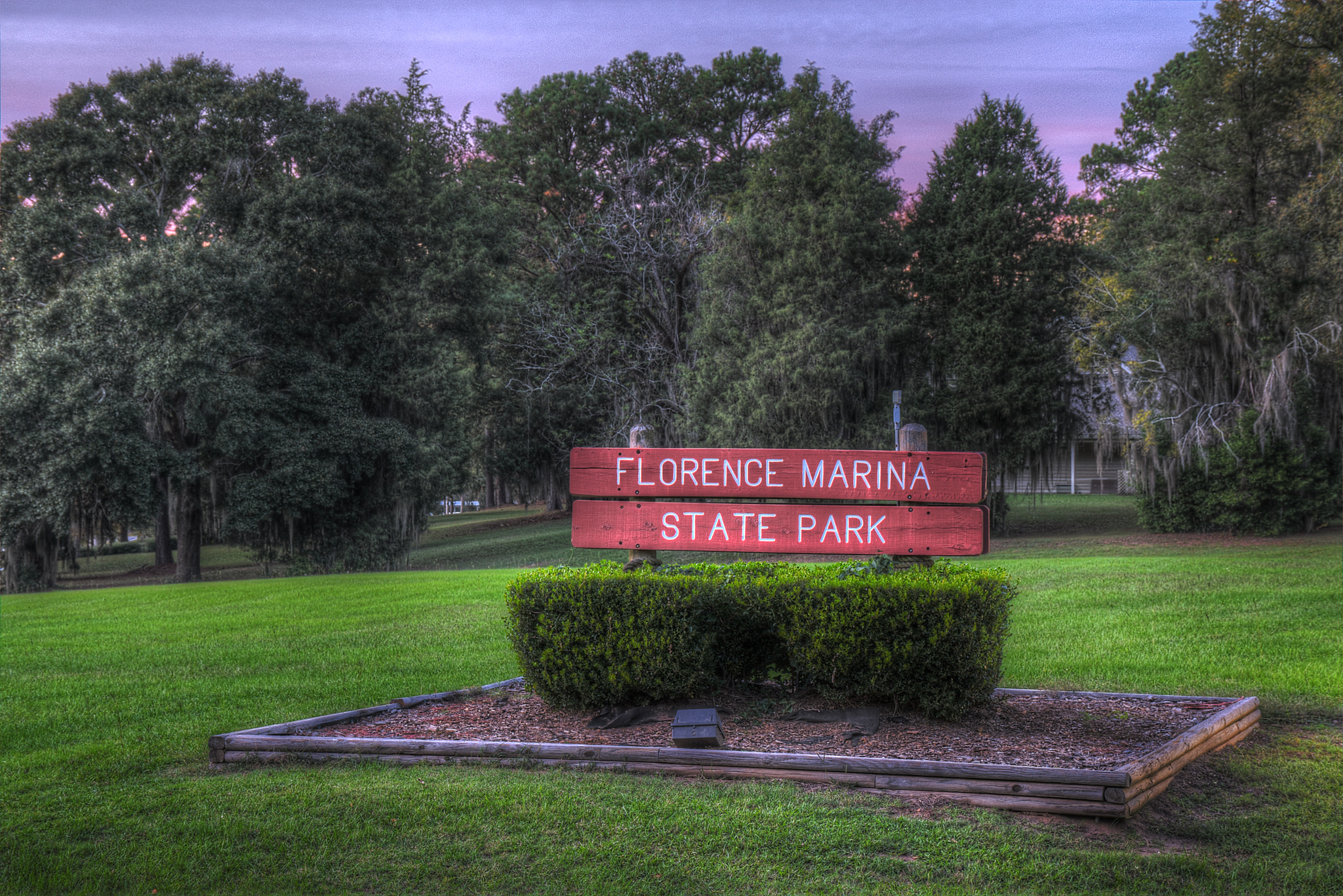
entrance sign

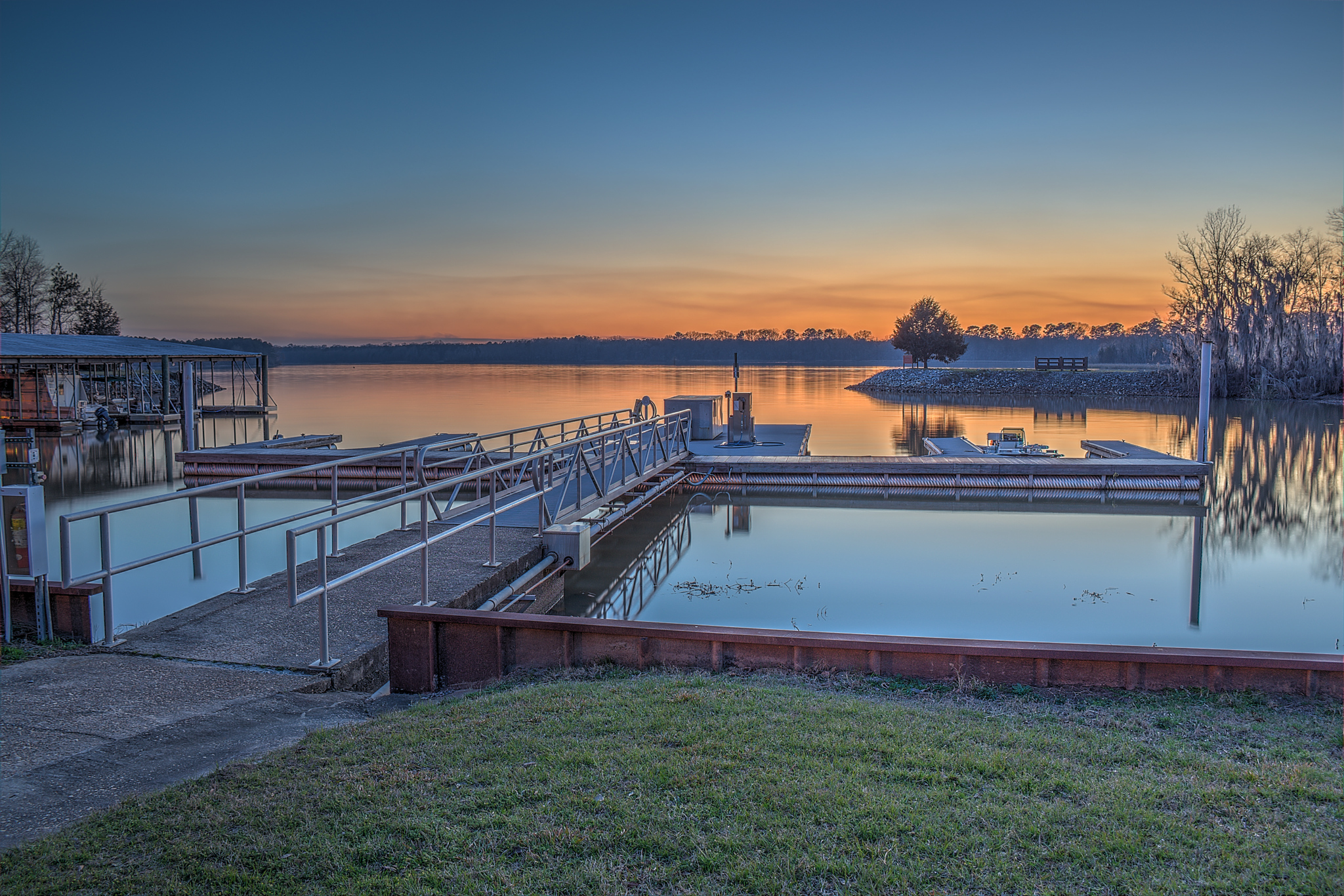
Gas Dock

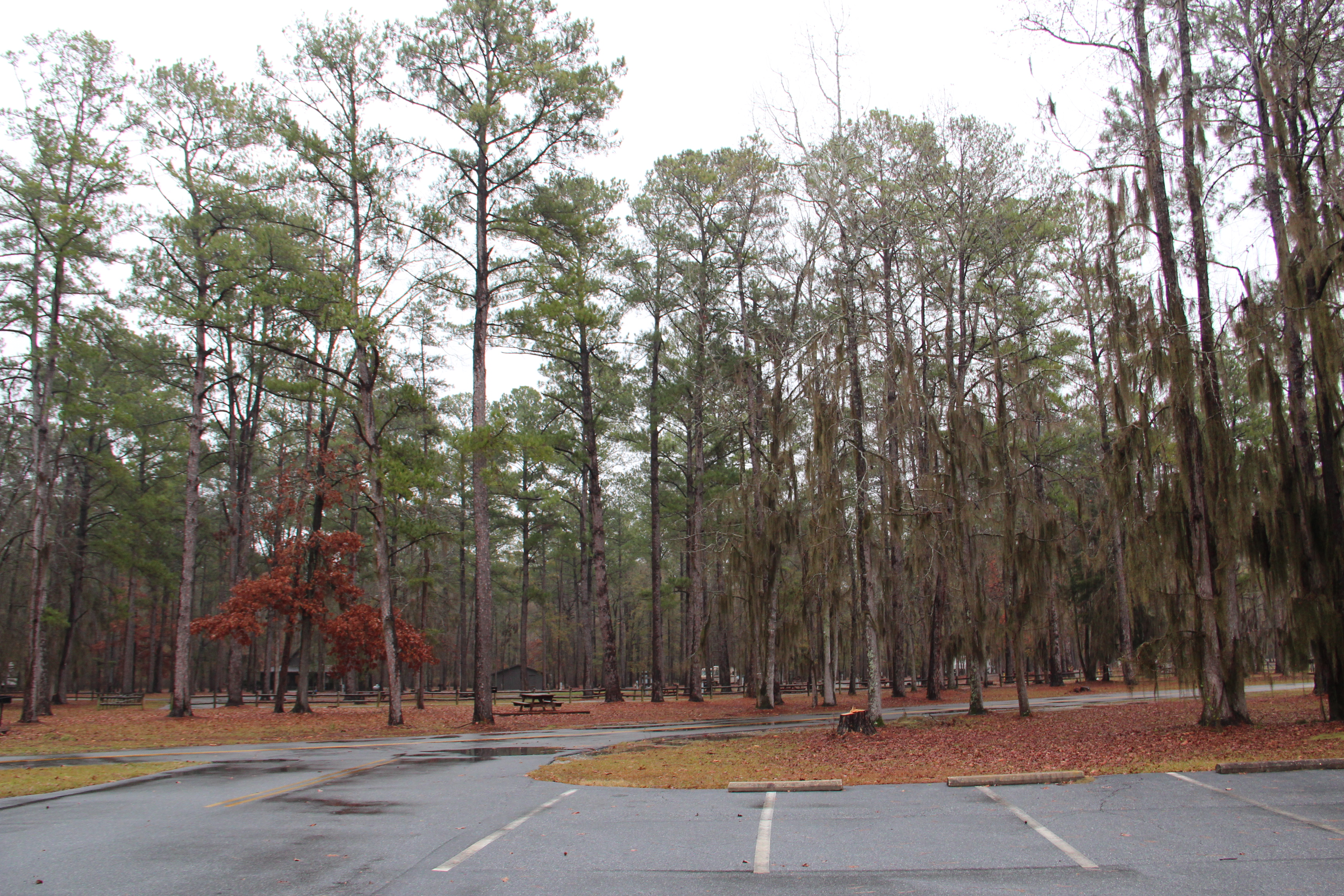
Camping Area

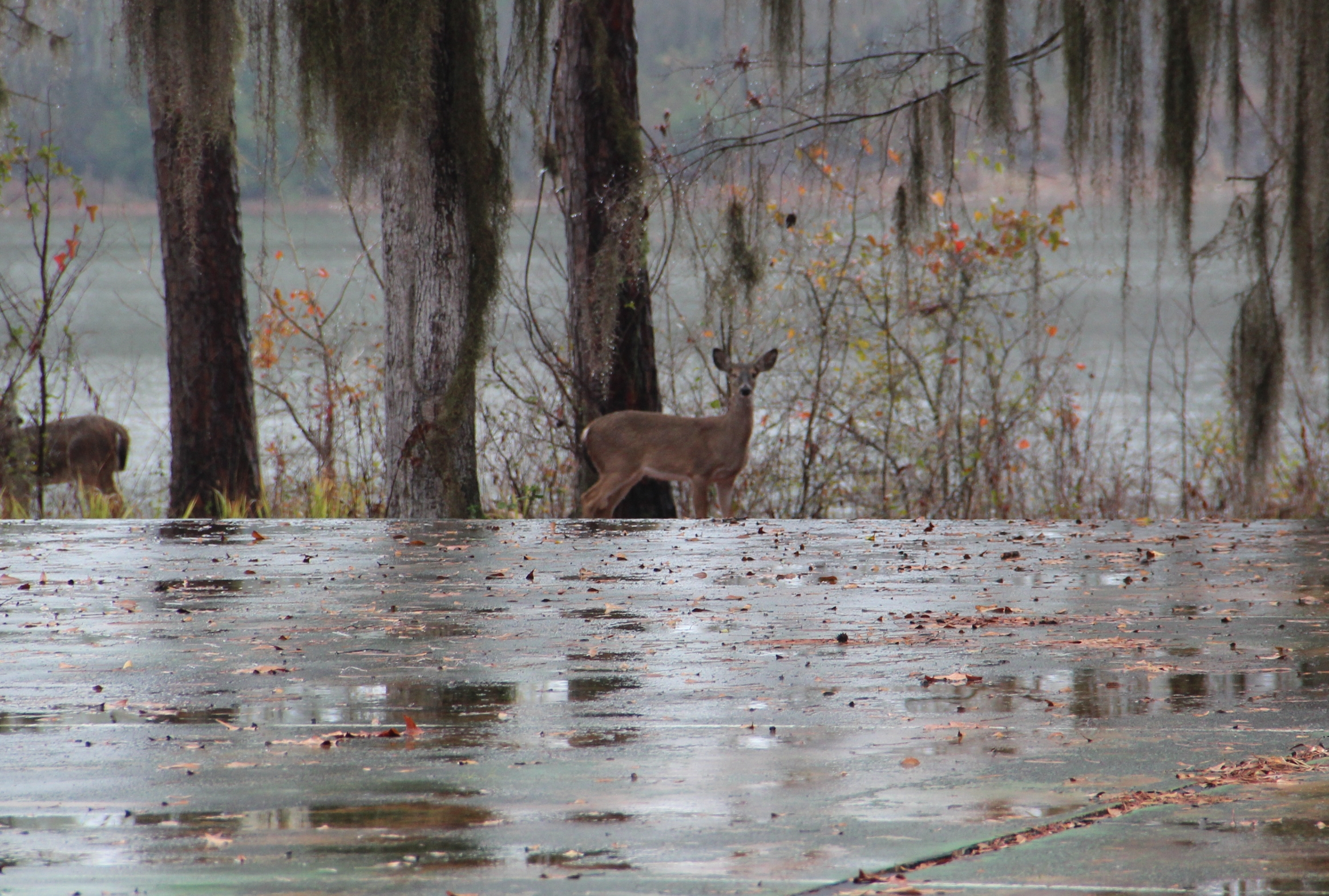
White-tailed deer in the park

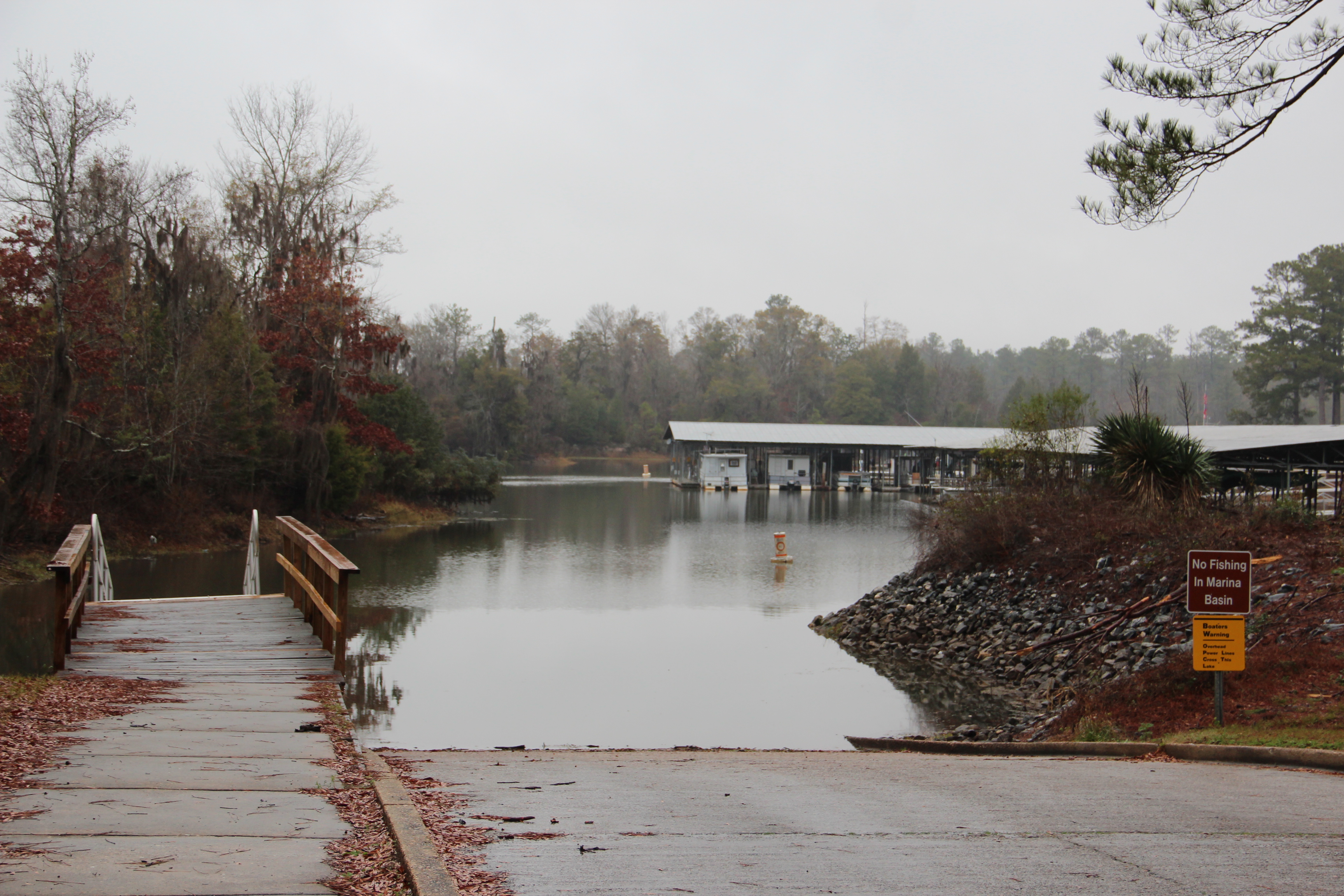
The marina

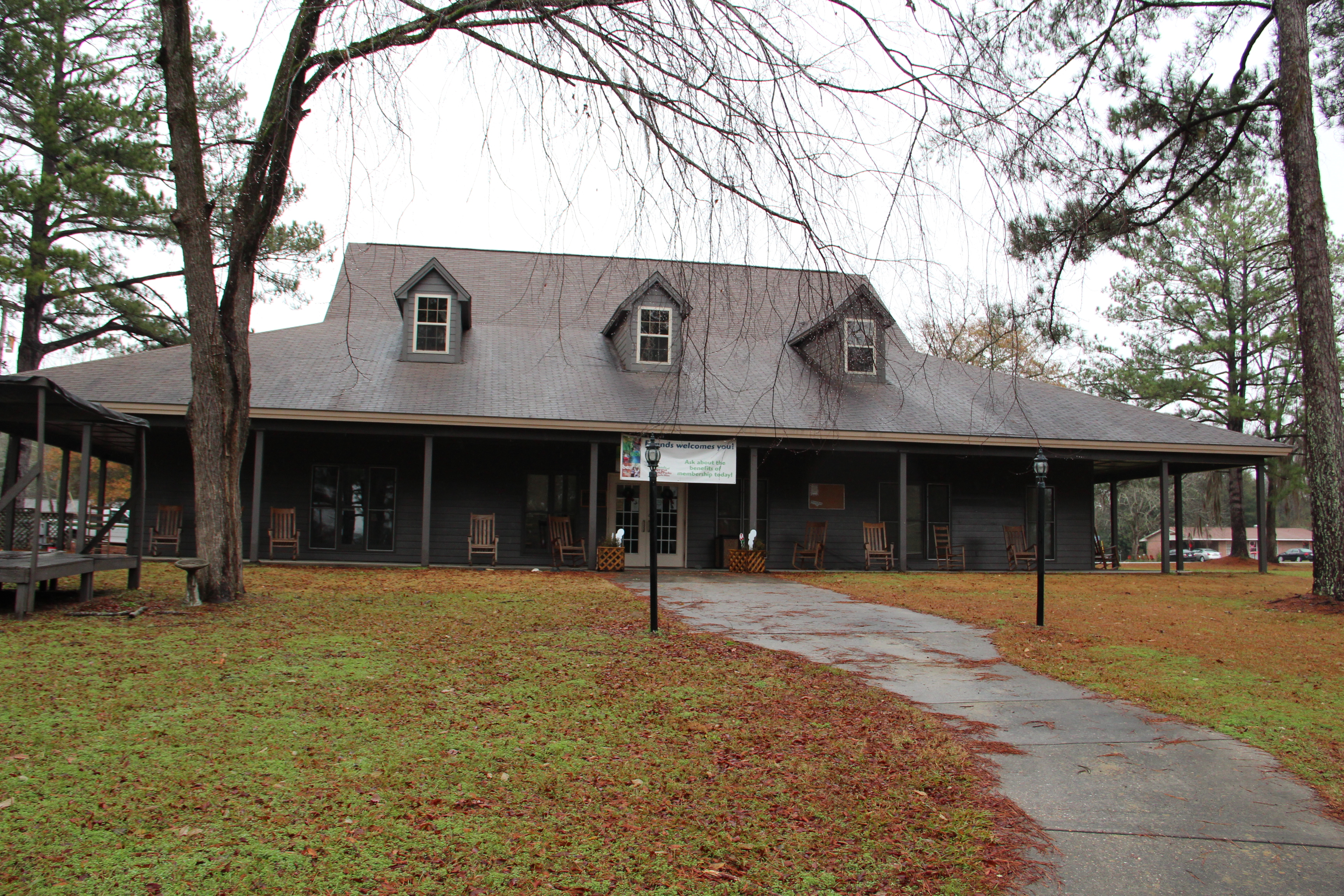
Kirbo Interpretive Center
