= Sanford, Georgia =

Unincorporated community in Georgia, U.S.

Coordinates: 31°58′46.57″N 84°56′36.74″W

Sanford is an unincorporated community in Stewart County, in the U.S. state of Georgia.

== History ==
A post office called Sanford was established in 1892, and remained in operation until 1905. The community most likely was named after John W. A. Sanford, a United States Congressional Representative from the state of Georgia.
