= Stewart County, Georgia =

County in Georgia, United States

- County
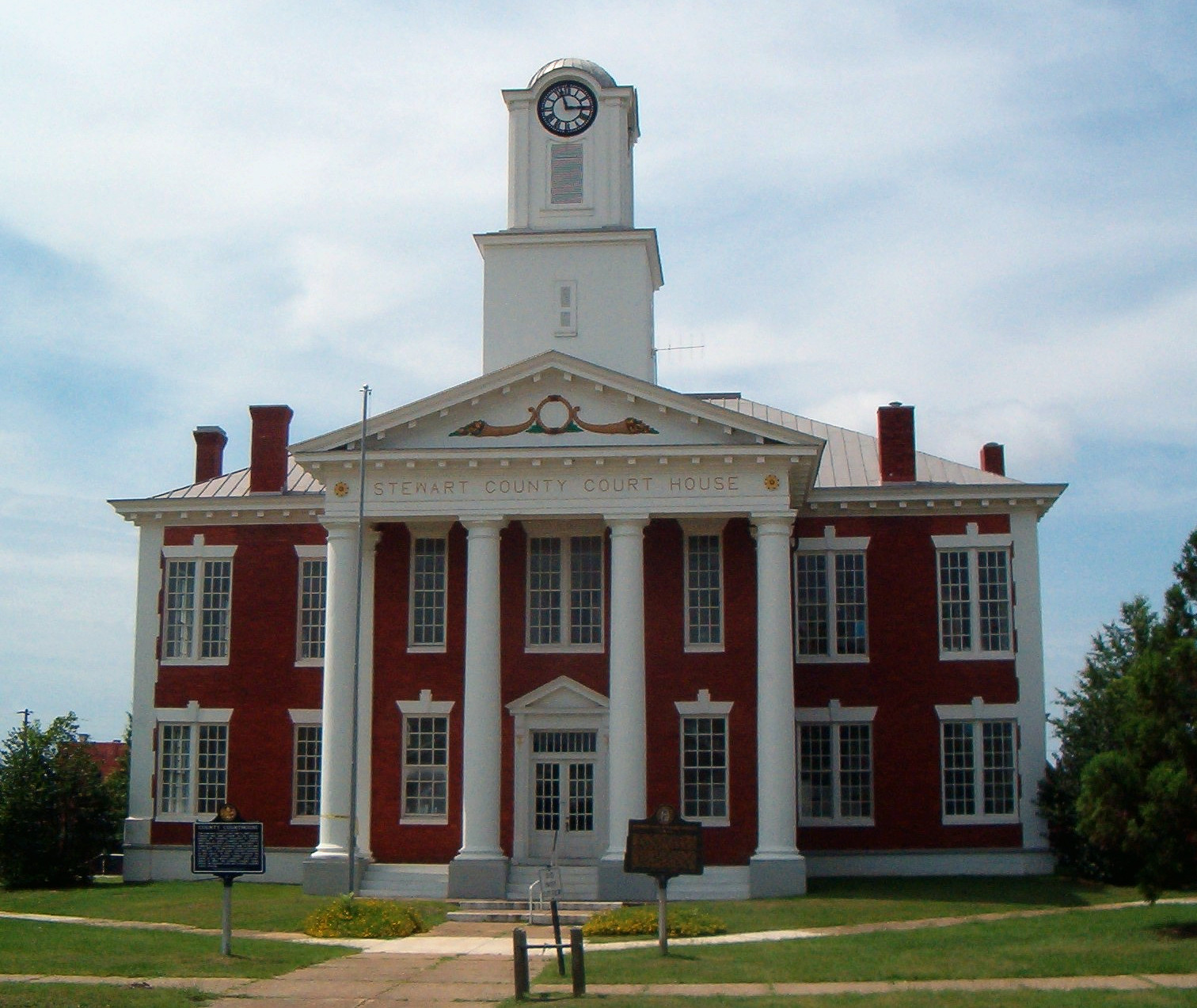
- Stewart County courthouse in Lumpkin

- Location within the U.S. state of Georgia
- Coordinates: 32°05′N 84°50′W
- Country: United States
- State: Georgia
- Founded: December 23, 1830; 195 years ago
- Named for: Daniel Stewart
- Seat: Lumpkin
- Largest city: Richland

Area
  - Total: 464 sq mi (1,200 km^{2})
  - Land: 459 sq mi (1,190 km^{2})
  - Water: 4.9 sq mi (13 km^{2}) 1.1%

Population (2020)
  - Total: 5,314
  - Estimate (2025): 4,631 ▼
  - Density: 11.6/sq mi (4.47/km^{2})
- Time zone: UTC−5 (Eastern)
  - Summer (DST): UTC−4 (EDT)
- Congressional district: 2nd
- Website: stewartcountyga.gov

Stewart County is a county located in the west central portion of the U.S. state of Georgia. As of the 2020 census, the population was 5,314. The county seat is Lumpkin. The county was created on December 23, 1830.

== History ==
The area was inhabited by Native Americans for thousands of years in the Pre-Columbian period. Roods Landing site on the Chattahoochee River is a significant archaeological site located south of Omaha. Listed on the National Register of Historic Places, it includes major earthwork mounds built about 1100–1350 CE by peoples of the sophisticated Mississippian culture. Another Mississippian site is the Singer Moye Mounds, located in the southern part of the county.

The first Europeans to encounter the Native Americans were Spanish explorers in the mid-16th century. At that time the historical Creek tribe inhabited the southern two thirds of what is now defined as Georgia, west of the Low Country. they are believed to be the descendants of the Mississippian culture.

They maintained their territory until after European American settlers arrived in increasing number in the early decades of the 19th century. The ensuing conflicts ultimately resulted in most of the Creek people's being driven out of the region. In the 1830s under Indian removal, the US federal government forced most Creek to relocate west of the Mississippi River, to Indian Territory in what became present-day Oklahoma.

Stewart County was created by an act of the Georgia General Assembly on December 23, 1830, from land that had been part of Randolph County, Georgia. The county is named for Daniel Stewart, a Revolutionary War veteran, and fighter against American Indians. He was one of the four great-grandfathers of U.S. president Theodore Roosevelt.

Settlers developed the area as large cotton plantations, part of the "Black Belt" of Georgia and the Deep South. Before the American Civil War, planters depended on enslaved labor of thousands of African Americans to cultivate and process the cotton for market. Mostly born in the United States, the slaves were transported from the Upper South, with many families broken up when some members were purchased through sales in the domestic slave trade.

In 1850, the county reached its peak in wealth as one of the largest cotton producers in the state. It had the tenth-largest population of any county in the state, with 16,027 people. African-American slaves numbered 7,373, or 46% of the population.

By 1860, the county population was 13,422. The apparent drop was due to the counties of Kinchafoonee (later Webster County) and Quitman being created from Stewart County territory in 1853 and 1858, respectively. There were 5,534 slaves in the redefined Stewart County, constituting more than one-third of the population.

After the war and emancipation, cotton continued as the major commodity crop and additional territory was developed by planters for cultivation. Many freedmen became sharecroppers and tenant farmers in the area, which was agricultural for decades, but in decline. Stewart County lost its premier position when it was bypassed by developing railroads, which went to the north and south. It did not have railroad access until 1885.

Inappropriate farming practices and over-cultivation of cotton from before the Civil War led to extensive land erosion by the early 20th century. Together with mechanization of agriculture and damage due to infestation by the boll weevil, there were losses in this part of the economy. Population declined. Up to the mid century, many blacks left the area in two waves of the Great Migration, seeking escape from Jim Crow conditions, and jobs and better lives in northern and midwestern industrial cities. Farmers shifted to cultivating peanuts and later pine trees to reclaim and restore the land. Population losses continued throughout the 20th century, as the forest and lumber industry did not require as many laborers.

In 1965, some of the towns in the county began to redevelop their historic properties to attract tourists and expand the economy. Lumpkin, Omaha and Louvale all had relatively intact historic properties and commercial districts. Green Grove is an historic African-American community established by freedmen after the Civil War. Stewart was the first rural county in the state to use historic preservation and Main Street redevelopment to support heritage tourism.

== Geography ==
According to the U.S. Census Bureau, the county has a total area of 464 square miles (1,200 km^{2}), of which 459 square miles (1,190 km^{2}) is land and 4.9 square miles (13 km^{2}) (1.1%) is water. The county is mainly located in the upper Gulf coastal plain region of the state, with a few hills due to its close proximity to the fall line.

The vast majority of Stewart County is located in the Middle Chattahoochee River-Walter F. George Lake sub-basin of the ACF River Basin (Apalachicola-Chattahoochee-Flint River Basin). Just the very eastern edge of the county, bordered by a north-to-south line running through Richland, is located in the Kinchafoonee-Muckalee sub-basin of the same ACF Basin, with the very southeastern corner located in the Ichawaynochaway Creek sub-basin of the larger ACF River Basin.

=== Major highways ===
- U.S. Route 27 / State Route 1
  - State Route 1 Connector
- U.S. Route 280
- State Route 27
- State Route 39
  - State Route 39 Connector
  - State Route 39 Spur
- State Route 520

=== Adjacent counties ===
- Chattahoochee County (north)
- Webster County (east)
- Randolph County (south)
- Quitman County (southwest)
- Barbour County, Alabama (west/CST Border)
- Russell County, Alabama (northwest/CST Border except for Phenix City as the city is jointed by the Columbus Metropolitan Area)

=== National protected area ===
- Eufaula National Wildlife Refuge (part)

== Communities ==
=== Cities ===
- Lumpkin
- Richland

=== Unincorporated communities ===
- Louvale
- Omaha
- Florence
- Sanford

== Demographics ==
Historical population
Census	Pop.	Note	%±
1840	12,933		—
1850	16,027		23.9%
1860	13,422		−16.3%
1870	14,204		5.8%
1880	13,998		−1.5%
1890	15,682		12.0%
1900	15,856		1.1%
1910	13,437		−15.3%
1920	12,089		−10.0%
1930	11,114		−8.1%
1940	10,603		−4.6%
1950	9,194		−13.3%
1960	7,371		−19.8%
1970	6,511		−11.7%
1980	5,896		−9.4%
1990	5,654		−4.1%
2000	5,252		−7.1%
2010	6,058		15.3%
2020	5,314		−12.3%
2025 (est.)	4,631	▼	−12.9%
U.S. Decennial Census; 1790-1880 1890-1910; 1920-1930 1930-1940; 1940-1950 1960-1980; 1980-2000 2010

=== Racial and ethnic composition ===
Stewart County, Georgia – Racial and ethnic composition Note: the US Census treats Hispanic/Latino as an ethnic category. This table excludes Latinos from the racial categories and assigns them to a separate category. Hispanics/Latinos may be of any race.
Race / Ethnicity (NH = Non-Hispanic)	Pop 1980	Pop 1990	Pop 2000	Pop 2010	Pop 2020	% 1980	% 1990	% 2000	% 2010	% 2020
White alone (NH)	2,073	2,036	1,926	1,655	1,338	35.16%	36.01%	36.67%	27.32%	25.18%
Black or African American alone (NH)	3,734	3,567	3,201	2,833	2,461	63.33%	63.09%	60.95%	46.76%	46.31%
Native American or Alaska Native alone (NH)	3	13	12	11	10	0.05%	0.23%	0.23%	0.18%	0.19%
Asian alone (NH)	9	12	9	44	167	0.15%	0.21%	0.17%	0.73%	3.14%
Native Hawaiian or Pacific Islander alone (NH)	x	x	0	1	5	x	x	0.00%	0.02%	0.09%
Other race alone (NH)	0	0	0	9	8	0.00%	0.00%	0.00%	0.15%	0.15%
Mixed race or Multiracial (NH)	x	x	25	51	108	x	x	0.48%	0.84%	2.03%
Hispanic or Latino (any race)	77	26	79	1,454	1,217	1.31%	0.46%	1.50%	24.00%	22.90%
Total	5,896	5,654	5,252	6,058	5,314	100.00%	100.00%	100.00%	100.00%	100.00%

=== 2020 census ===
As of the 2020 census, there were 5,314 people, 1,674 households, and 1,138 families residing in the county, and the median age was 40.9 years.

13.1% of residents were under the age of 18, and 17.1% were 65 years of age or older; for every 100 females there were 167.0 males, and for every 100 females age 18 and over there were 182.0 males age 18 and over. 0.0% of residents lived in urban areas, while 100.0% lived in rural areas.

The racial makeup of the county was 25.4% White, 46.4% Black or African American, 0.2% American Indian and Alaska Native, 3.2% Asian, 0.1% Native Hawaiian and Pacific Islander, 22.1% from some other race, and 2.5% from two or more races. Hispanic or Latino residents of any race comprised 22.9% of the population.

There were 1,674 households in the county, of which 24.0% had children under the age of 18 living with them and 37.9% had a female householder with no spouse or partner present. About 35.0% of all households were made up of individuals and 15.6% had someone living alone who was 65 years of age or older.

There were 2,103 housing units, of which 20.4% were vacant. Among occupied housing units, 72.3% were owner-occupied and 27.7% were renter-occupied. The homeowner vacancy rate was 0.9% and the rental vacancy rate was 7.1%.

== Parks and recreation ==
Florence Marina State Park and Providence Canyon State Park are located in Stewart County.

About 800 acres (3.2 km^{2}) of the Eufaula National Wildlife Refuge are located along the Chattahoochee River's eastern shores in Stewart County. In addition, the Hannahatchee Wildlife Management Area is a 5,600-acre (23 km^{2}) hunting preserve.

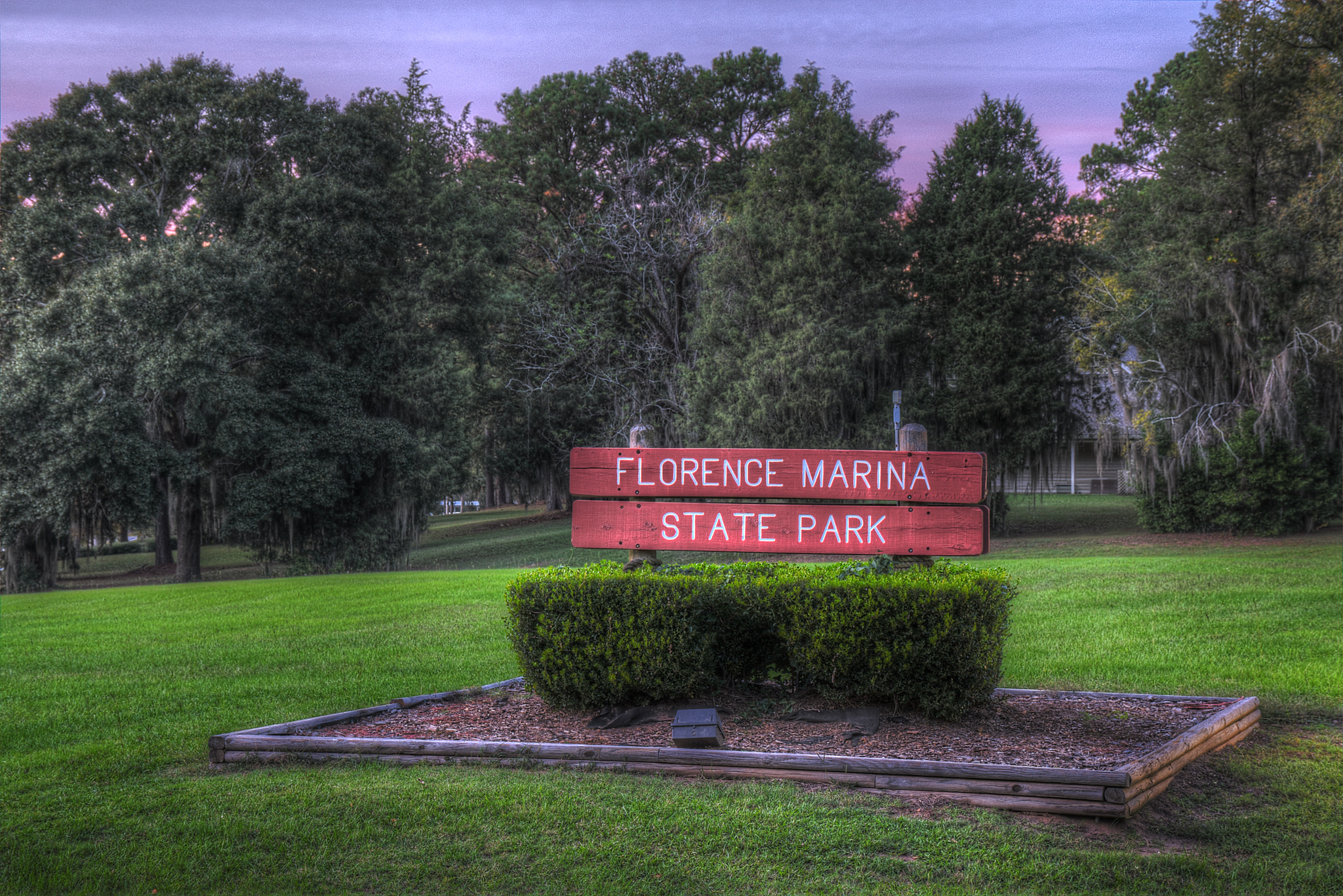
Florence Marina

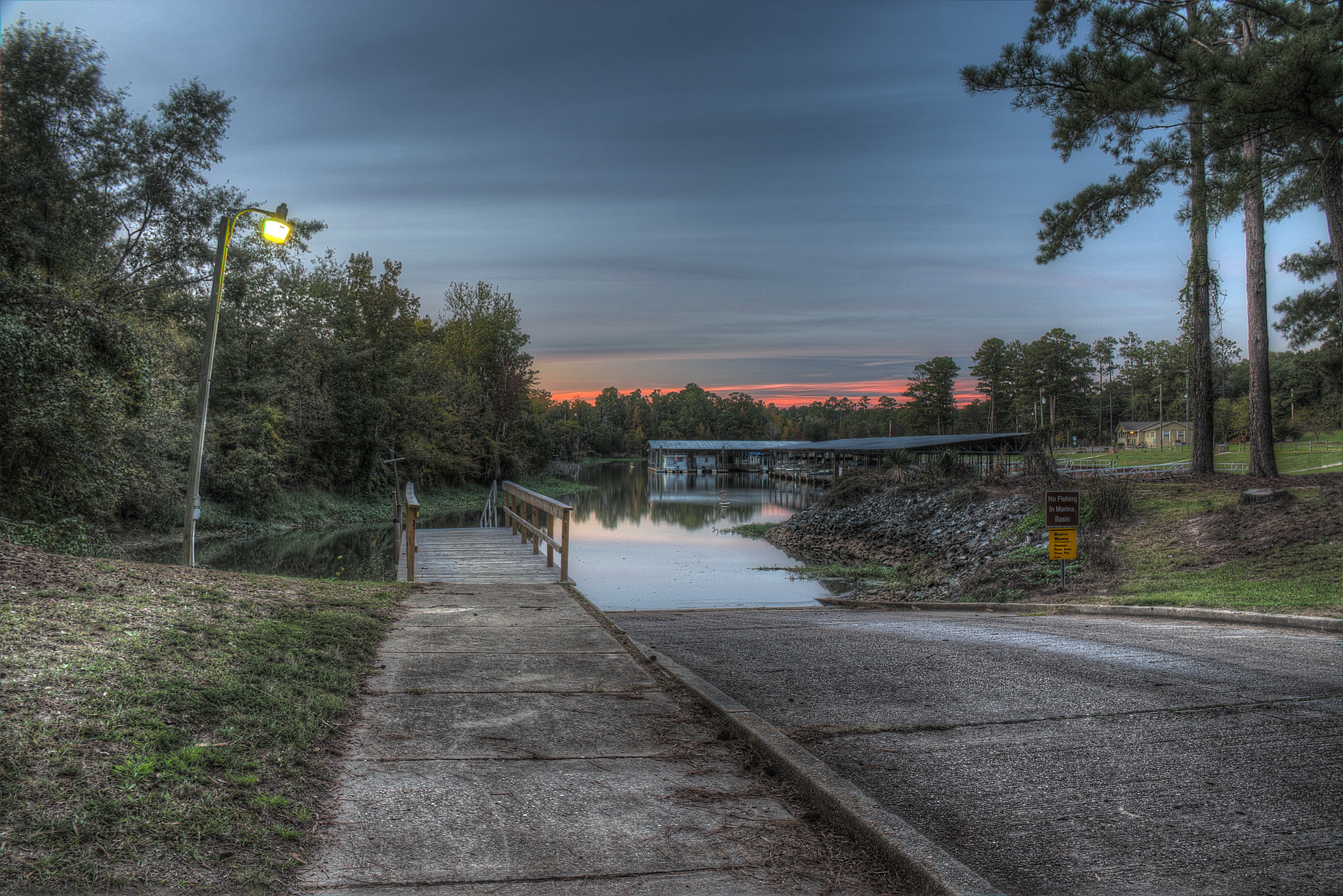
Boat Ramp at Florence Marina

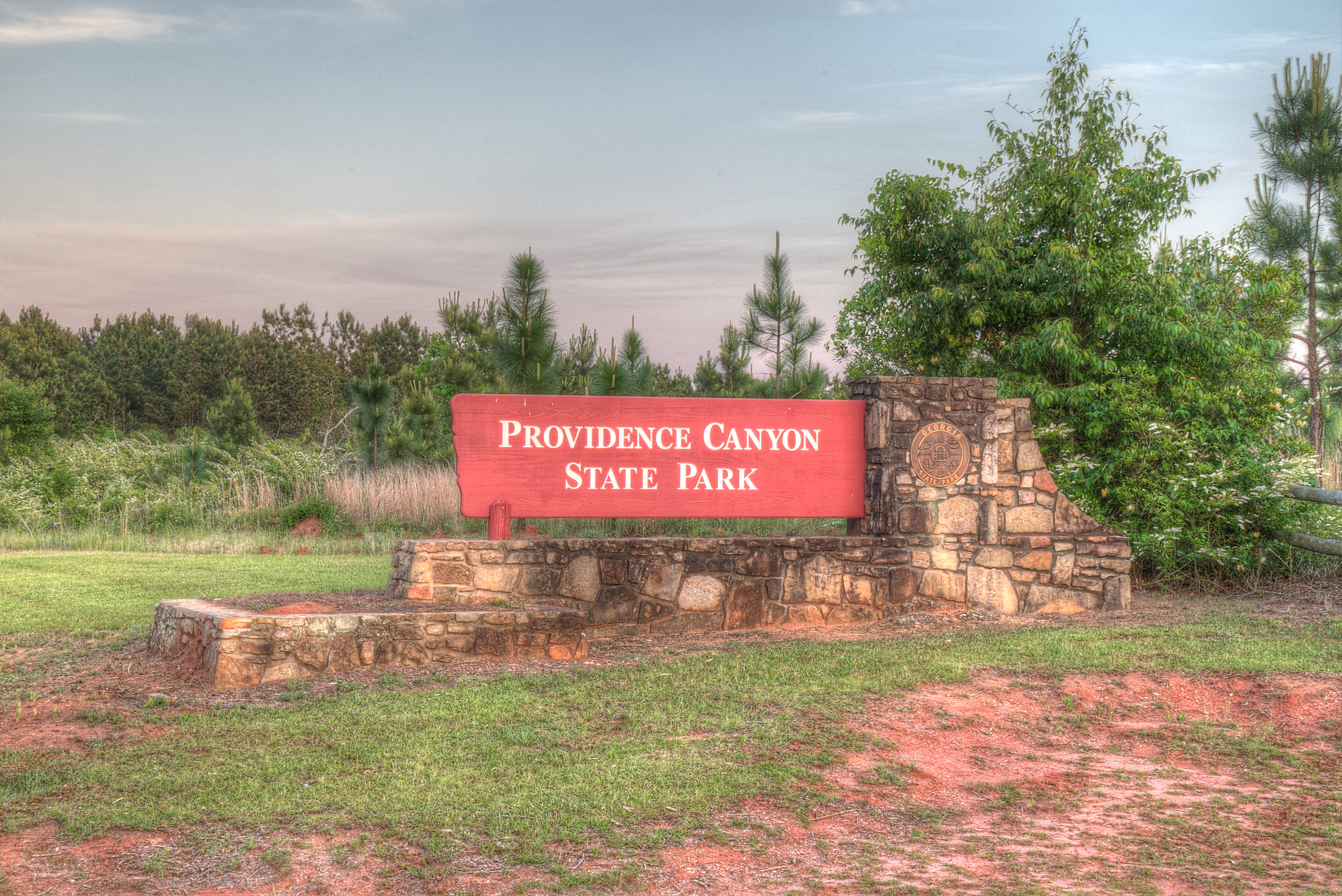
Providence Canyon

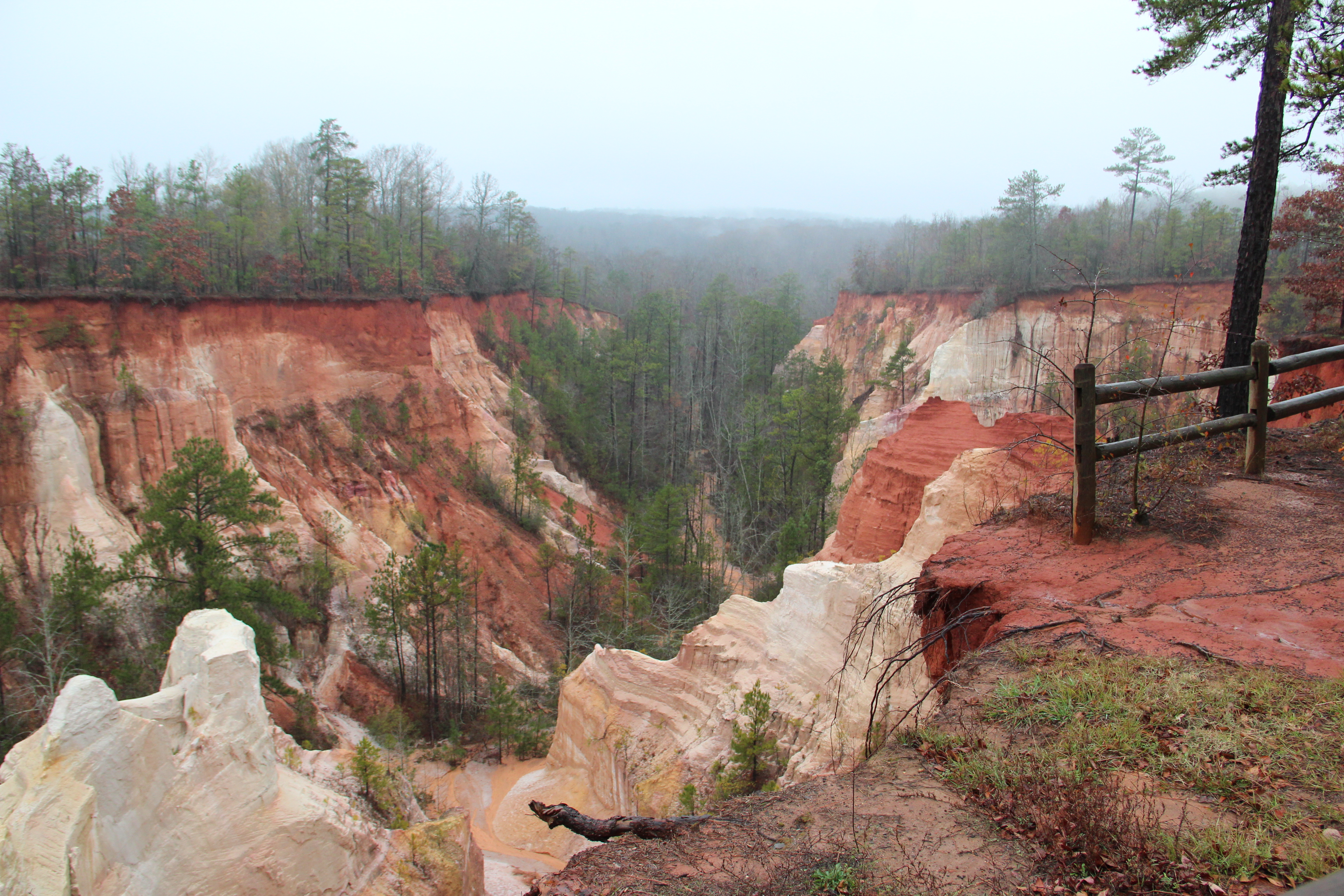
Providence Canyon

== Politics ==
As of the 2020s, Stewart County is a Democratic stronghold, voting 58% for Kamala Harris in 2024. In US presidential elections between 1880 and 2024 Stewart County has only voted Republican twice.

For elections to the United States House of Representatives, Stewart County is part of Georgia's 2nd congressional district, currently represented by Sanford Bishop. For elections to the Georgia State Senate, Stewart County is part of District 15. For elections to the Georgia House of Representatives, Stewart County is part of District 151.

Sheriff Larry Jones is the Chief Law Enforcement Officer for Stewart County.

United States presidential election results for Stewart County, Georgia
Year	Republican		Democratic		Third party(ies)	
Year	No.	%	No.	%	No.	%
1912	7	1.47%	452	94.96%	17	3.57%
1916	14	2.74%	474	92.76%	23	4.50%
1920	31	8.27%	344	91.73%	0	0.00%
1924	24	5.16%	408	87.74%	33	7.10%
1928	88	10.73%	732	89.27%	0	0.00%
1932	15	2.48%	588	97.03%	3	0.50%
1936	49	7.20%	628	92.22%	4	0.59%
1940	52	7.98%	600	92.02%	0	0.00%
1944	78	11.56%	597	88.44%	0	0.00%
1948	46	7.82%	276	46.94%	266	45.24%
1952	311	27.60%	816	72.40%	0	0.00%
1956	235	25.35%	692	74.65%	0	0.00%
1960	302	31.86%	646	68.14%	0	0.00%
1964	1,037	73.39%	373	26.40%	3	0.21%
1968	233	14.09%	489	29.56%	932	56.35%
1972	1,020	74.29%	353	25.71%	0	0.00%
1976	433	20.97%	1,632	79.03%	0	0.00%
1980	611	29.28%	1,440	69.00%	36	1.72%
1984	805	38.10%	1,308	61.90%	0	0.00%
1988	832	42.17%	1,136	57.58%	5	0.25%
1992	1,186	40.77%	1,540	52.94%	183	6.29%
1996	525	23.67%	1,537	69.30%	156	7.03%
2000	675	34.54%	1,267	64.84%	12	0.61%
2004	797	39.22%	1,220	60.04%	15	0.74%
2008	783	37.13%	1,305	61.88%	21	1.00%
2012	745	35.89%	1,323	63.73%	8	0.39%
2016	805	39.12%	1,222	59.38%	31	1.51%
2020	801	40.25%	1,182	59.40%	7	0.35%
2024	847	41.77%	1,177	58.04%	4	0.20%

United States Senate election results for Stewart County, Georgia2
Year	Republican		Democratic		Third party(ies)	
Year	No.	%	No.	%	No.	%
2020	803	41.12%	1,115	57.09%	35	1.79%
2020	687	38.12%	1,115	61.88%	0	0.00%

United States Senate election results for Stewart County, Georgia3
Year	Republican		Democratic		Third party(ies)	
Year	No.	%	No.	%	No.	%
2020	390	20.47%	764	40.10%	751	39.42%
2020	801	36.61%	1,387	63.39%	0	0.00%
2022	638	40.71%	916	58.46%	13	0.83%
2022	534	37.26%	899	62.74%	0	0.00%

Georgia Gubernatorial election results for Stewart County
Year	Republican		Democratic		Third party(ies)	
Year	No.	%	No.	%	No.	%
2022	673	42.78%	895	56.90%	5	0.32%

== Education ==
The Stewart County School District includes Stewart County Elementary School, Stewart County Middle School, and Stewart County High School.

== See also ==
- National Register of Historic Places listings in Stewart County, Georgia
- List of counties in Georgia
