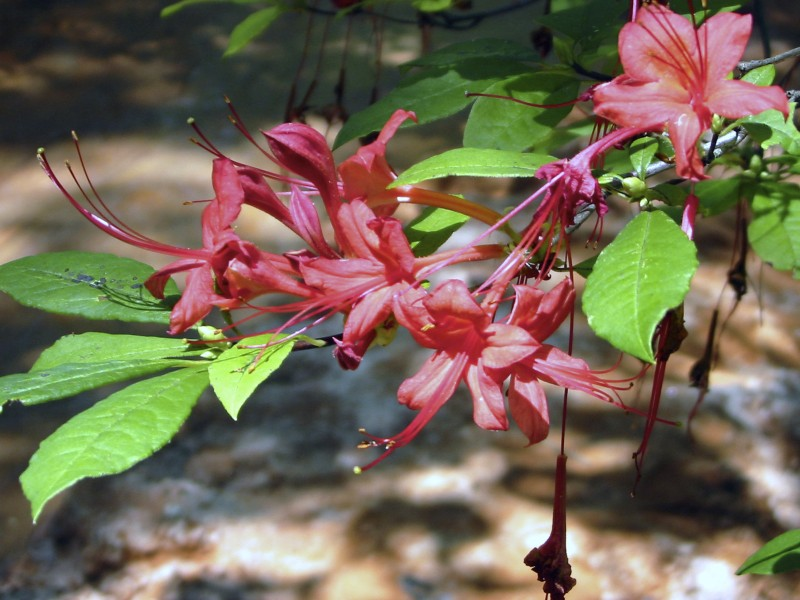

Conservation status
- Vulnerable (NatureServe)

Scientific classification
- Kingdom: Plantae
- Clade: Tracheophytes
- Clade: Angiosperms
- Clade: Eudicots
- Clade: Asterids
- Order: Ericales
- Family: Ericaceae
- Genus: Rhododendron
- Species: R. prunifolium

Binomial name
- Rhododendron prunifolium (Small) Millais

Synonyms
- Azalea prunifolia Small

= Rhododendron prunifolium =

Species of plant

Rhododendron prunifolium, the plumleaf azalea, is a wild azalea that grows only in a few counties along the Georgia–Alabama border in the Chattahoochee River Valley. It is considered the rarest azalea in the Eastern United States. Providence Canyon is one of the most popular places to view the plumleaf azalea in the wild.
