= Omaha, Georgia =

- Unincorporated community
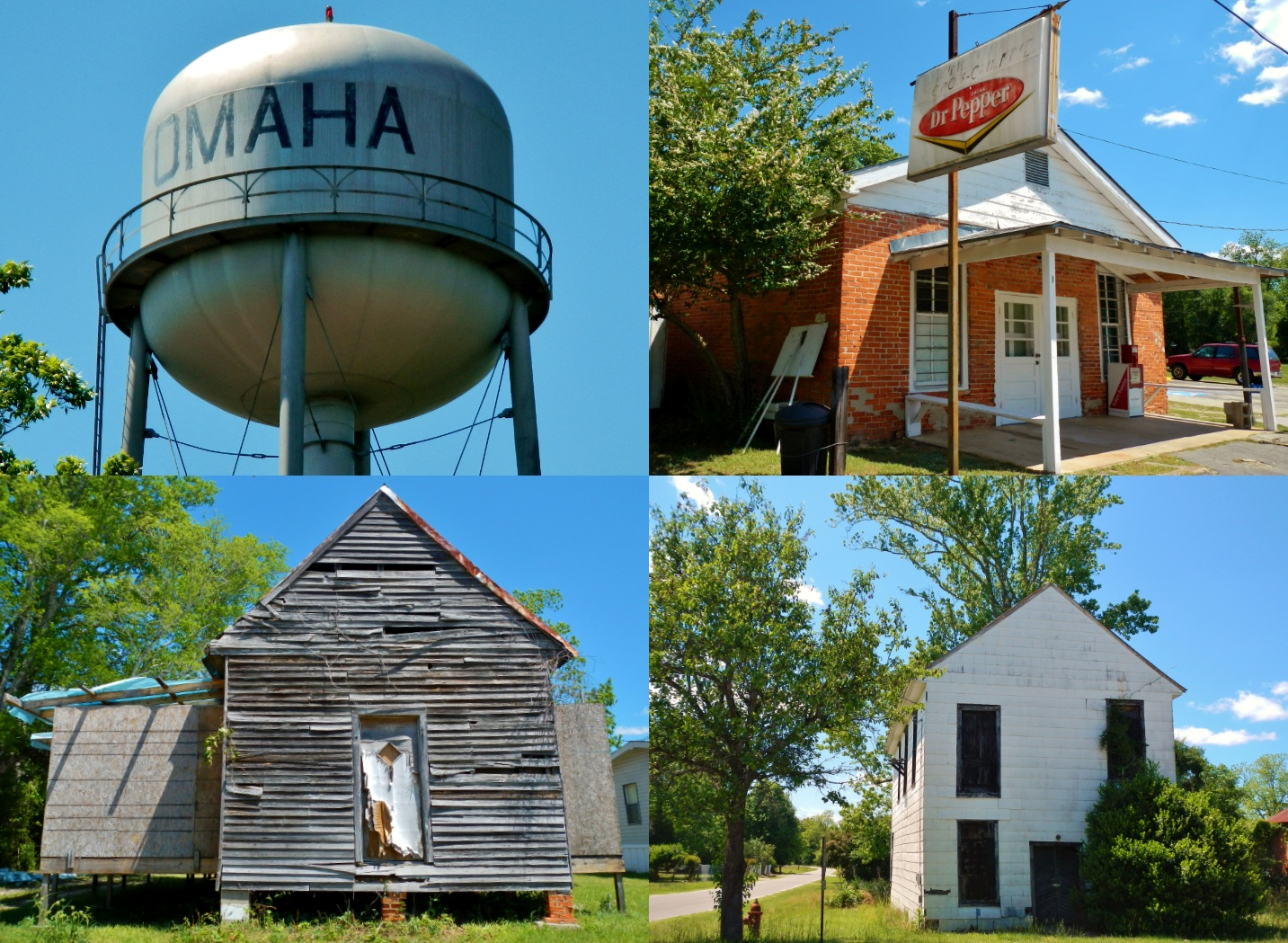
- Interactive map of Omaha, Georgia
- Coordinates: 32°08′47″N 85°00′48″W
- Country: United States
- State: Georgia
- Counties: Stewart

Area
  - Total: 184.9 sq mi (479 km^{2})

Population (July 2007)
  - Total: 1,611
  - Density: 8.7/sq mi (3.4/km^{2})
- Time zone: UTC-5 (Eastern (EST))
  - Summer (DST): UTC-4 (EDT)
- ZIP code: 31821

Omaha is an unincorporated community in Stewart County, Georgia, United States.

== Geography ==
Omaha is located in the northwest corner of Stewart County near the juncture of the Chattahoochee River and Hannahatchee Creek.

Georgia State Route 39 is the main road through the community, leading east 12 mi (19 km) to U.S. Route 27 near Louvale and south 22 mi (35 km) to Georgetown. Georgia State Route 39 Spur connects the community with the Alabama state line, approximately 2 mi (3.2 km) to the west across the Chattahoochee River.

Fitzgerald Cemetery is located about a mile outside of town.

Florence Marina State Park is located outside of Omaha. The Roods Landing site is located south of Omaha.

== History ==
Omaha was founded in the 1891 when the railroad arrived.

The Georgia General Assembly incorporated Omaha as a town in 1891. The town's municipal charter was dissolved in 1995.

=== Fort McCreary ===
Located one mile north of Omaha, Fort McCreary was built in 1836 for the defense of Georgia´s frontier along the Chattahoochee River. During the Creek War of 1836 it was garrisoned by U.S. soldiers and Georgia Volunteers under command of a General McClesky. A relief column from the fort saved the day for Capt. Hamilton Garmany's company of Georgia militia during a battle on the Shepherd Plantation, the most aggressive Creek attack of the war. Three unknown soldiers lie buried on the crest of the fort, which is now owned by Roanoke chapter of the Daughters of the American Revolution. A period wooden blockhouse was reconstructed at the site of Fort McCreary in 1996.

== In popular culture ==
- Omaha is mentioned in James Joyce's novel Ulysses as the fictional scene of a lynching:

Hanging over the bloody paper with Alf looking for spicy bits instead of attending to the general public. Picture of a butting match, trying to crack their bloody skulls, one chap going for the other with his head down like a bull at a gate. And another one: Black Beast Burned in Omaha, Ga. A lot of Deadwood Dicks in slouch hats and they firing at a Sambo strung up in a tree with his tongue out and a bonfire under him. Gob, they ought to drown him in the sea after and electrocute and crucify him to make sure of their job.

- The cathouse scene of The Long Riders, starring Dennis and Randy Quaid and Keith and David Carradine, was filmed in the Lee house which was located next to the Fitzgerald Cemetery until it was torn down due to disrepair some years ago.

== Gallery ==
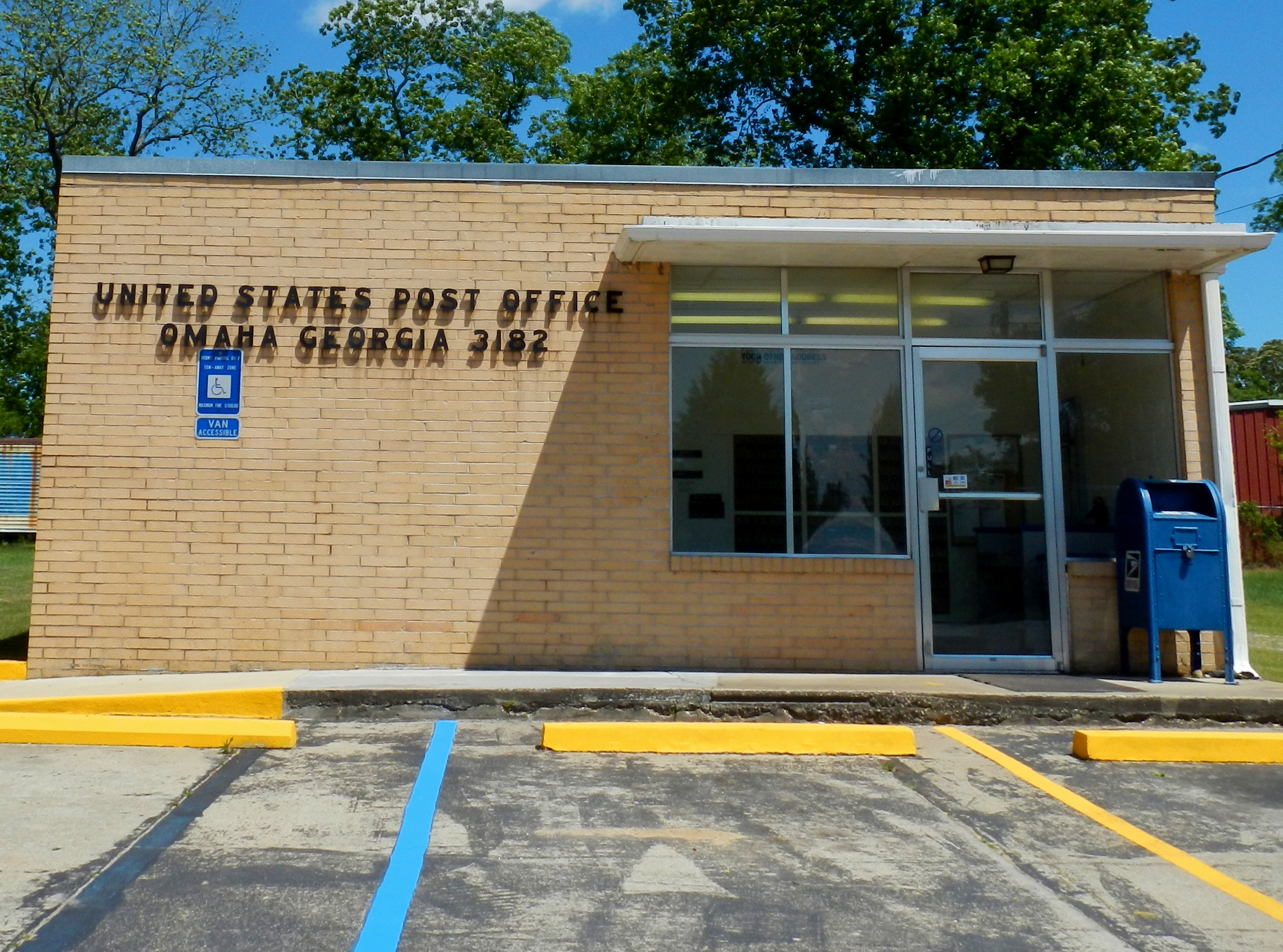
Omaha Post Office (ZIP code: 31821)

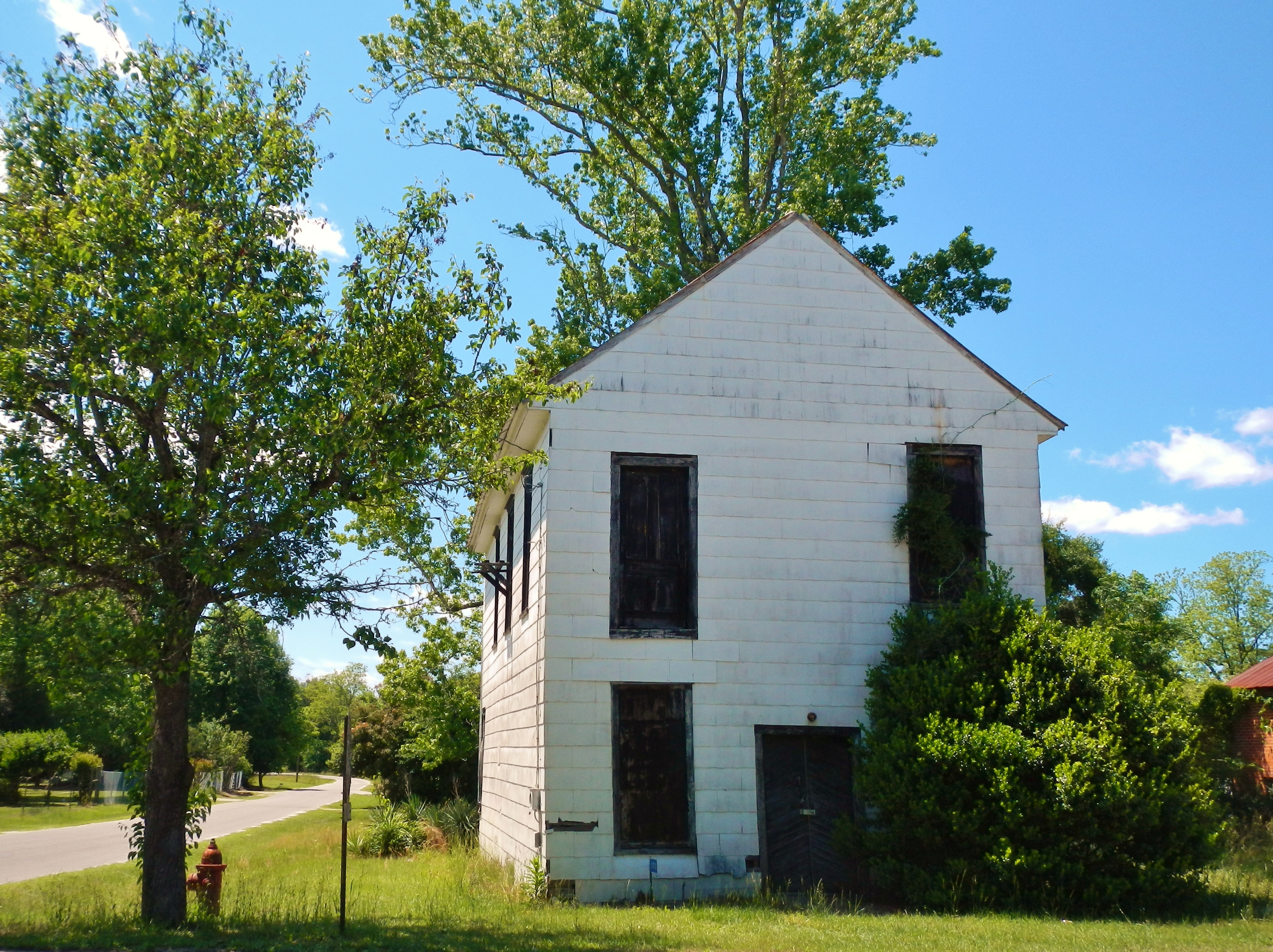
The Hiram Masonic Lodge dates back to the 1840s. The building has half-round log floor joints. A store was operated on the lower floor in the 1930s.

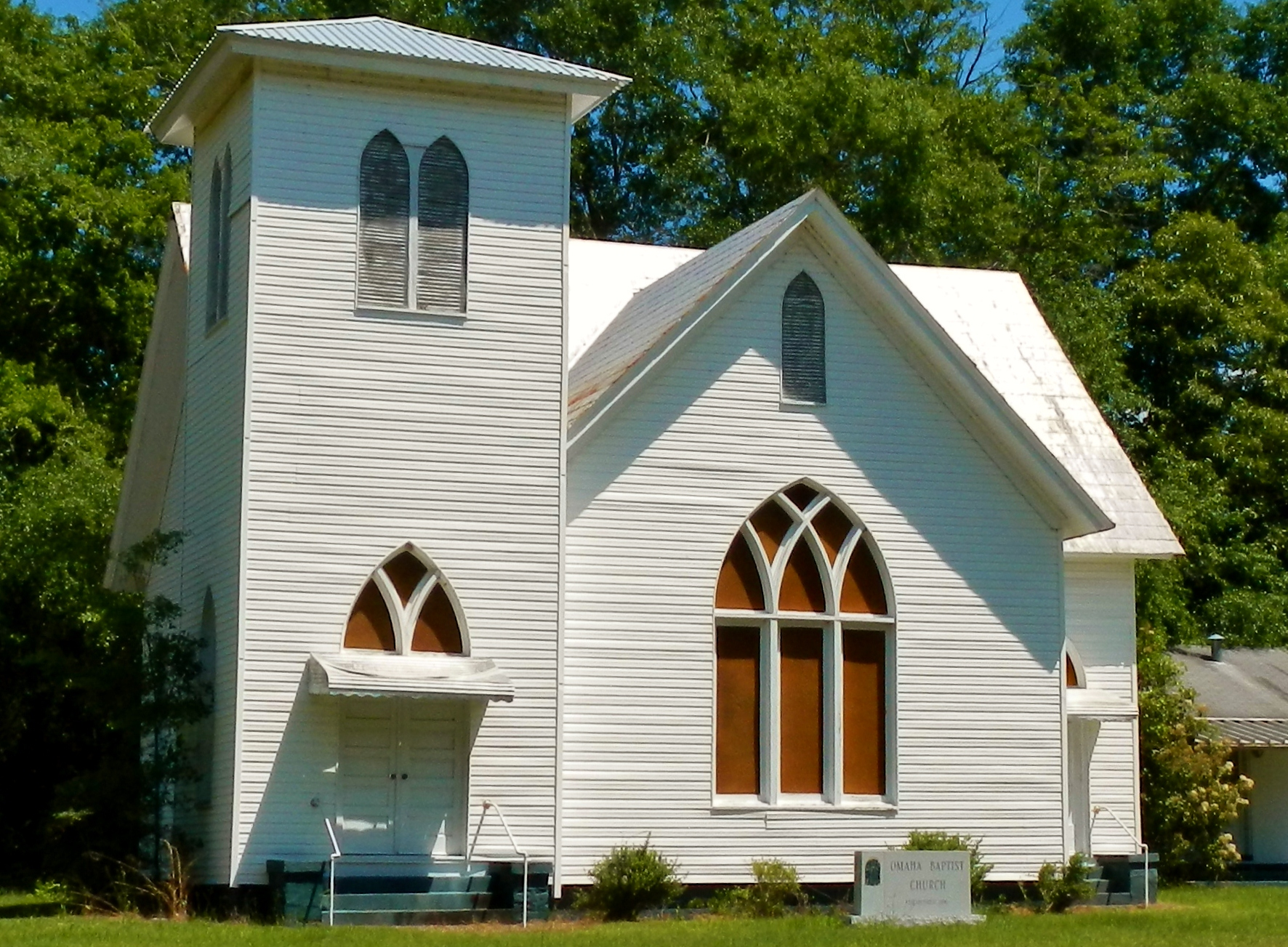
The Omaha Baptist Church was established in the late 1800s. The present building was constructed in 1914 following a tornado that destroyed much of the town including the original church building in 1913.

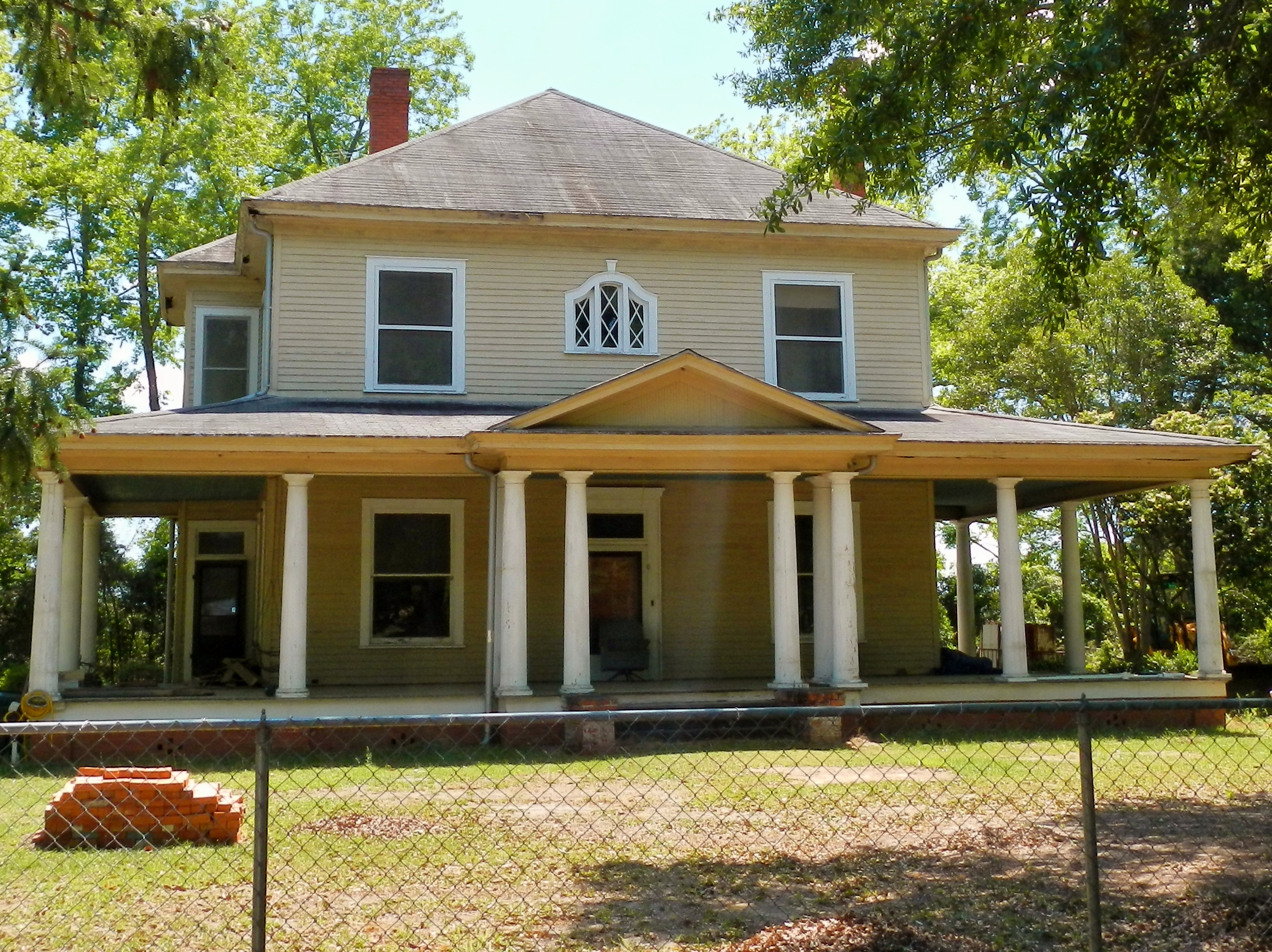
Walter E. Fitzgerald's original house was destroyed in the tornado of 1913. The current nineteen-room structure was built as a replacement in 1914.

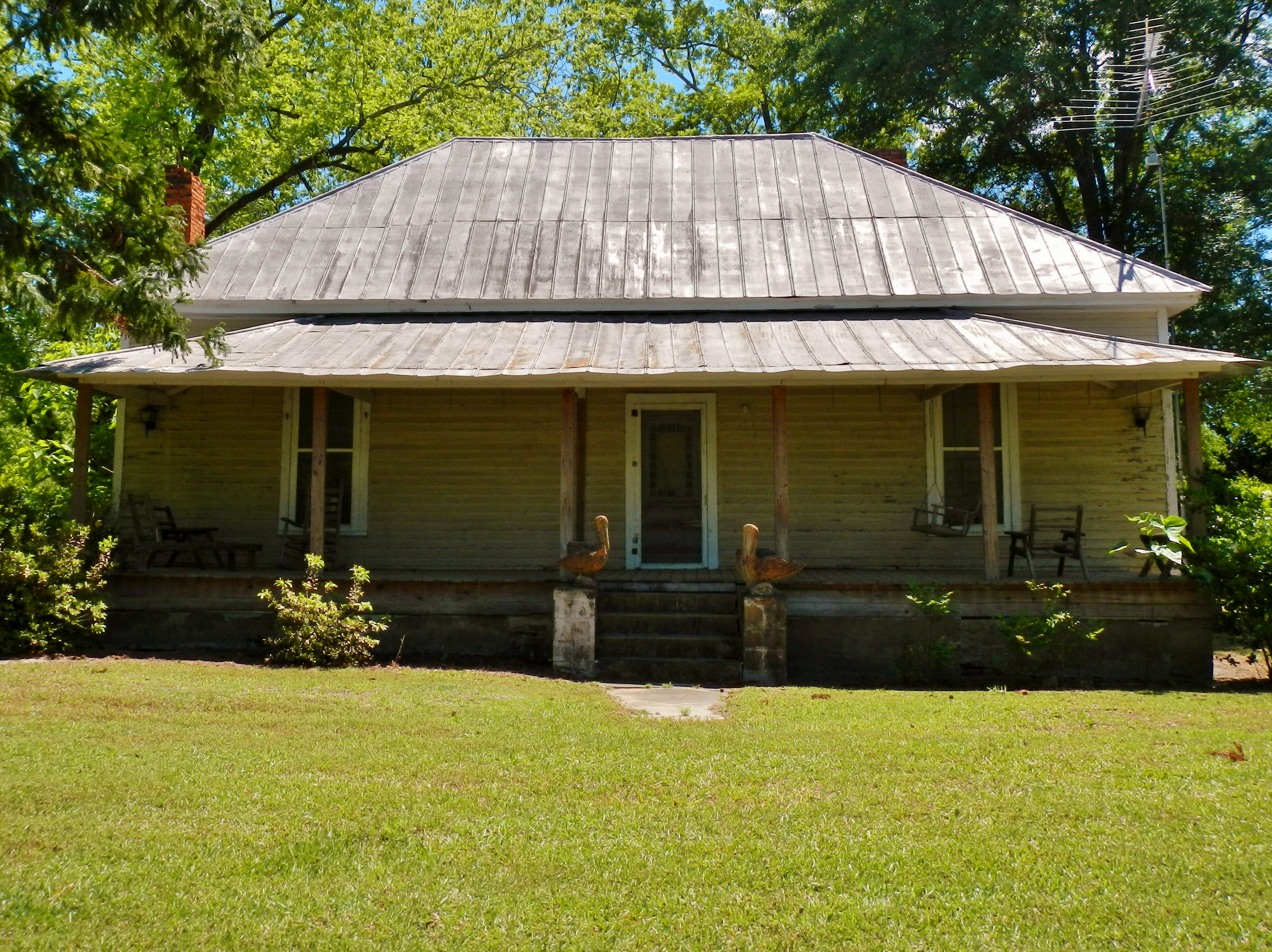
Mrs. Johnnie Brown House (c. 1850s)

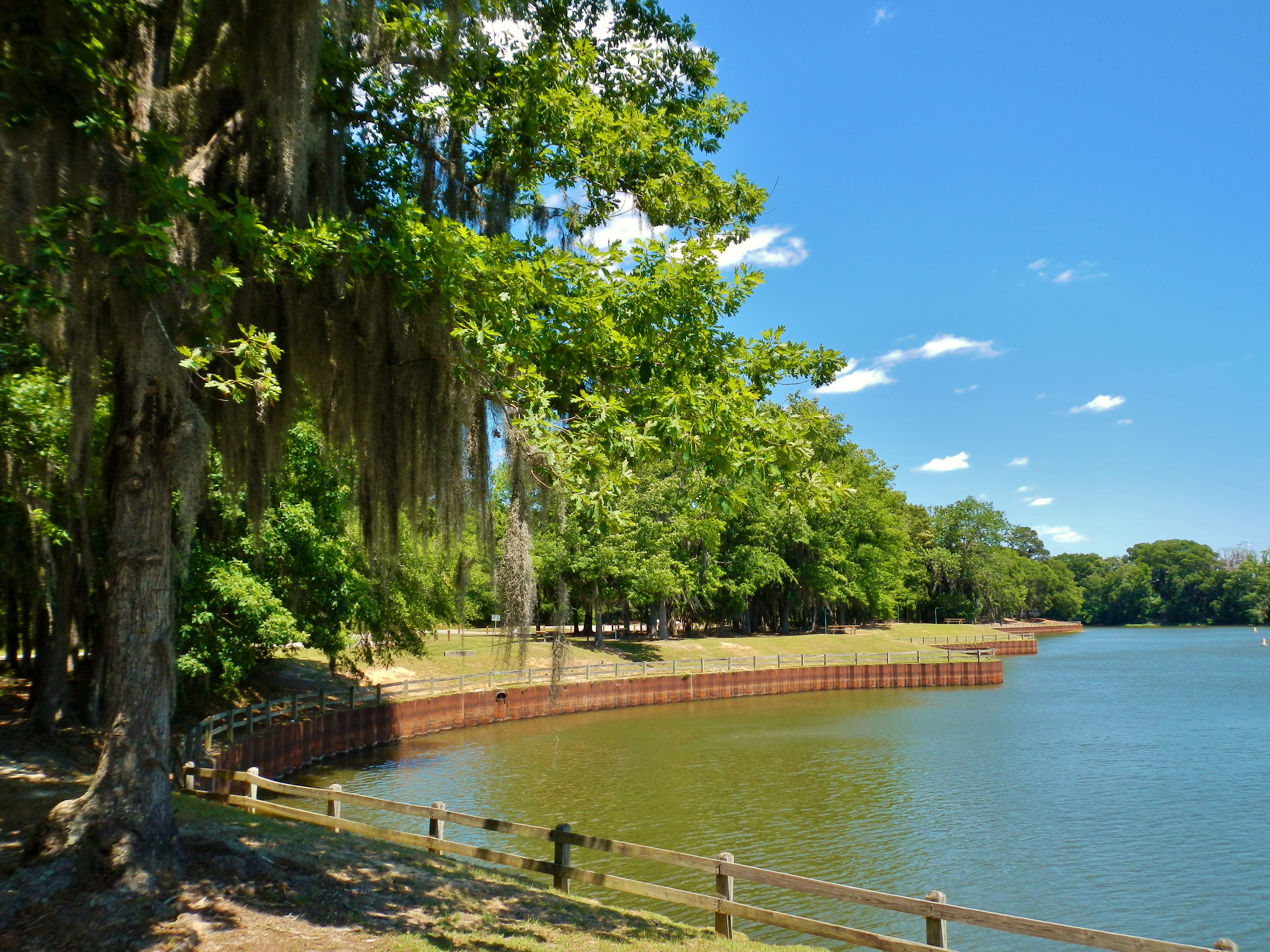
The Rood Creek Landing Recreation Area, just south of Omaha, is the location of the Roods Landing site, a Middle Woodland / Mississippian period Pre-Columbian complex of burial mounds.

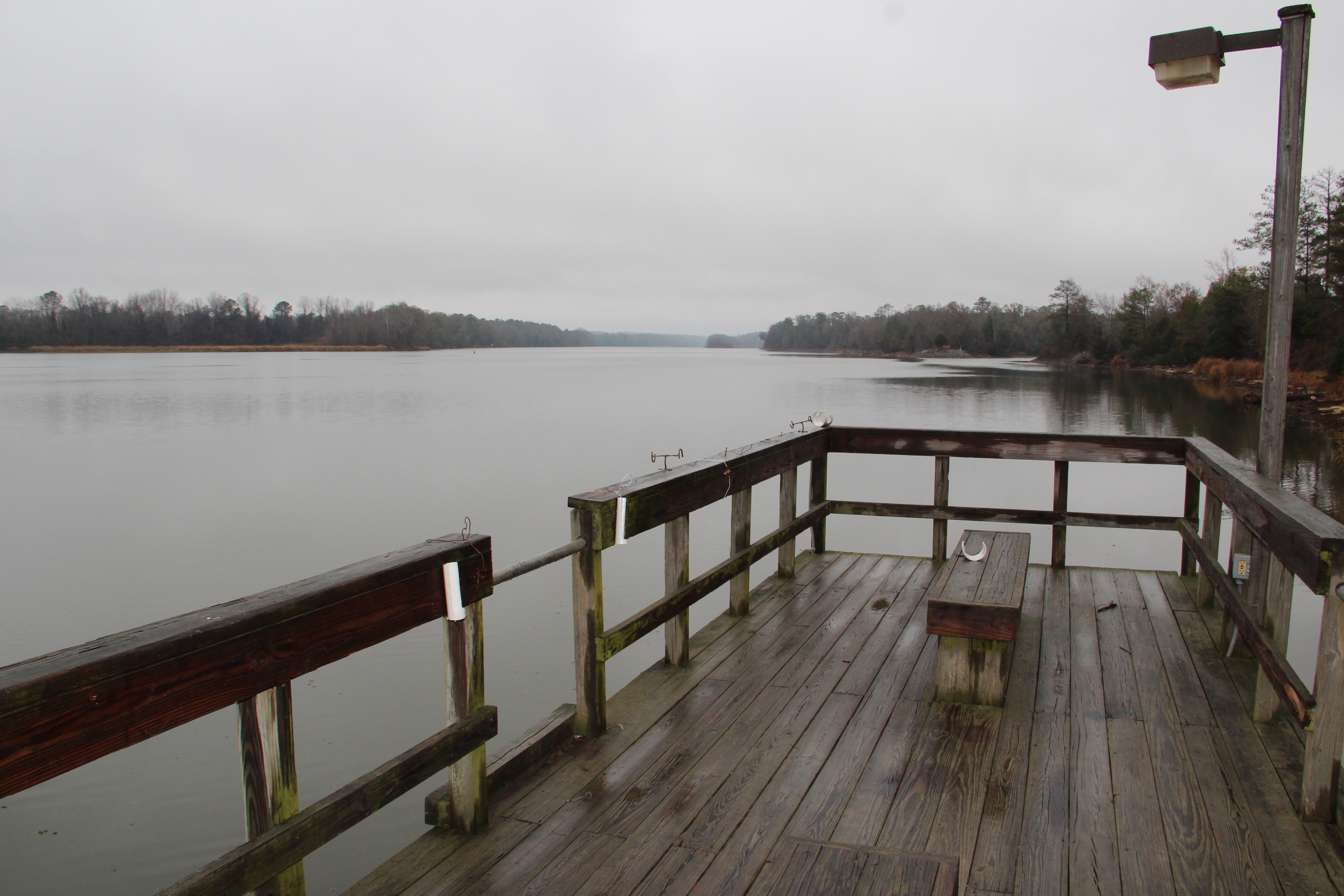
Florence Marina State Park is a 173-acre Georgia state park located near Omaha on the eastern shore of Walter F. George Lake. The park is known for its deep-water marina and its many water recreation sports, such as fishing and waterskiing.
