= Providence Canyon State Park =

State park in Georgia, United States

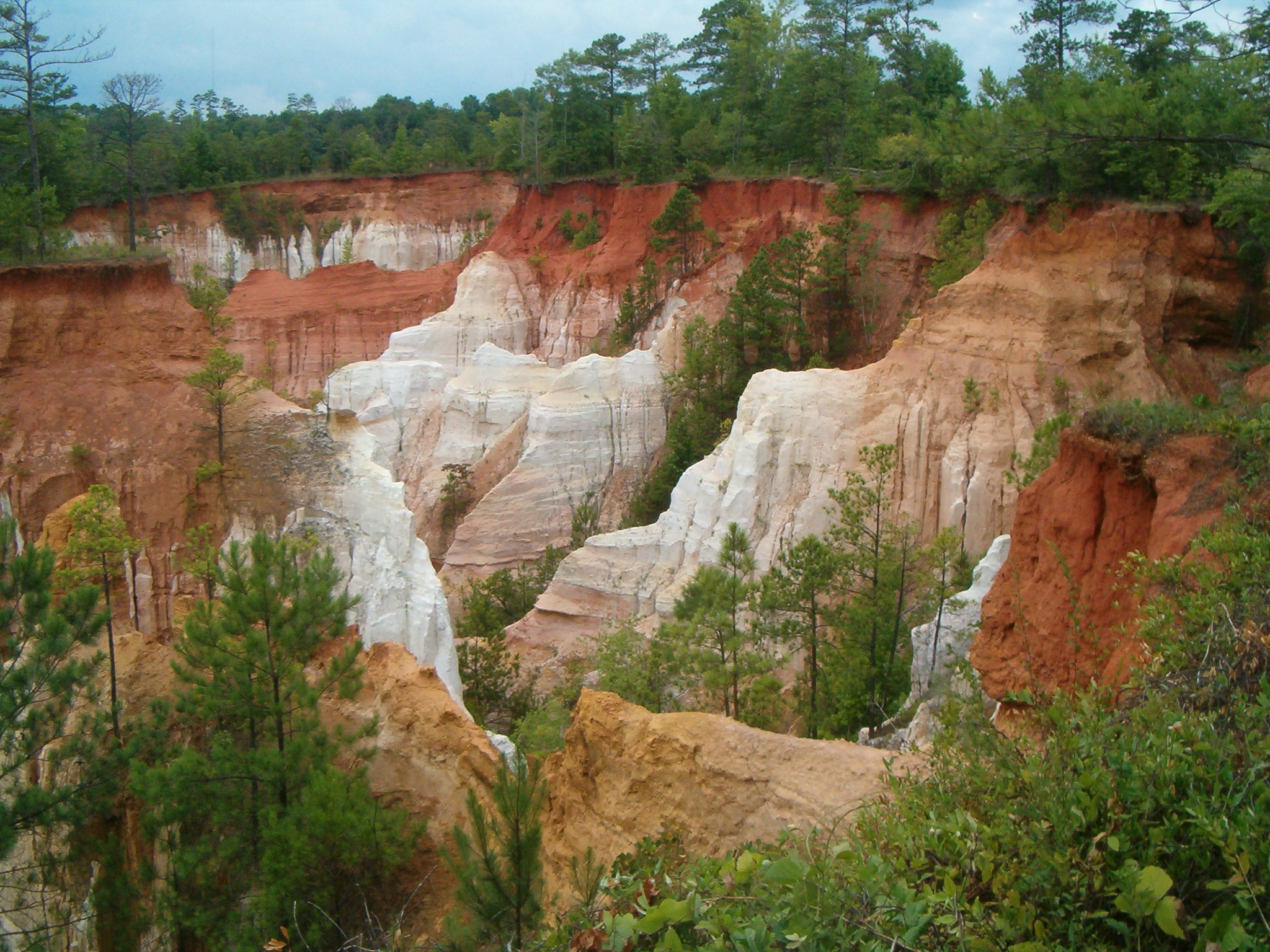
- Providence Canyon from the rim

- Location within Georgia Location within the United States
- Interactive map of Providence Canyon State Park
- Location: Stewart County, Georgia, United States
- Nearest city: Lumpkin, Georgia
- Coordinates: 32°03′48″N 84°55′10″W
- Area: 2,706 acres (1,095 ha)
- Elevation: 500 ft (150 m)
- Established: 1971
- Operator: Georgia Department of Natural Resources
- Visitors: 339,594 (in 2024)
- Named after: The Providence Methodist Church
- Website: Official website
- Georgia State Parks

Providence Canyon State Park is a 2,706-acre (1,095 ha) Georgia state park located in Stewart County in southwest Georgia, United States. The park contains Providence Canyon, which is sometimes called Georgia's "Little Grand Canyon". It is considered one of the Seven Wonders of Georgia. It is also home to the very rare plumleaf azalea.

One of the more unusual attractions of the state park is an abandoned homestead including nearly a dozen rusty, 1950s-era cars and trucks. Due to the environmental damage that removing the vehicles would cause, park officials have decided to leave them alone.

== Canyon formation ==
Providence Canyon is not a natural feature: the massive gullies—the deepest of which is more than 150 feet (46 m)—are the result of erosion due to poor farming practices by settlers in the 19th century.

This story of the origin of the canyons has been commonplace since the 1940s, but the formations in the canyons are at least partially natural. Although there were probably a few early arrivals before 1825, the first heavy influx of settlers in Stewart County only came after the Treaty of Indian Springs (1825), by which the Creek Indians were forced to cede all their lands east of the Chattahoochee River. Evidence of the existence of the canyons at this time includes their mention in a deed by James S. Lunsford to William Tatam from 1836.

== Geology ==
The park lies on marine sediments, usually loam or clay, with small areas of sand. Loamy sand topsoils overlie subsoils of sandy clay loam, sandy clay, or clay in most of the uneroded sections. Nankin, Cowarts, Mobila, and Orangeburg are the most prominent soil series. The canyons have significant exposure to clay, over which water often seeps. Water is mobile in this well-drained area.

== Activities and amenities ==
The park offers hiking trails, picnicking and primitive campsites.

== Gallery ==
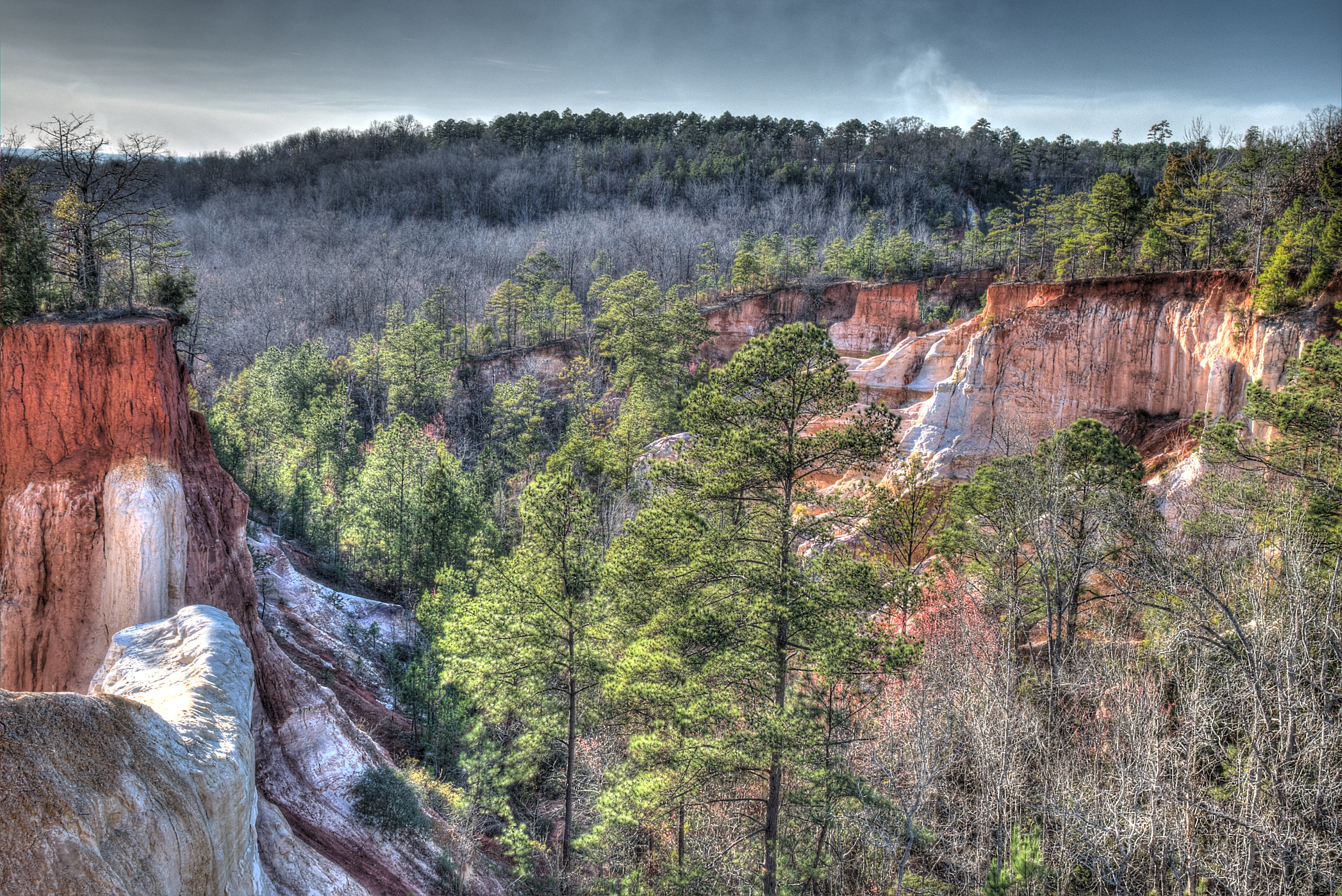
View from canyon rim

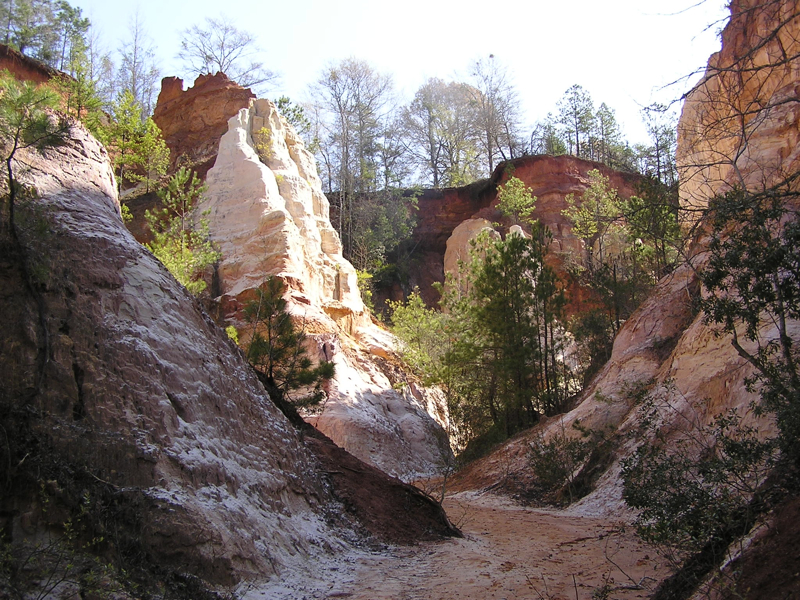
View from canyon floor

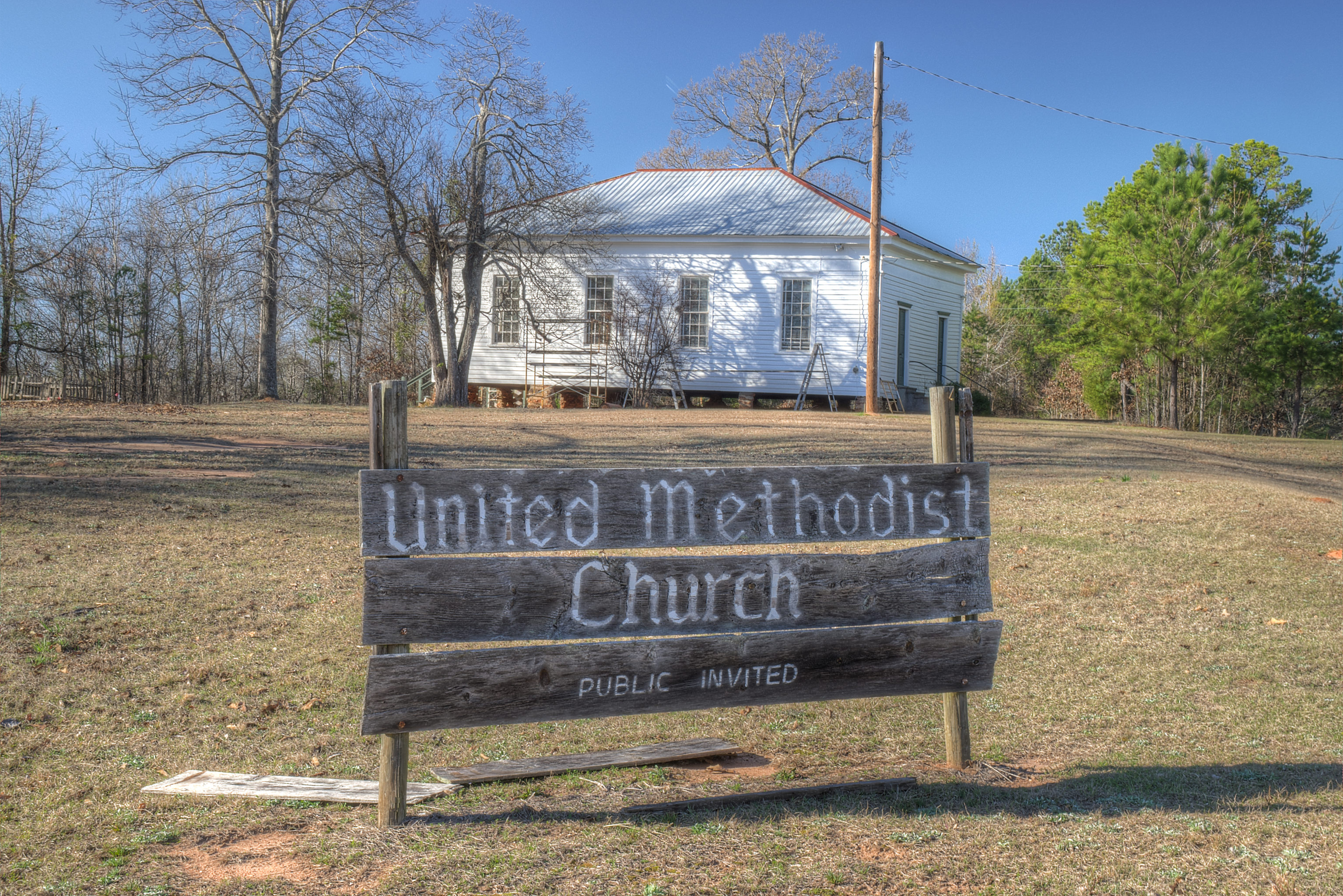
Providence Methodist Church

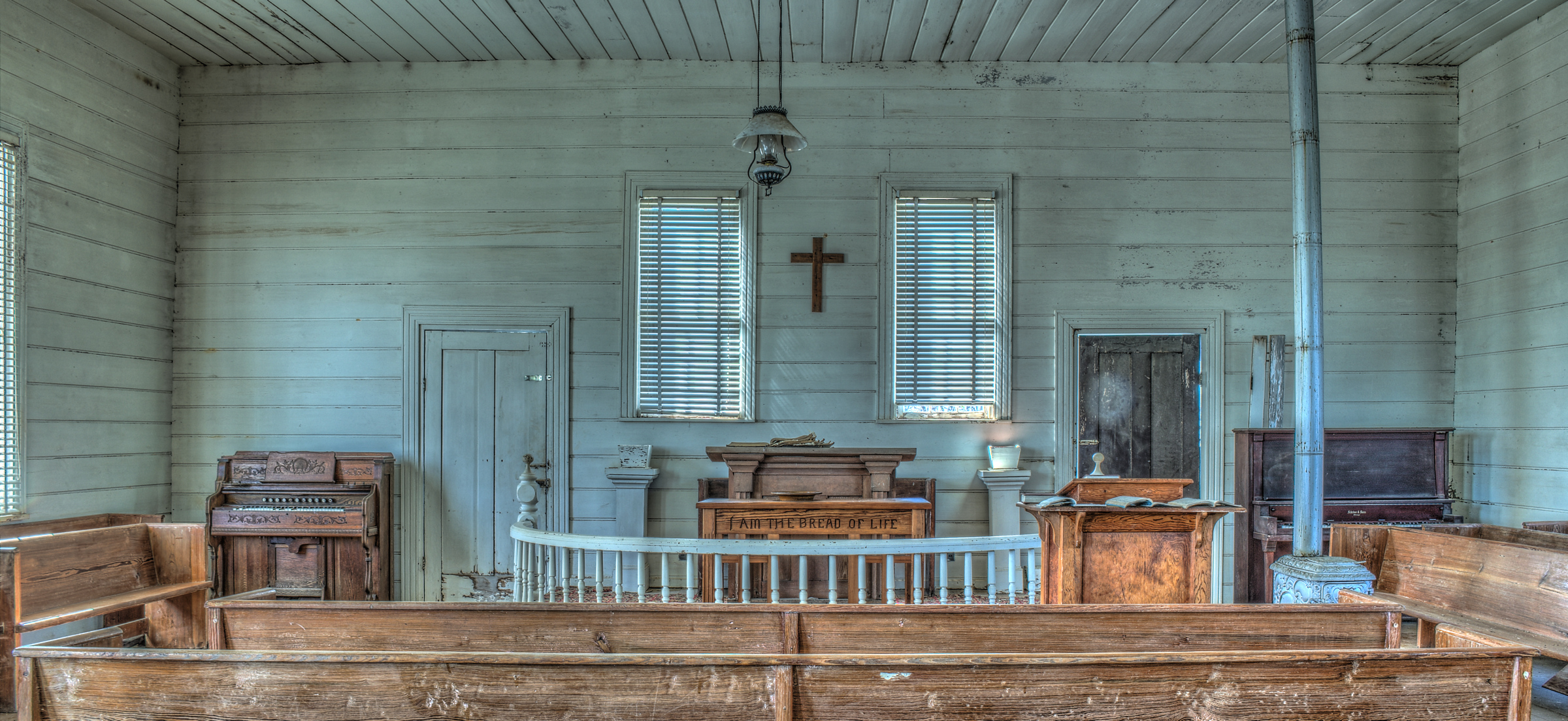
Interior of Providence Methodist Church

== See also ==
- Red Bluff, Mississippi
