= Velda Mound =

Archaeological site in Florida, US

- Velda Mound Archaeological Site; 8LE44
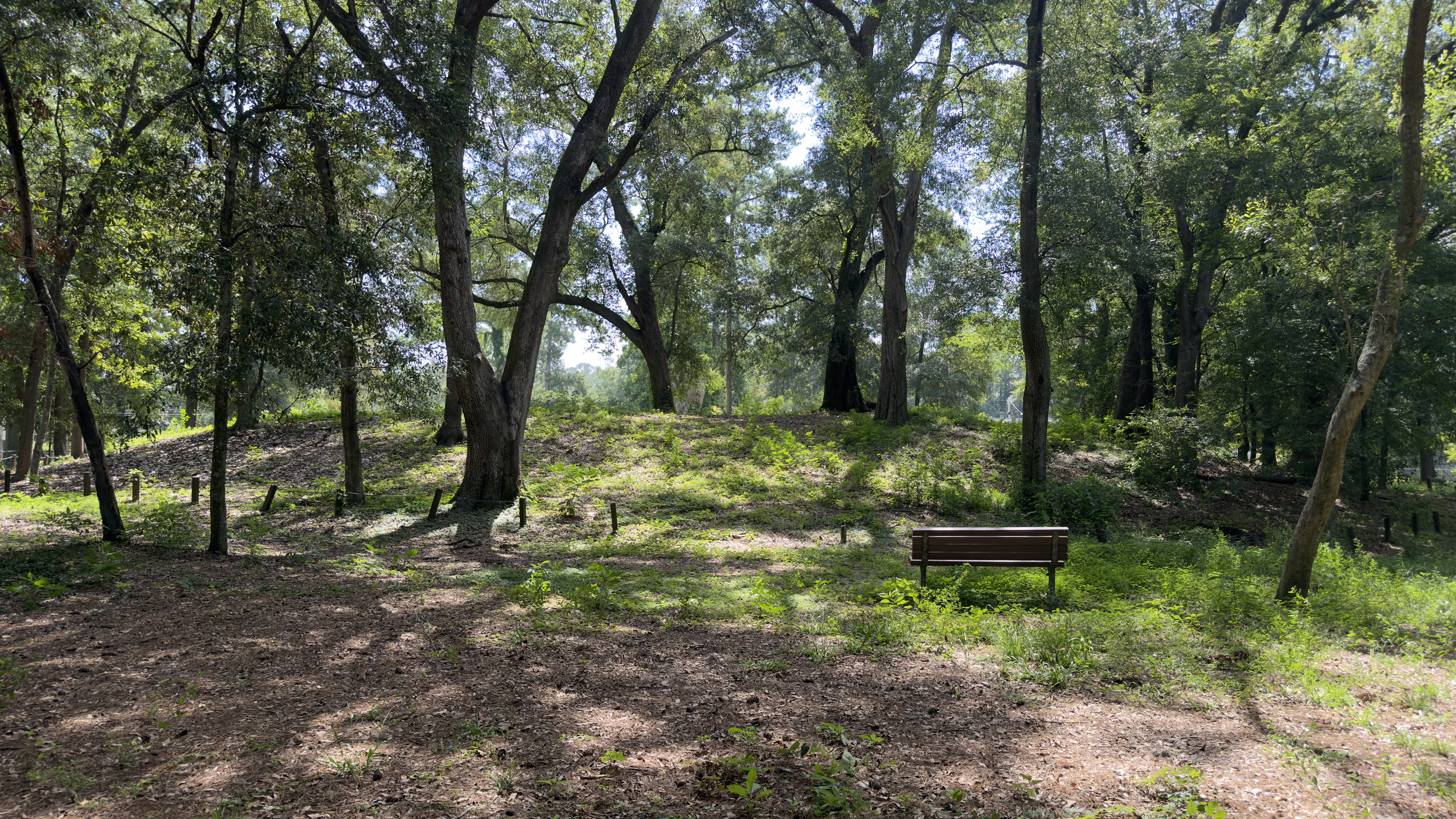
- Looking east towards the mound

- Location within Florida Location within the United States
- Interactive map of Velda Mound
- 30°30′04″N 84°13′20″W
- Periods: Lake Jackson phase, Velda phase
- Cultures: Fort Walton culture, Apalachee
- Location: Leon County, Florida, USA
- Region: Apalachee Province
- Nearest city: Tallahassee, Florida

History
- Built: c. 1450
- Abandoned: c. 1625

Site notes
- Area: 1.91 acres (0.77 ha)
- Architectural style: Platform mound
- Excavation dates: 1969
- Archaeologists: L. Ross Morrell, Wilburn Cockrell
- Governing body: Florida Department of State, Division of Historical Resources
- Owner: State of Florida

Designations
- Designation: Florida Heritage Site (2024)

Velda Mound (8LE44) is a Native American archaeological site in northern Tallahassee, Leon County, Florida, United States. The site consists of a small platform mound, an adjacent plaza, and a surrounding village, and was built and occupied by peoples of the Fort Walton culture, a regional expression of the Mississippian culture, and by their descendants the Apalachee. It is one of only five recorded Fort Walton mound sites in Leon County, and lies about 5 miles (8.0 km) east of the much larger Lake Jackson Mounds, the paramount center of the chiefdom that became the Apalachee Province of Spanish Florida.

A radiocarbon date of about AD 1450 was obtained from the associated village, and the archaeologist B. Calvin Jones considered the site to be one of the last Fort Walton centers built in the Tallahassee area. The mound takes its name from the Velda Dairy, which owned the surrounding pasture in the mid-twentieth century. A 1.91 acres (0.77 ha) parcel containing the mound was donated to the State of Florida in 1982; it is owned by the state, managed by the Division of Historical Resources (DHR) of the Florida Department of State (DoS), and maintained as a neighborhood park with volunteer assistance from the Panhandle Archaeological Society at Tallahassee (PAST).

== History ==
=== Cultural context ===
Fort Walton communities in the Tallahassee Hills were among the first in Florida to adopt maize agriculture on a large scale, cultivating maize together with beans and squash while continuing to rely on hunting, fishing, and the gathering of wild resources. Society was hierarchical: a chiefly elite lived at large mound centers such as Lake Jackson, which were supported by smaller single-mound hamlets like Velda and by outlying farmsteads that produced maize. Fort Walton pottery from the site carries the incised scroll motifs characteristic of the wider Fort Walton ceramic tradition, evidence of connections across the regional community.

In 1985 the archaeologist John F. Scarry proposed a Velda phase for the Apalachee Fort Walton area, assigning it a date range of 1450 to 1625. In later formulations of the regional sequence the phase is placed between 1500 and 1633, following a Lake Jackson phase of 1100 to 1500 and preceding a San Luis phase of 1633 to 1704 that corresponds to the Spanish mission period.

=== Occupation and abandonment ===
The mound was raised in about 1450, a date obtained by radiocarbon assay on material from the village. During the site's occupation the mound served as the foundation platform for the residence of the village priest-chief, with residential units, family garden plots, and community fields occupying the ground around it; the site is thought to have functioned something like a town hall for people living in the surrounding countryside.

Sources differ on when occupation ended. The conservation management plan for the site gives a span of about 1450 to 1625 and places abandonment at roughly the beginning of the Spanish mission period, while the Florida Department of State's 2024 historical marker gives about 1450 to 1565. Abandonment has been attributed to the depletion of firewood and building material near the village, together with a need to let fields lie fallow to recover fertility and suppress weeds.

The area may have been used during the Spanish mission period or during the later British, Second Spanish, and Territorial periods, but no artifacts indicating residential use have been recovered. If the land was used at all in those periods it was probably as pasture or cultivated field, and it was certainly taken into later plantation holdings.

== Damage and preservation ==
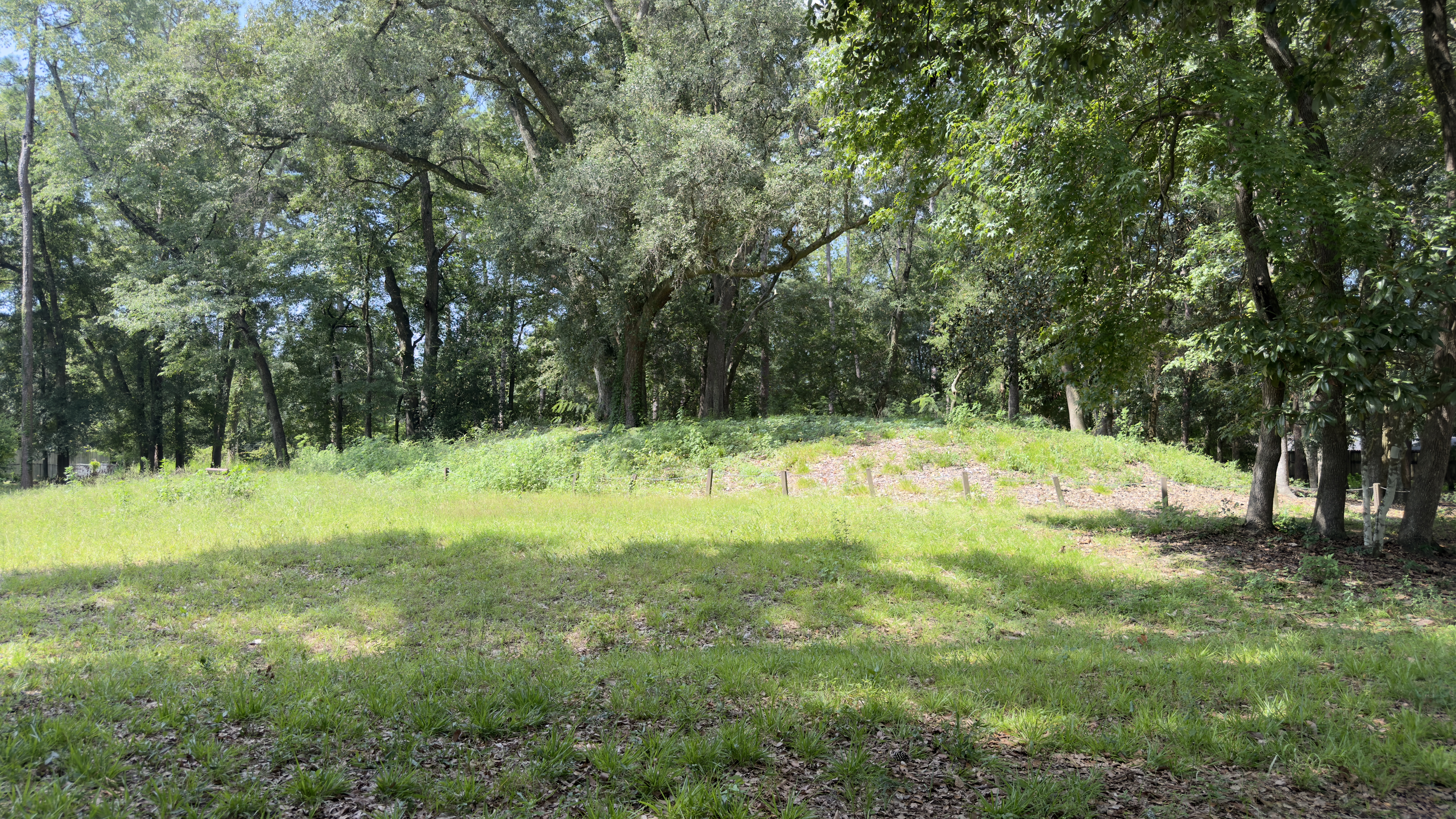
Looking west at the Velda Mound

In the early 1920s the mound attracted antiquarians digging for artifacts. In March 1922 Emma Boyd, head of the vocal music department at Florida State College for Women, was killed when an undermined section of the mound collapsed on her. Boyd and two companions had hired laborers with teams to cut a trench about six feet deep along the side of the mound; when the three women entered the trench to examine it, the wall gave way, burying Boyd completely. Her companions were only partly covered and one was able to summon help, but Boyd was dead when she was reached.

By the 1940s the site formed part of the Velda Dairy Farm, which produced milk for local distribution. During the 1950s, while the land was still in dairy use, someone bulldozed a trench 10 feet (3.0 m) wide through the mound; what was found is not recorded.

About 1973 the Velda Dairy property began to be developed as the Arbor Hills subdivision. In 1978 B. Calvin Jones advised the developers, the C. and S. Mortgage Company, of the mound's importance, and they replied that they would consider leaving it in a small park. The portion of the tract containing the mound was afterward transferred to Metropolitan Developers, Inc. In 1980, after a local resident complained that a construction worker had cut a small backhoe trench into the east side of the mound, the developer's local representative offered to donate the mound and the ground around it to the State of Florida as a neighborhood pocket park. The donation was accepted and the 1.91 acres (0.77 ha) parcel leased to the Division of Historical Resources in 1982. In 1999 the division repaired the damage to the mound and developed the passive park that occupies the site today.

== Archaeology ==
=== Mound complex ===
The site comprises a small rectangular platform mound, a modest plaza, and a village area extending south of the mound. Platform mounds of this kind were built to elevate communal buildings that served as residences for leaders and as council houses, while the plaza provided open ground for civic and religious gatherings such as stickball games and the Green Corn Ceremony. Excavation in the village area documented round houses roughly 25 feet (7.6 m) in diameter, associated with small garden plots as well as shared access to larger communal fields.

=== Excavations ===
In 1969, ahead of the construction of Interstate 10, L. Ross Morrell and Wilburn Cockrell excavated part of the village area about 200 feet (60 m) south of the mound. They identified the remains of three circular houses and many storage pits, several of the pits containing carbonized maize, along with a large quantity of pottery and other artifacts. A contour map of the mound was made at the same time. State archaeologists further identified and mapped the site during the 1970s and 1980s. As of 2010 no further archaeological research had been carried out at the mound or in the surrounding village area.

== Geography ==
Velda Mound stands in the Arbor Hills section of northeastern Tallahassee, in the Tallahassee Hills of the Florida Panhandle. The property straddles the crest of a ridge on Orangeburg fine sandy loam, a well drained upland soil that ranks among the most productive agricultural soils in the region. Second-growth longleaf pine and live oaks are scattered across the tract and over the mound itself; the surrounding ground was cleared for use as cattle pasture before the site was preserved. There are no surface waters or wetlands on the property.

== Park ==
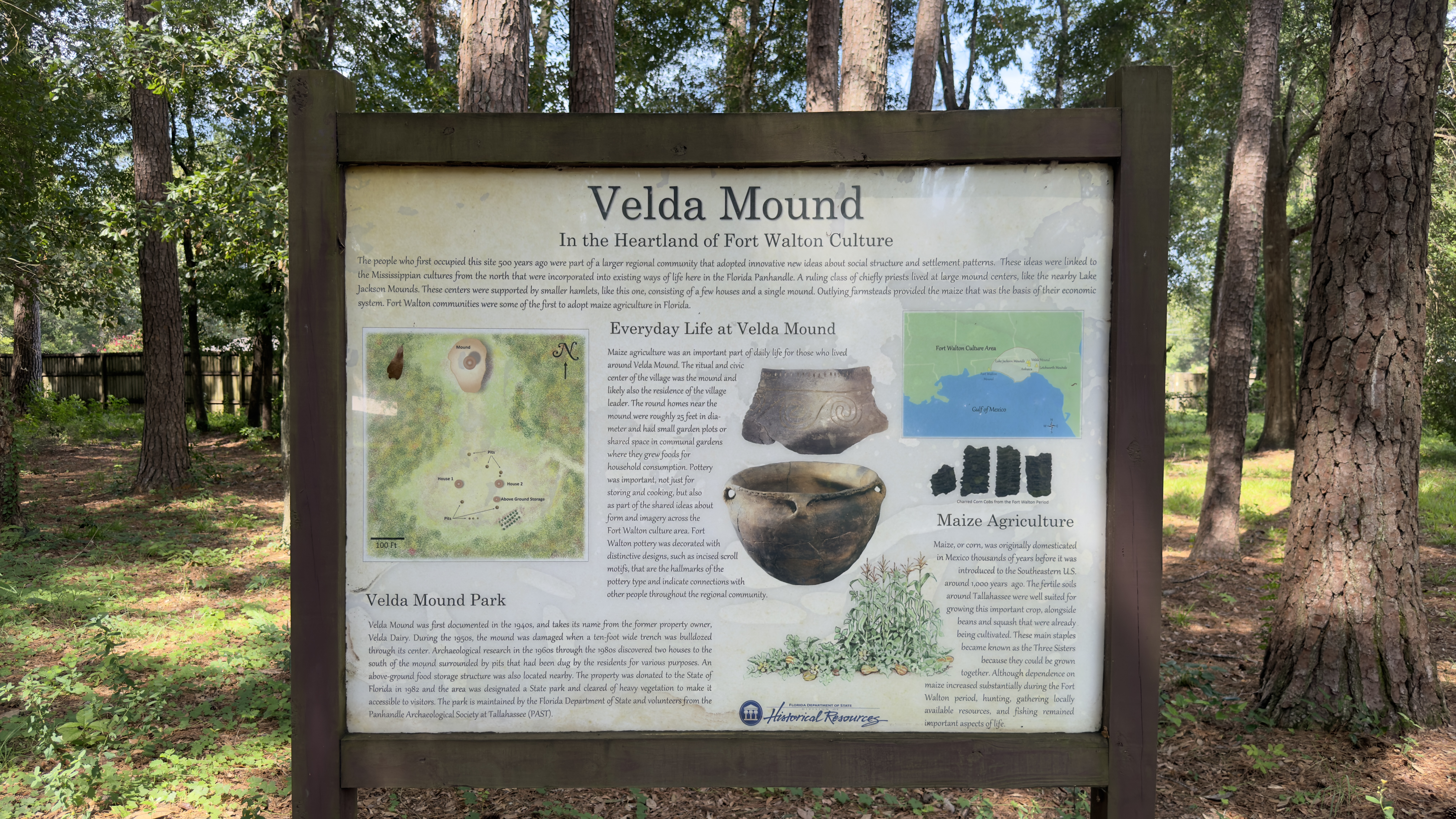
Main infographic at Velda Mound

Velda Mound Park is a passive neighborhood pocket park. Its features include a mulch walking trail around the mound, a post and chain barrier protecting the earthwork, benches, picnic tables, a park sign, and an interpretive kiosk. The DHR contracts for mowing and trail maintenance and works with the PAST, whose volunteers hold periodic work days to remove trash and treat invasive plants, chiefly mimosa. Recurring problems at the park include illegal dumping, after-hours use, and graffiti.

Two interpretive signs stand in the park. An undated panel installed by the Division of Historical Resources, titled Velda Mound: In the Heartland of Fort Walton Culture, describes Fort Walton society, daily life at the village, maize agriculture, and the history of the park. A Florida Heritage Site marker was dedicated in 2024 by the Tallahassee Historical Society, PAST, and the DoS.
