= Fort Walton culture =

Late prehistoric Native American archaeological culture

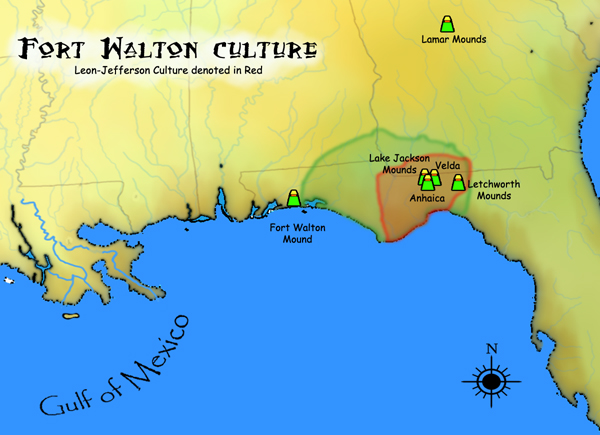
Geographic extent of Fort Walton Culture

The Fort Walton culture is the term used by archaeologists for a late prehistoric Native American archaeological culture that flourished in southeastern North America from approximately 1200~1500 CE and is associated with the historic Apalachee people.

== Origin and definition of term ==
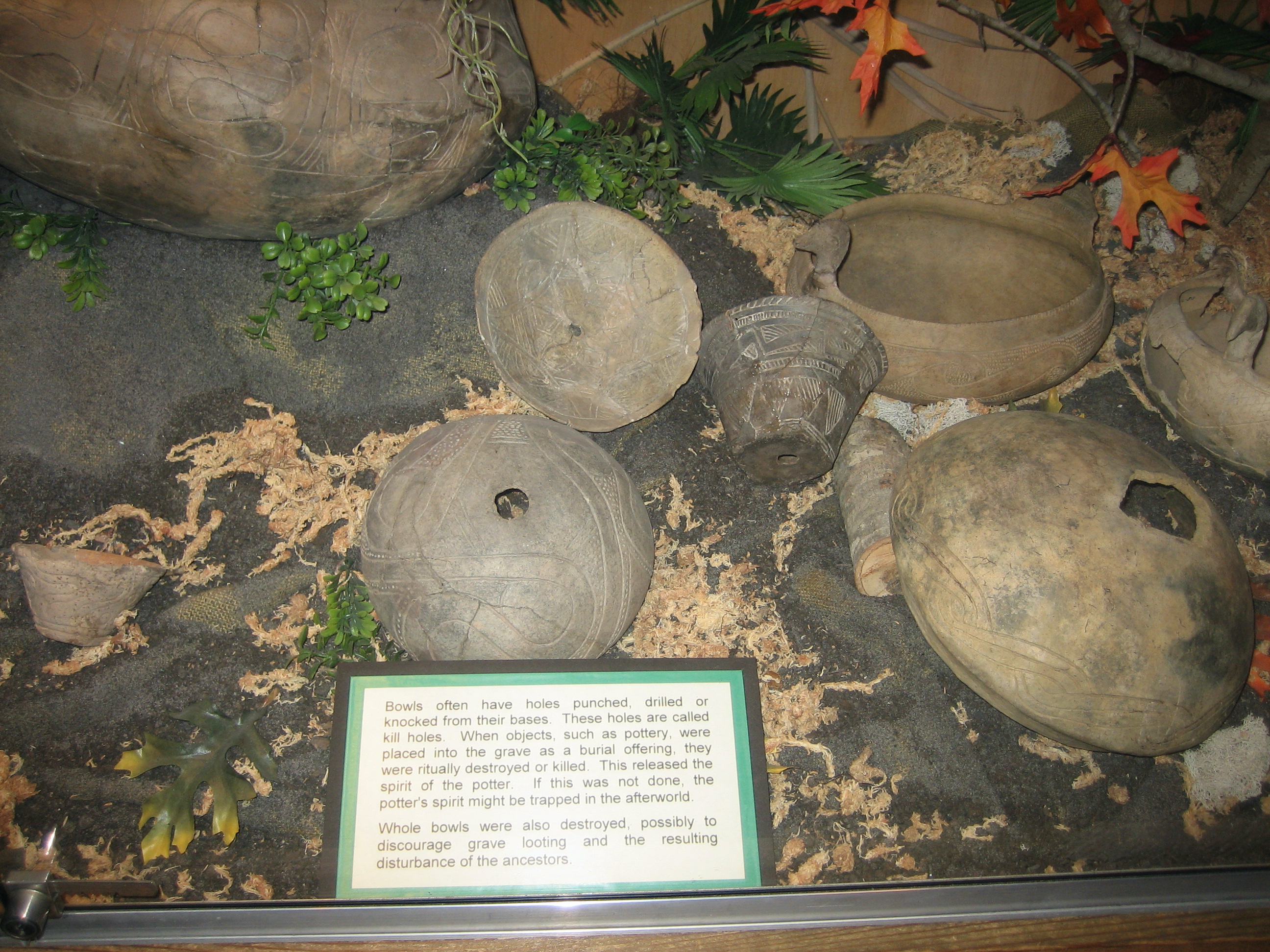
Mississippian culture pottery from the Fort Walton site

The Fort Walton culture was named by archaeologist Gordon Willey for the Fort Walton Mound site near Fort Walton Beach, Florida, based on his work at the site. Through more work in the area archaeologist have now come to believe the Ft. Walton site was actually built and used by people of the contemporaneous Pensacola culture. The peoples of the Ft. Walton culture used mostly sand, grit, grog, or combinations of these materials as tempering agents in their pottery, whereas the Pensacola culture peoples used the more typical Mississippian culture shell tempering for their pottery. Using this unique combination of sand/grit/grog tempering as its criterion Fort Walton culture is now defined within the geographical area stretching from the Aucilla River in the east to a Pensacola–Fort Walton transitional area around Choctawhatchee Bay in the west and north into the interior of south Alabama and Georgia, 107 miles (172 km) up the Apalachicola River and 50 miles (80 km) up the Chattahoochee River.

== History ==
Approximately 1000 to 1200 CE local Weeden Island peoples began adapting and adopting intensive maize agriculture, the building of platform mounds for ceremonial, political and religious purposes and making a new variety of ceramics, changes likely influenced by contact with the major Mississippian culture centers to the north and west. Early archaeologists thought that the Fort Walton culture represented the intrusion of peoples from Mexico or Mississippian cultures from the northwest replacing the indigenous Weeden Island peoples, but by the late 1970s this theory was generally discounted.

Layouts and locations for Fort Walton sites are similar to other Mississippian culture sites, with the exception of sites in the Tallahassee Hills area which because of the local geography are located around lakes and swamps instead of rivers. Settlement types include single family homesteads, multi family hamlets, small single mound centers, and large multimound centers. The hierarchical settlement patterns suggests the area may have had one or more paramount chiefdoms.

By the Late Fort Walton period increased contact with Lamar phase peoples from central Georgia saw another change in styles of decoration and manufacture of ceramics. This new phase is known as the Leon-Jefferson culture. This period sees the collapse of the chiefdoms as aboriginal populations declined following contact with European explorers and colonizers, such as the Hernando de Soto Expedition in 1539. The Fort Walton and later Leon-Jefferson peoples are the direct ancestors of the Apalachee peoples.

=== Local chronology ===
Period	Dates
Weeden Island Culture	4-500 - 1200 CE
Fort Walton culture	1200 - 1500 CE
Leon-Jefferson culture	1500 - 1704 CE
Spanish Mission Period	1633 -1704 CE
Creek-Seminole	1704 - 1850 CE

== Archaeology sites ==
The Lake Jackson Mounds site in Leon County is the largest known ceremonial center of the Fort Walton culture, although there are eight other known ceremonial sites in the Apalachee Province. It was occupied during the entire Fort Walton period, but abandoned at about 1500 CE when the capital of the chiefdom was moved to nearby Anhaica, the capital when the de Soto entrada encamped there in the winter of 1539. Another large site located nearby is the Velda Mound, which was occupied from approximately 1450 to 1625. Other sites include the Yon Mound and Village Site in Liberty County, and the Thick Greenbriar Site in Jackson County.
