= Leon-Jefferson culture =

Protohistoric Native American archaeological culture

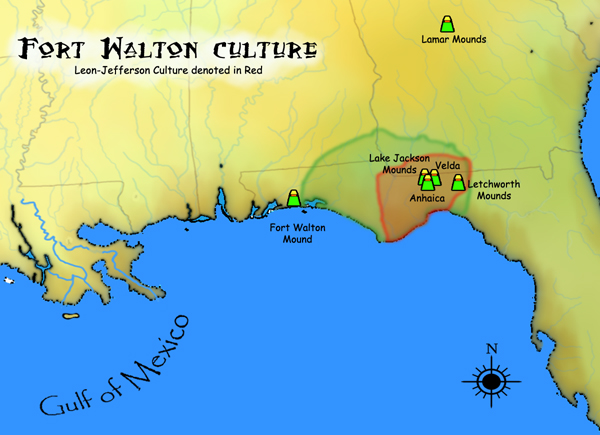
Geographic extent of Fort Walton and Leon-Jefferson Cultures

The Leon-Jefferson Culture is the term used by archaeologists for a protohistoric Native American archaeological culture that flourished in southeastern North America from approximately 1500–1704 CE and is associated with the historic Apalachee people. It was located in and named for the present day Leon and Jefferson counties in northern Florida of the Southeastern United States

== Local chronology ==
The cultural transformation from Late Fort Walton to Early Leon-Jefferson may have been brought about through contact with Lamar phase peoples from central Georgia. During this time period ceramic traditions change and styles of decoration and manufacture from central Georgia become incorporated into the local traditions associated with the Fort Walton culture. This period also represents the transformation of the Apalachee peoples of the Fort Walton tradition and the collapse of the chiefdom as aboriginal populations declined following contact with European explorers and colonizers. Early in the period larger settlements appear, possibly because of the influx of Lamar peoples, although they are still located in typical Fort Walton locations such as near ridge and hilltops and around water sources such as ponds and lakes. Later in the period populations begin to drop, most likely in response to the introduction of diseases introduced by Europeans such as the Hernando de Soto entrada which passed through the area in 1539. By the time of the Spanish Mission Period the villages are smaller and located around mission churches.

| Period | Dates |
|---|---|
| Weeden Island Culture | 4-500 - 1200 CE |
| Fort Walton Culture | 1200 - 1500 CE |
| Leon-Jefferson Culture | 1500 - 1704 CE |
| Spanish Mission Period | 1633 -1704 CE |
| Creek-Seminole | 1704 - 1850 CE |

=== Ceramics ===
Early in the Leon-Jefferson period ceramics are well-made vessels, using grit tempering rather than the more common Mississippian culture trait of using ground mussel shells. About 1450 CE distinctive central Georgian stamped and incised pottery begins to appear in the Apalachee area, probably representing trade or alliances with the powerful centers of central Georgia, centered on the Lamar Mounds and Village Site (now part of the Ocmulgee National Monument). By around 1600 local potters are making Lamar Phase styled vessels but continuing to use their own clay and/or grog as a tempering agent. The most common shapes for ceramic vessels at this time were bowls with outward flaring rims, very similar to Lamar style wares. As this period progresses the quality and craftmanship of ceramics deteriorates.

== Archaeological sites ==
Like other Mississippian peoples, Leon-Jefferson peoples had hierarchical settlement patterns, built ceremonial platform mounds and practiced intensive maize agriculture. Anhaica, near Tallahassee's city center, served as the capital of Apalachee Province and the Lake Jackson site 3 miles to the north was a Fort Walton period site and a major site associated with the Southeastern Ceremonial Complex.

The northwest Florida region also encompasses the Letchworth Mounds of Jefferson County as well as Tallahassee's Lake Jackson mound. It is generally defined as encompassing the Florida Panhandle east from the Ochlockonee River to the Aucilla River. Frequently, there are cultural differences between the inland groups who relied on the inland resources of what are now Leon and Jefferson counties and those who used coastal resources.

== See also ==
- South Appalachian Mississippian culture
- List of Mississippian sites
