= Georgian languages =

Georgian languages may refer to either of the following.

== Languages of the country Georgia in the Caucasus ==
- Languages of Georgia, all languages spoken in Georgia
- Kartvelian languages, a family of related languages spoken primarily in Georgia

== Languages of the U.S state Georgia ==
- Languages of Georgia (U.S. state)
