= Lincoln Hills, Columbus, Georgia =

Coordinates: 32°31′30″N 84°56′50″W

Lincoln Hills is a neighborhood located in Columbus, Georgia. The boundaries are generally acknowledged to be Veterans Parkway to the north, Miller Road and the Columbus Metropolitan Airport to the south, I-185 to the west and Moon Road to the east.
