= Demographics of Georgia =

Demographics in Georgia has two primary meanings:

- Demographics of Georgia (country), a country in the Caucasus
- Demographics of Georgia (U.S. state), a state in the United States of America
