= Columbus metropolitan area, Georgia =

Columbus metropolitan area
- Metropolitan statistical area Combined statistical area
- Columbus metropolitan statistical area Columbus–Auburn–Opelika, GA–AL combined statistical area
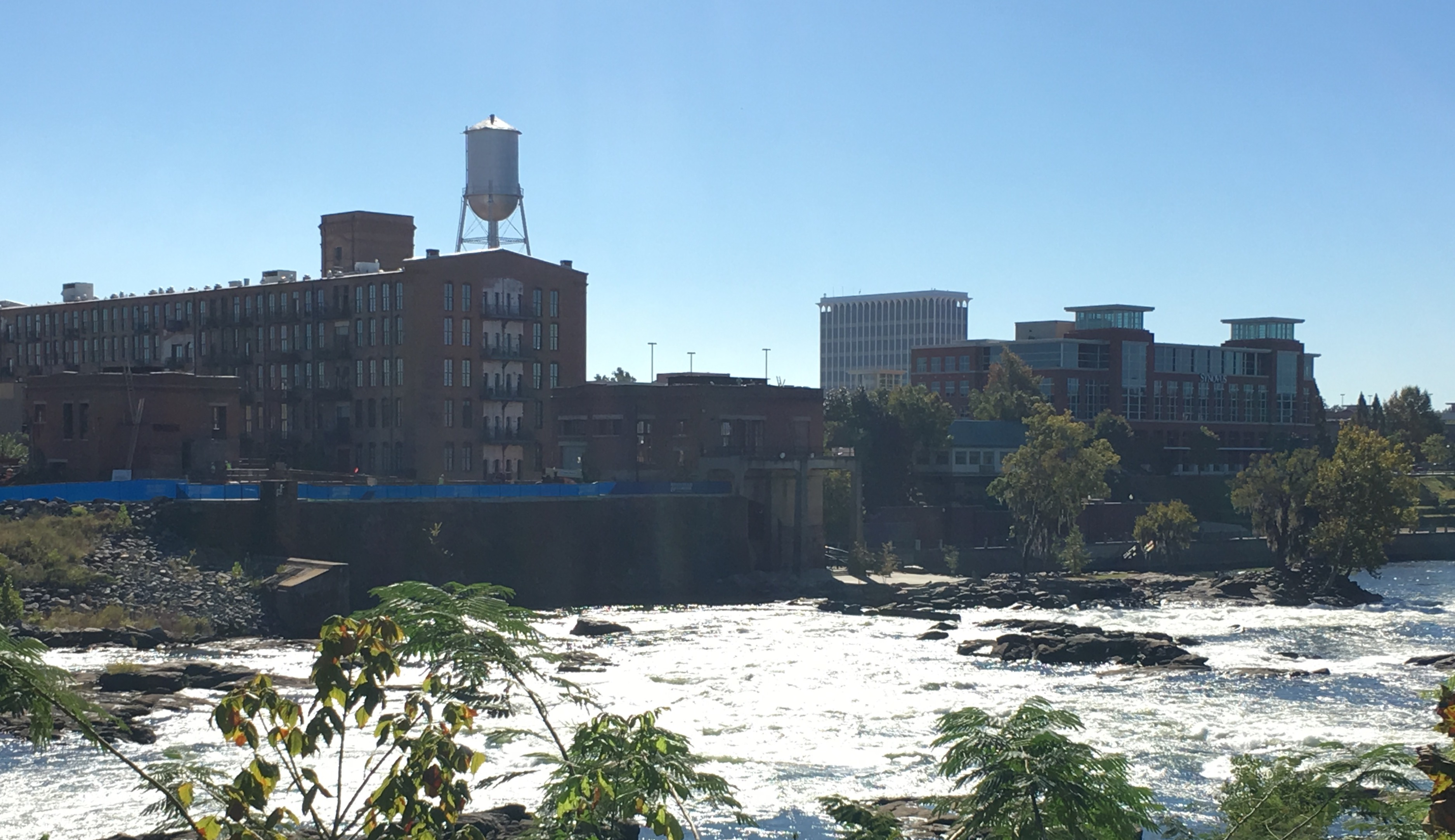
- Skyline of Columbus, Georgia
Columbus–Auburn–Opelika, GA–AL CSA
Columbus–Muscogee County
Columbus, GA–AL MSA
Auburn–Opelika, AL MSA
Alexander City, AL μSA
Fort Benning
- Country: United States
- State: Georgia; Alabama
- Largest city: Columbus, GA
- Other city: Phenix City, AL

Area
  - Total: 2,786.1 sq mi (7,216 km^{2})

Population (2020)
  - Total: 328,883
  - Density: 118.04/sq mi (45.577/km^{2})

GDP
  - Total: $25.294 billion (2022)
- Time zone: UTC−5 (EST)
  - Summer (DST): UTC−4 (EDT)
- Area codes: 706, 762, 334

The Columbus metropolitan area, officially the Columbus, GA–AL Metropolitan Statistical Area, and colloquially known as the Chattahoochee Valley, is a metropolitan statistical area consisting of six counties in the U.S. state of Georgia and one county in Alabama, anchored by the city of Columbus. It is the fourth most populous metro area in Georgia.

At the 2020 U.S. census, the Columbus area had a population of 328,883; in 2025, the U.S. Census Bureau estimated the Columbus MSA's population to be 324,830.

The Columbus metropolitan area is a component of the Columbus–Auburn–Opelika, GA–AL Combined Statistical Area, a trading and marketing region. It is split between the eastern time zone (the time zone of the Georgia metropolitan counties) and central time zone (the time zone of Russell County, Alabama). The Columbus metropolitan area is one of two metropolitan areas split between multiple time zones, with the other being the Chattanooga metropolitan area in Tennessee.

== Geography ==
Located in West Georgia, the metropolitan area consists of counties in both Georgia and Alabama: Chattahoochee, Harris, Marion, Muscogee, Stewart, and Talbot counties in Georgia; and Russell County, Alabama. Stewart and Talbot counties were added to the MSA in 2018, when the Office of Management and Budget revised the official area definition of the Columbus metropolitan area.

=== Communities ===
==== Places with more than 180,000 inhabitants ====
- Columbus, Georgia (principal city)

==== Places with 10,000 to 50,000 inhabitants ====
- Cusseta, Georgia (includes Fort Benning)
- Phenix City, Alabama

==== Places with 1,000 to 10,000 inhabitants ====
- Buena Vista, Georgia
- Hamilton, Georgia
- Ladonia, Alabama (census-designated place)
- Lumpkin, Georgia
- Manchester, Georgia (partial)
- Pine Mountain, Georgia (partial)
- Richland, Georgia
- West Point, Georgia (partial)

==== Places with less than 1,000 inhabitants ====
- Geneva, Georgia
- Hurtsboro, Alabama
- Junction City, Georgia
- Shiloh, Georgia
- Talbotton, Georgia
- Waverly Hall, Georgia
- Woodland, Georgia

==== Unincorporated places ====
- Box Springs, Georgia
- Cataula, Georgia
- Ellerslie, Georgia
- Fortson, Georgia
- Glenville, Alabama
- Juniper, Georgia
- Louvale, Georgia
- Midland, Georgia
- Omaha, Georgia

== Demographics ==
According to the 2000 United States census, there were 281,768 people, 103,982 households, and 72,632 families residing within the MSA. In 2010, its population grew to 296,506, and at the 2020 census, its population was 328,883; the 2022 U.S. census estimates numbered 324,110.

In 2000, the racial and ethnic makeup of the Columbus metropolitan area was 54.56% White, 40.21% African American, 0.40% Native American, 1.22% Asian, 0.14% Pacific Islander, 1.01% from other races, and 1.74% from two or more races. Hispanic or Latino people of any race were 4.02% of the population. According to the 2022 American Community Survey, the metropolitan area's racial and ethnic makeup was 43% White, 41% Black or African American, 2% Asian, 5% multiracial, and 8% Hispanic or Latino of any race.

In 2000, the median income for a household in the MSA was $35,262, and the median income for a family was $40,065. Males had a median income of $29,196 versus $22,834 for females. The per capita income for the MSA was $16,410. In 2022, the median household income was $54,106 with a per capita income of $30,287. An estimated 18.5% of the metropolitan population lived at or below the poverty line.

County	State	Seat	2025 estimate	2020 census	Change	Area	Density
Muscogee	Georgia	Columbus	202,171	206,922	−2.30%	221 sq mi (570 km^{2})	915/sq mi (353/km^{2})
Russell	Alabama	Phenix City	58,898	59,183	−0.48%	647 sq mi (1,680 km^{2})	91/sq mi (35/km^{2})
Harris	Georgia	Hamilton	37,280	34,668	+7.53%	473 sq mi (1,230 km^{2})	79/sq mi (30/km^{2})
Chattahoochee	Georgia	Cusseta	8,465	9,565	−11.50%	251 sq mi (650 km^{2})	34/sq mi (13/km^{2})
Marion	Georgia	Buena Vista	7,676	7,498	+2.37%	367 sq mi (950 km^{2})	21/sq mi (8/km^{2})
Talbot	Georgia	Talbotton	5,709	5,733	−0.42%	395 sq mi (1,020 km^{2})	14/sq mi (6/km^{2})
Stewart	Georgia	Lumpkin	4,631	5,314	−12.85%	464 sq mi (1,200 km^{2})	10/sq mi (4/km^{2})
Total			324,830	328,883	−1.23%	2,818 sq mi (7,300 km^{2})	115/sq mi (45/km^{2})

== Transportation ==
=== Air ===
- Columbus Airport

=== Interstate ===
- Interstate 85
- Interstate 185

=== U. S. routes ===
- U.S. Route 27
- U.S. Route 27 Alternate
- U.S. Route 80
- U.S. Route 280
- U.S. Route 431

== See also ==
- Georgia census statistical areas
- Alabama census statistical areas
