= Demographics of Georgia (U.S. state) =

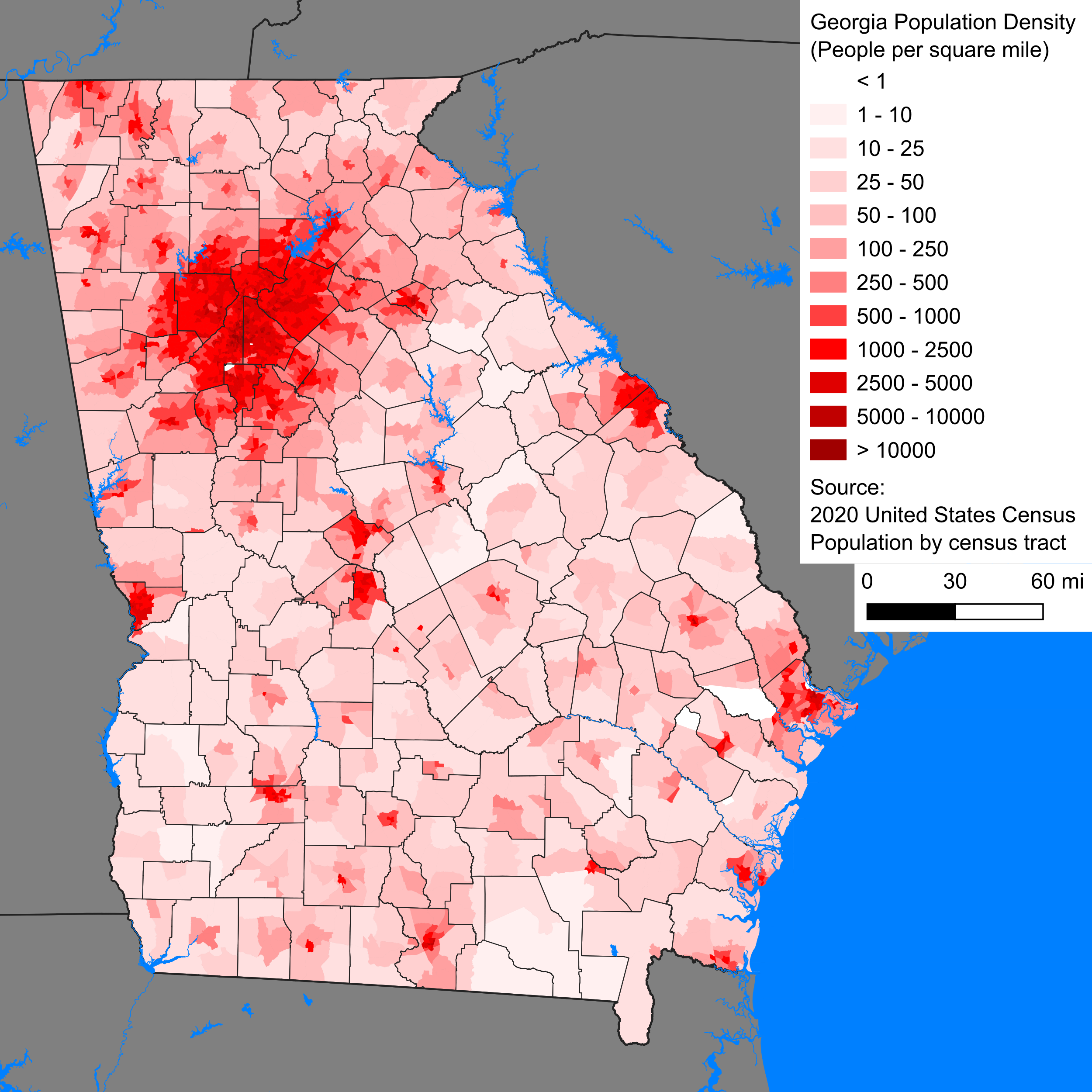
A map of Georgia detailing the population density and distribution (2020)

Historical population
| Census | Pop. | Note | %± |
|---|---|---|---|
| 1790 | 82,548 | | — |
| 1800 | 162,686 | | 97.1% |
| 1810 | 251,407 | | 54.5% |
| 1820 | 340,989 | | 35.6% |
| 1830 | 516,823 | | 51.6% |
| 1840 | 691,392 | | 33.8% |
| 1910 | 2,609,121 | | — |
| 1920 | 2,895,832 | | 11.0% |
| 1930 | 2,908,506 | | 0.4% |
| 1940 | 3,123,723 | | 7.4% |
| 1950 | 3,444,578 | | 10.3% |
| 1960 | 3,943,116 | | 14.5% |
| 1970 | 4,589,575 | | 16.4% |
| 1980 | 5,463,105 | | 19.0% |
| 1990 | 6,478,216 | | 18.6% |
| 2000 | 8,186,453 | | 26.4% |
| 2010 | 9,687,653 | | 18.3% |
| 2020 | 10,711,908 | | 10.6% |
| 2025 (est.) | 11,302,748 | | 5.5% |
Sources: 1910–2020, 2025

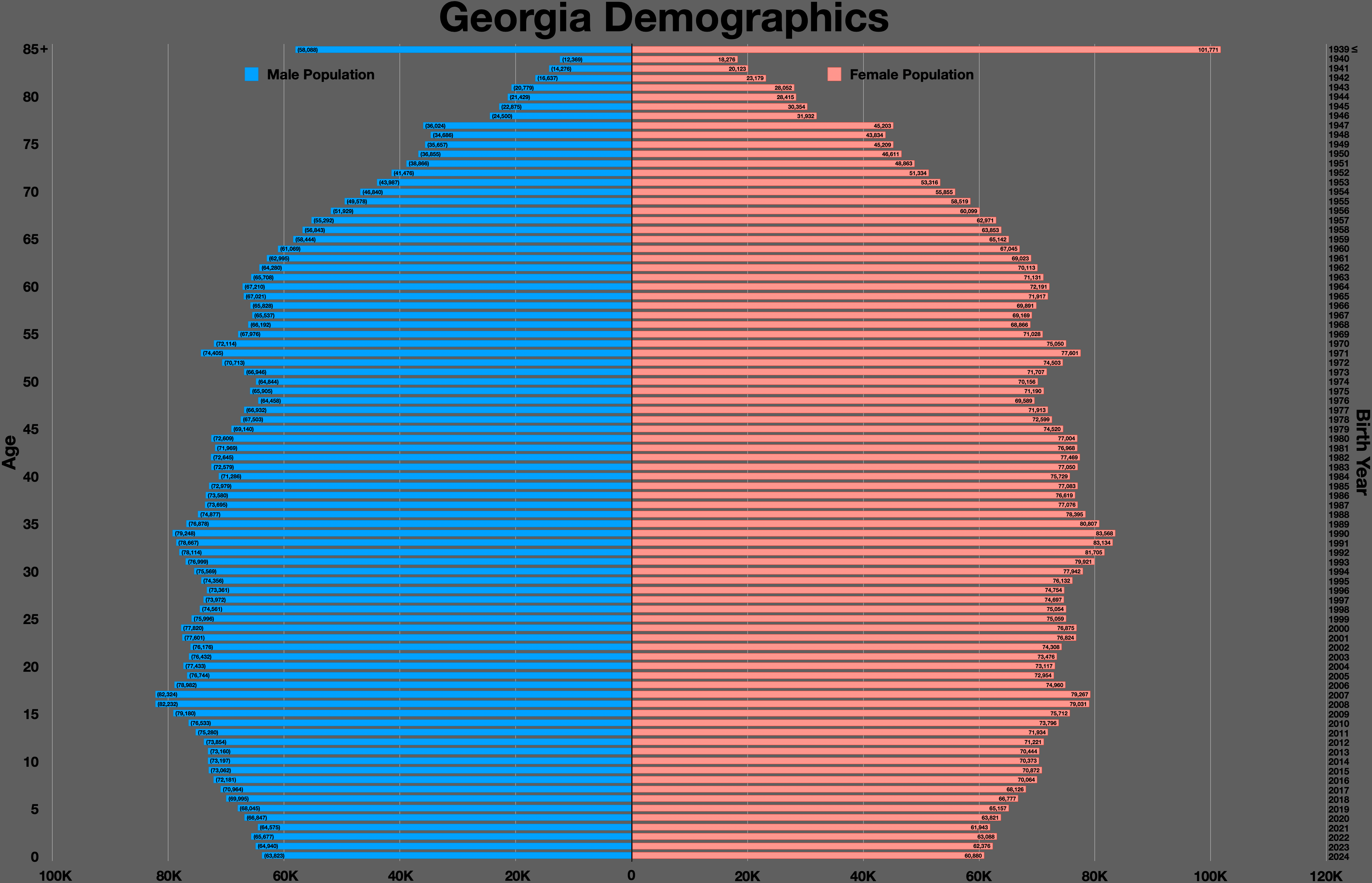
Georgia population pyramid

Georgia is a South Atlantic U.S. state with a population of 10,711,908 according to the 2020 United States census, or just over 3% of the U.S. population. The majority of the state's population is concentrated within Metro Atlanta, although other highly populated regions include: West Central and East Central Georgia; West, Central, and East Georgia; and Coastal Georgia; and their Athens, Columbus, Macon and Warner Robins, Augusta, Savannah, Hinesville, and Brunswick metropolitan statistical areas.

== Race and ethnicity ==
Since the beginning of the 21st century, Georgia's population has experienced diversification with the decline of its non-Hispanic white population. This diversification has reflected nationwide trends of the United States' population identifying with other races and ethnicities at the 2020 census. In 2020, the state's Black and African American population increased by 13%, remaining the second-largest racial and ethnic group; the state's Asian population grew by 53% and its Hispanic and Latino American population increased by 32%. In 2020, the state's foreign born population was 10.4%.

The leading countries of origin for immigrants included Mexico, accounting for 25.7 percent of the total immigrant population, followed by India (8.6%), Korea (4.1%), Vietnam (3.5%), and Jamaica (3.2%).

Georgia experienced the second highest growth of its Asian population in the U.S. from 1990 to 2000, more than doubling in that decade. The state also has a significant and diverse Hispanic population, particularly Mexicans and Puerto Ricans. Most of the recent influx of Hispanic, Asian, Caribbean, and Sub-Saharan African residents live in the diverse Atlanta metropolitan area, while the rest of Georgia is mostly made up of Blacks and Whites. In addition, according to census estimates, Georgia ranks third in the nation for the percentage of its total population that is African American, following Mississippi and Louisiana, and it has the third largest number of Black residents after New York and Florida. From 2006 to 2007, Georgia saw the largest numerical increase in its Black population, adding 84,000 people.

The settlement of many Scottish Americans, English Americans, and Scotch-Irish Americans in the mountains and piedmont, along with English Americans and African Americans in coastal areas, has greatly shaped the culture of the state, especially in food, language, and music. In the 18th century, a significant number of Africans were brought to the coastal regions from rice-growing areas in West Africa, which led to the emergence of the Gullah-Geechee language and culture among African Americans in the Lowcountry. They have a distinct heritage where African traditions in food, religion, and culture have been preserved much more than in any other Black American community. Their culinary practices became a key part of the overall cooking traditions in the Lowcountry.

=== Historical ===
| Year | Population | White | % W | Black | % B |
|---|---|---|---|---|---|
| 1750 | 2120 | N/A | 80.2% | N/A | 19.8% |
| 1753 | 3447 | N/A | 69.1% | N/A | 30.2% |
| 1756 | 6335 | N/A | 70.8% | N/A | 29.2% |

=== Current ===
Racial and ethnic composition as of the 2020 census
| Race and ethnicity | Alone | Total |
|---|---|---|
| White (non-Hispanic) | 50.1% | 53.2% |
| African American (non-Hispanic) | 30.6% | 32.3% |
| Hispanic or Latino (Note: Persons of Hispanic or Latino origin are not distinguished between total and partial ancestry.) | — | 10.5% |
| Asian | 4.4% | 5.2% |
| Native American | 0.2% | 1.5% |
| Pacific Islander | 0.1% | 0.1% |
| Other | 0.5% | 1.2% |

Georgia – Racial and ethnic composition Note: the US Census treats Hispanic/Latino as an ethnic category. This table excludes Latinos from the racial categories and assigns them to a separate category. Hispanics/Latinos may be of any race.
| Race / Ethnicity (NH = Non-Hispanic) | Pop 1980 | Pop 1990 | Pop 2000 | Pop 2010 | Pop 2020 | % 1980 | % 1990 | % 2000 | % 2010 | % 2020 |
|---|---|---|---|---|---|---|---|---|---|---|
| White alone (NH) | 3,914,084 | 4,543,425 | 5,128,661 | 5,413,920 | 5,362,156 | 71.65% | 70.13% | 62.65% | 55.88% | 50.06% |
| Black or African American alone (NH) | 1,448,137 | 1,737,165 | 2,331,465 | 2,910,800 | 3,278,119 | 26.51% | 26.82% | 28.48% | 30.05% | 30.60% |
| Native American or Alaska Native alone (NH) | 7,614 | 12,621 | 17,670 | 21,279 | 20,375 | 0.14% | 0.19% | 0.22% | 0.22% | 0.19% |
| Asian alone (NH) | 24,368 | 73,725 | 171,513 | 311,692 | 475,680 | 0.45% | 1.14% | 2.10% | 3.22% | 4.44% |
| Native Hawaiian or Pacific Islander alone (NH) | x (Note: included in the Asian category in the 1980 Census) | x | 3,278 | 5,152 | 6,101 | x | x | 0.04% | 0.05% | 0.06% |
| Other race alone (NH) | 7,642 | 2,358 | 11,275 | 19,141 | 55,887 | 0.14% | 0.04% | 0.14% | 0.20% | 0.52% |
| Mixed race or Multiracial (NH) | x (Note: not an option in the 1980 Census) | x | 87,364 | 151,980 | 390,133 | x | x | 1.07% | 1.57% | 3.64% |
| Hispanic or Latino (any race) | 61,260 | 108,922 | 435,227 | 853,689 | 1,123,457 | 1.12% | 1.68% | 5.32% | 8.81% | 10.49% |
| Total | 5,463,105 | 6,478,216 | 8,186,453 | 9,687,653 | 10,711,908 | 100.00% | 100.00% | 100.00% | 100.00% | 100.00% |

==== 2025 American Community Survey one-year estimates ====
| Racial Makeup of Georgia (2025): 1. White alone (49.4%); 2. Black alone (30.6%); 3. Native American alone (0.45%); 4. Asian Alone (5.20%); 5. Pacific Islander Alone (0.08%); 6. Other race alone (5.13%); 7. Two or more races (9.12%) | Racial/Ethnic Makeup of Georgia excluding Hispanics from racial categories (2025); NH=Non-Hispanic: 1. White NH (47.1%); 2. Black NH (30.2%); 3. Native American NH (0.15%); 4. Asian NH (5.13%); 5. Pacific Islander NH (0.07%); 6. Other race NH (0.56%); 7. Two or more races NH (4.83%); 8. Hispanic Any Race (12.0%) | Racial Makeup of Hispanics in Georgia (2025): 1. White alone (19.3%); 2. Black alone (3.37%); 3. Native American alone (2.58%); 4. Asian Alone (0.59%); 5. Pacific Islander Alone (0.13%); 6. Other race alone (38.2%); 7. Two or more races (35.8%) |

According to the 2020 U.S. census, the racial and ethnic makeup of the population was 50.1% non-Hispanic white, 32.6% African American, 4.4% Asian American, 0.3% American Indian and Alaska Native, 0.1% Native Hawaiian and other Pacific Islander, and 10.5% Hispanic and Latino American of any race.

Internal Georgia state government population estimates project that the State of Georgia was 50.26% Non-Hispanic White on July 1, 2024 and was 49.34% Non-Hispanic White on July 1, 2025. According to that data, Georgia became majority-minority on Oct 12 2024, 1:10 a.m.: 49.9% Non-Hispanic White to 50.1% all other races.

But ACS Data disagrees. It indicates that in 2010, with a population of 9,687,653, Non-Hispanic Whites were 55.9% of the Georgia state population and African Americans were 30.5%. ACS Data indicates that the percentage of Non-Hispanic White in subsequent years was: 2018: 52.225%; 2019: 51.822%; 2020: 52.092%; 2021: 50.226%; 2022: 49.626%; 2023: 48.658%; 2024: 48.009%. According to that data, Georgia crossed into majority-minority status on November 15, 2021.

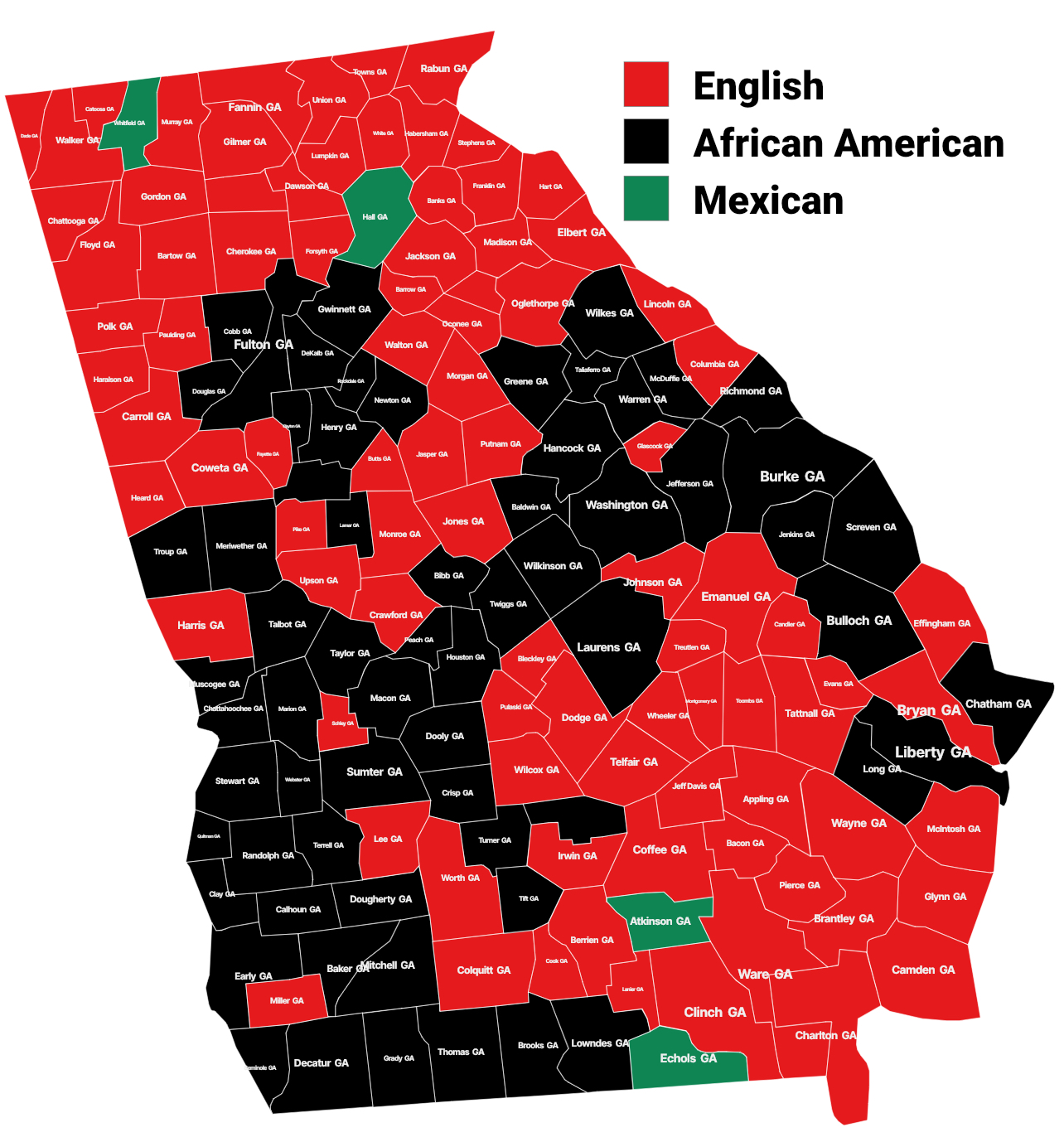
Georgia ancestry map

According to data from 2010, the largest ancestry groups were: 10.8% American (mostly British descent), 9.5% Irish, 8.9% English, 8.8% Hispanics and Latinos and 8.2% German. According to the American Community Survey in 2023, the largest ancestral groups were 10.1% English, 6.6% Irish, 6.1% German, 5.5% Mexican, 2.3% Italian, 1.7% Indian, 1.7% Scottish, 1.1% Puerto Rican, 1% French, 1% Polish, 0.9% Scotch-Irish, 0.9% Chinese, 0.7% Korean, 0.7% Vietnamese, 0.5% Nigerian, and 0.4% Norwegian.

In the 1980 census, 1,584,303 Georgians cited that they were of English ancestry out of a total state population of 3,994,817 making them 40% of the state, and the largest ethnic group at the time. Many people today who claim to have "American" ancestry are actually of English or Scots-Irish descent. However, due to the long-standing presence of their families in the region, often dating back to the colonial era, many prefer to identify solely as having "American" ancestry or may not be aware of their specific ancestral roots. Their ancestry primarily goes back to the original Thirteen Colonies and for this reason many of them today simply claim "American" ancestry, though they are of predominantly English ancestry.

In 2004, 7.7% of its population was reported as under 5 years of age, 26.4% under 18, and 9.6% were 65 or older. Also as of 2004, females made up approximately 50.6% of the population, and African Americans made up approximately 29.6% of the state's population.

=== White and European Americans ===
White and European Americans have historically composed the predominant racial and ethnic composition for the state. Primarily descending from British, Irish, English, and German ancestry, the state's White and European American population have shared a common, White Southern and Protestant culture with Americans of neighboring states.

=== Black and African Americans ===
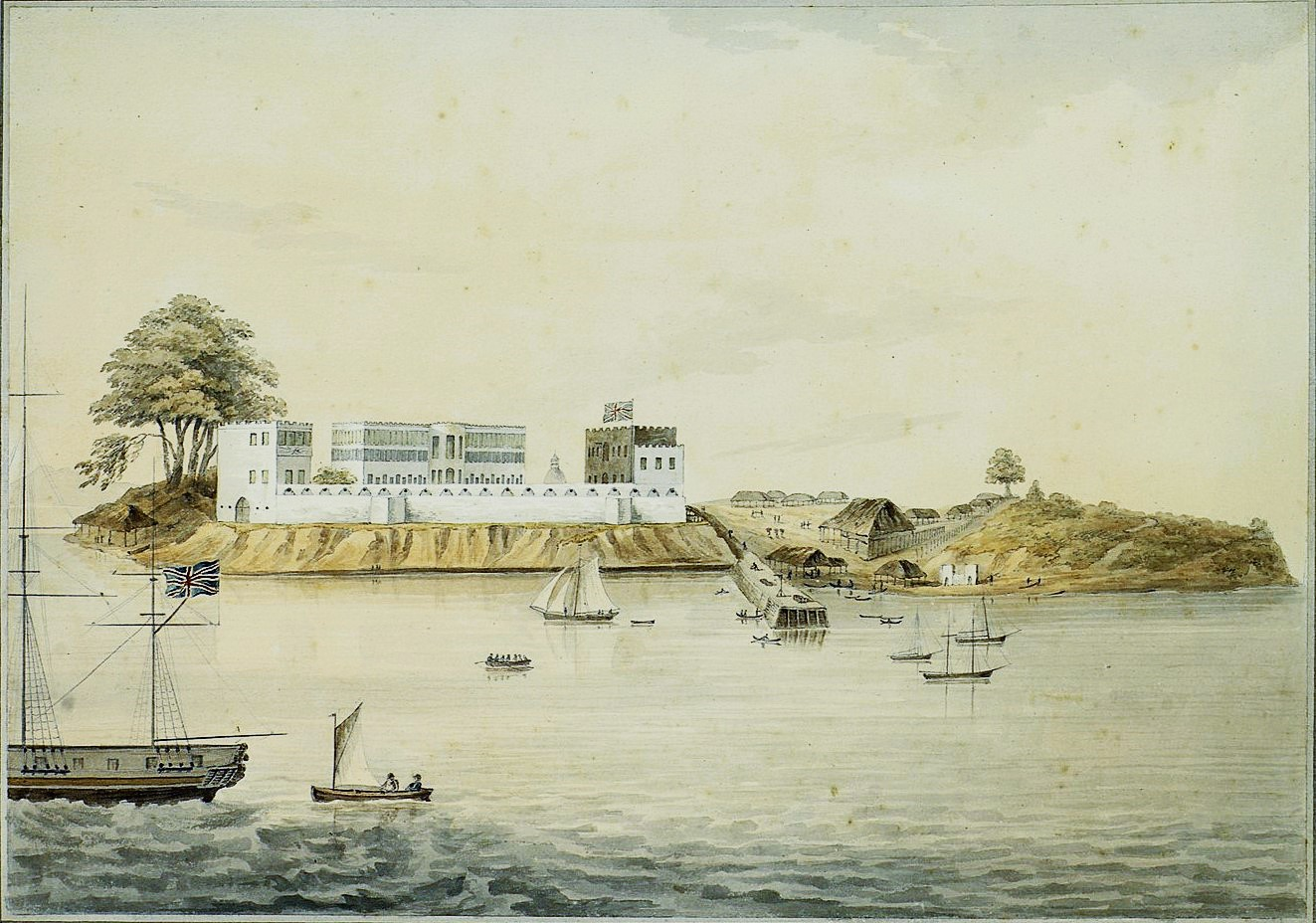
Bunce Island, a historical slave port where the ancestors of many Gullah departed to the Lowcountry

Historically, about half of Georgia's population was composed of African Americans who, prior to the American Civil War, were almost exclusively enslaved. The Great Migration of blacks from the rural South to the industrial North from 1914–1970 reduced the African American population. Since the New Great Migration of African Americans into the South, Black and African Americans grew to becoming the second-largest race and ethnicity in the state. Within Atlanta and its metropolitan statistical area, the state's black population forms the largest residential composition; there are also large black populations in Middle, East, West, and Southwest Georgia, with the black population in the Southwest region forming part of the Black Belt in the American South.

Having a concentration of African-descended peoples in Southeast Georgia and the Lower Coastal Plain, the descendants of enslaved Africans led to the development of the Gullah-Geechee people and language. In the creolization of Lowcountry culture, their foodways became an integral part of all cooking in the Lowcountry.

Culturally, black Georgians have shared the dialects of Southern American English, African American Vernacular English, and African American English with the remainder of the Black Southerner population. Gullah-Geechee Georgians also speak the Gullah language. In terms of religious affiliation and observance, the black Georgian communities have identified with African American Protestantism or Black Catholicism. Since the late 18th century, most black Georgian Protestants have affiliated with the Baptist tradition through the National Baptist Convention, National Baptist Convention of America, Progressive National Baptist Convention, and National Primitive Baptist Convention.

=== Hispanic and Latino Americans ===
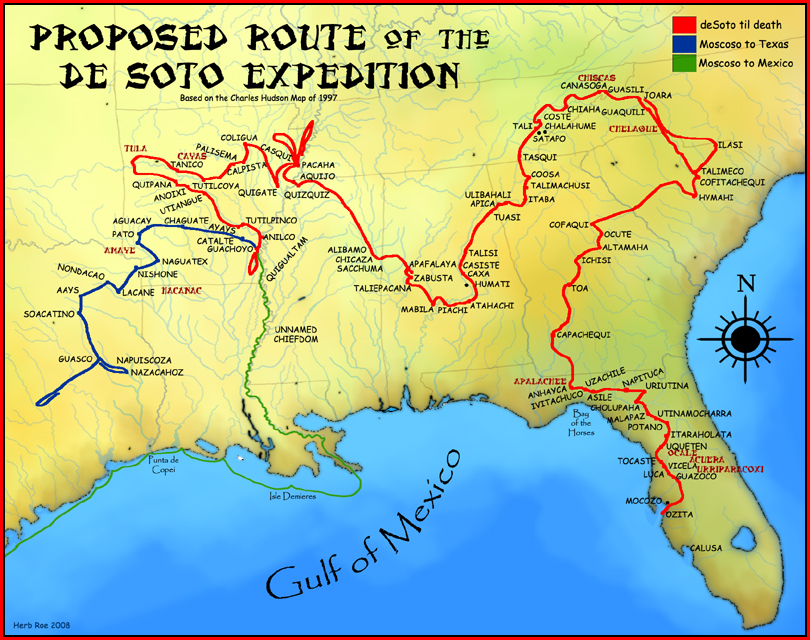
Proposed route of the Hernando de Soto expedition

Georgia has had a growing Hispanic and Latino American population since the beginning of the 21st century, although there has been a historically minor Hispanic presence in present-day Southwest, Southeast and Coastal Georgia through the Spanish missions and initial settlement. During Spanish colonization of the Americas, following Hernando de Soto's expedition, explorers arrived at the territories of the Coosa chiefdom in Northwest Georgia, but none successfully established colonies.

As of 2022, most Hispanics and Latinos in Georgia are of Mexican ancestry. Among its Hispanic and Latino population, the majority have the common religious tradition of Catholicism, which has been increasing statewide. According to 2018 U.S. Census Bureau estimates, the majority of Hispanics and Latinos in Georgia were of Mexican descent (58.1%) followed by those of Puerto Rican descent (10.1%), Guatemalan descent (6.3%), Salvadoran descent (4.8%), Cuban descent (3.4%), Colombian descent (3.1%), Honduran descent (2.5%), Dominican descent (2.2%), Venezuelan descent (1.4%), Peruvian descent (1.2%), Spanish descent (1.2%), and those of other Hispanic ethnicity or of mixed Hispanic ethnicity (5.7%).

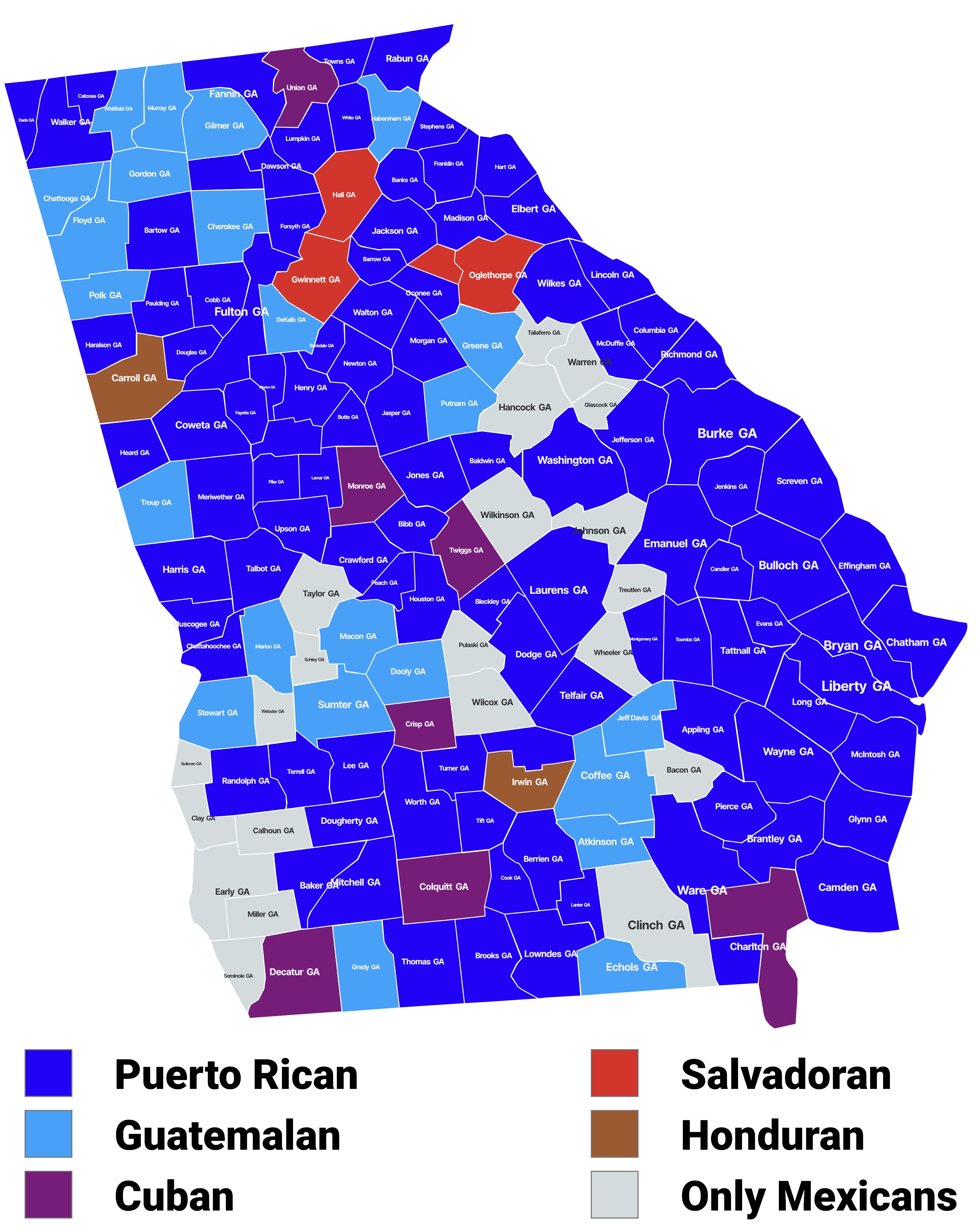
Largest Hispanic ancestry in Georgia besides Mexican, per the 2020 census

=== Native American ===
Native Americans were once the predominant ethnicity in the present-day U.S. state of Georgia, before European colonization. Since the decline of Georgia's Native American population due to colonialism and diseases from the Old World, alongside relocation, its constituency has remained small. Numbering 34,485 individuals, of which 70.5% belonged to federally recognized tribes as of 2018, the largest recognized tribe was the Cherokee (5,950 individuals) followed by Chippewa (727), Navajo (502), Sioux (347), and Alaska Natives (76).

=== Asian American ===
The Asian American population in Georgia is diverse and growing, and as of 2018 with the largest group being that of Indian descent (32.6% of Asians) followed by those of Chinese (excluding Taiwan) descent (15.0%), Vietnamese descent (13.8%), Korean descent (12.2%), Filipino descent (6.0%), Pakistani descent (3.8%), Nepalese descent (2.4%), Japanese descent (2.1%), Burmese descent (1.9%), Hmong descent (1.5%), Bangladeshi descent (1.3%), Cambodian descent (1.1%), Thai descent (1.0%), and those of other Asian ethnicity or of mixed Asian ethnicity (5.3%).

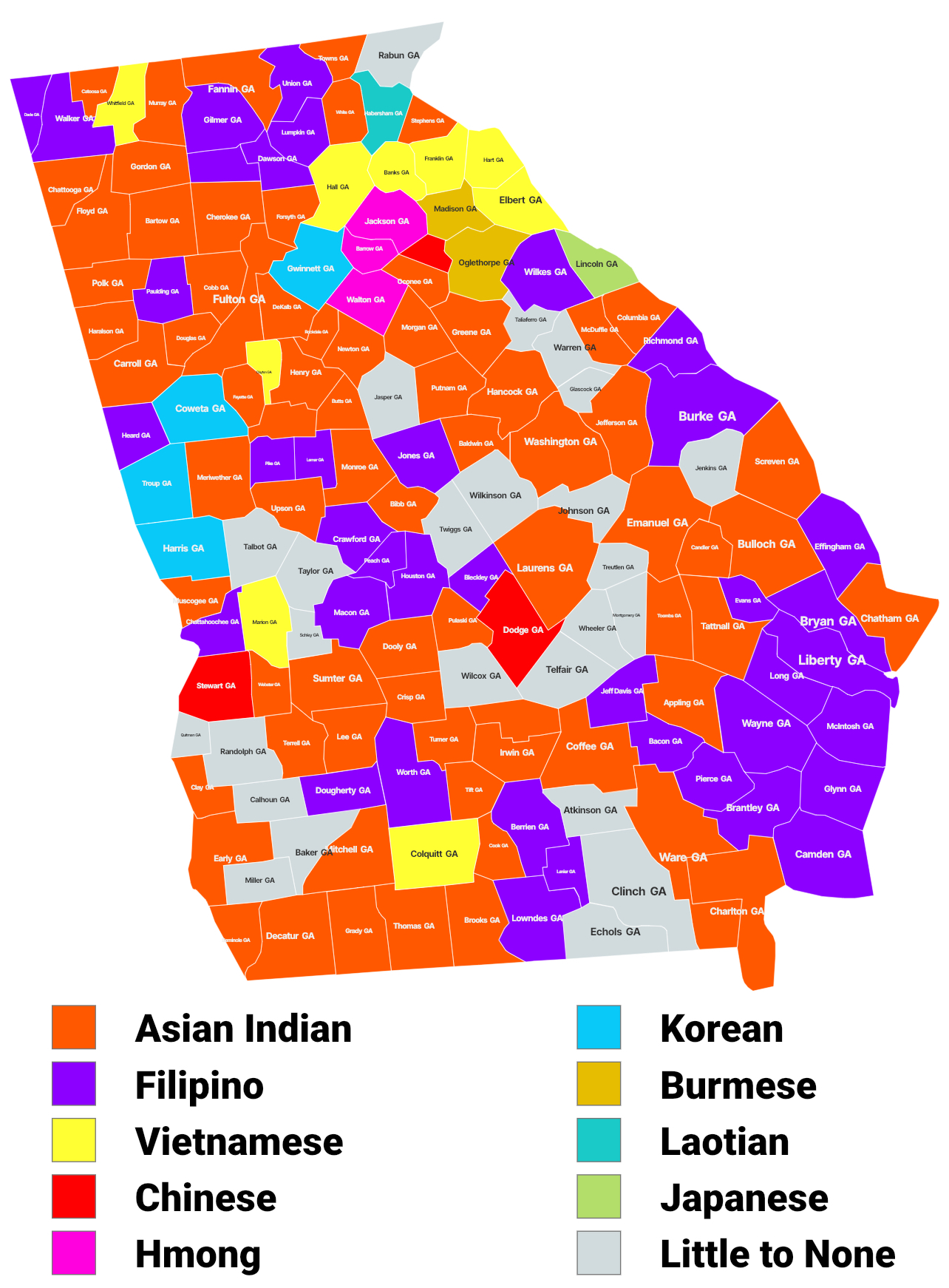
Largest Asian alone or in any combination ethnic origin in Georgia, per the 2020 census

=== Ancestries ===
| Ancestry by origin | Number | % |
|---|---|---|
| Afghan | 1,944 | |
| Albanian | 1,715 | |

== Vital statistics ==
Source: Centers for Disease Control and Prevention (CDC)

| Year | Population | Live births | Deaths | Natural change | Crude birth rate (per 1,000) | Crude death rate (per 1,000) | Natural change (per 1,000) | Crude migration change (per 1,000) |
|---|---|---|---|---|---|---|---|---|
| 1999 | 7,788,240 | 126,717 | 62,028 | 64,689 | 16.27 | 7.96 | 8.31 | 47.36 |
| 2000 | 8,227,303 | 132,644 | 63,870 | 68,774 | 16.12 | 7.76 | 8.36 | 4.61 |
| 2001 | 8,377,038 | 133,526 | 64,485 | 69,041 | 15.94 | 7.70 | 8.24 | –0.91 |
| 2002 | 8,508,256 | 133,300 | 65,449 | 67,851 | 15.66 | 7.69 | 7.97 | 7.75 |
| 2003 | 8,622,793 | 135,979 | 66,478 | 69,501 | 15.77 | 7.71 | 8.06 | 9.64 |
| 2004 | 8,769,252 | 138,849 | 65,818 | 73,031 | 15.83 | 7.51 | 8.32 | 11.96 |
| 2005 | 8,925,922 | 142,200 | 66,736 | 75,464 | 15.93 | 7.48 | 8.45 | 13.16 |
| 2006 | 9,155,813 | 148,633 | 67,808 | 80,825 | 16.23 | 7.41 | 8.83 | 18.43 |
| 2007 | 9,349,988 | 151,137 | 68,331 | 82,806 | 16.17 | 7.31 | 8.86 | 13.74 |
| 2008 | 9,504,843 | 146,603 | 69,640 | 76,963 | 15.43 | 7.33 | 8.10 | 5.17 |
| 2009 | 9,620,846 | 141,377 | 69,712 | 71,665 | 14.70 | 7.25 | 7.45 | 2.82 |
| 2010 | 9,712,209 | 133,947 | 71,263 | 62,684 | 13.80 | 7.34 | 6.46 | 2.85 |
| 2011 | 9,803,630 | 132,409 | 71,248 | 61,161 | 13.51 | 7.27 | 6.24 | 3.47 |
| 2012 | 9,903,580 | 130,280 | 72,847 | 57,433 | 13.16 | 7.36 | 5.80 | 4.74 |
| 2013 | 9,975,592 | 128,748 | 75,088 | 53,660 | 12.91 | 7.53 | 5.38 | 4.16 |
| 2014 | 10,071,204 | 130,946 | 76,887 | 54,059 | 13.00 | 7.63 | 5.37 | 4.38 |
| 2015 | 10,183,353 | 131,404 | 79,942 | 51,462 | 12.90 | 7.85 | 5.06 | 5.44 |
| 2016 | 10,308,442 | 130,042 | 81,428 | 48,614 | 12.62 | 7.90 | 4.72 | 7.58 |
| 2017 | 10,417,031 | 129,243 | 83,098 | 46,145 | 12.41 | 7.98 | 4.43 | 5.16 |
| 2018 | 10,519,389 | 126,172 | 85,202 | 40,970 | 11.99 | 8.10 | 3.90 | 4.72 |
| 2019 | 10,628,020 | 126,371 | 85,814 | 40,557 | 11.89 | 8.07 | 3.82 | 6.33 |
| 2020 | 10,732,888 | 122,473 | 103,075 | 19,398 | 11.41 | 9.60 | 1.81 | 8.16 |
| 2021 | 10,792,060 | 124,073 | 112,272 | 11,801 | 11.50 | 10.40 | 1.09 | 4.67 |
| 2022 | 10,931,805 | 126,130 | 102,342 | 23,788 | 11.54 | 9.38 | 2.16 | |
| 2023 | 11,064,432 | 125,120 | 96,527 | 28,593 | 11.30 | 8.75 | 2.55 | |
| 2024 | | 126,437 | 96,748 | 29,689 | 11.40 | 8.77 | 2.63 | |
| 2025 | 11,302,748 | 125,176 | 97,329 | 27,847 | | | | |

Note: Births in table don't add up, because Hispanics are counted both by their ethnicity and by their race, giving a higher overall number.

Live Births by Single Race/Ethnicity of Mother
| Race | 2014 | 2015 | 2016 | 2017 | 2018 | 2019 | 2020 | 2021 | 2022 | 2023 | 2024 |
|---|---|---|---|---|---|---|---|---|---|---|---|
| White | 60,104 (45.9%) | 60,328 (45.9%) | 57,971 (44.6%) | 56,985 (44.1%) | 55,676 (44.1%) | 54,850 (43.4%) | 52,717 (43.0%) | 53,675 (43.3%) | 53,638 (42.5%) | 52,541 (42.0%) | 53,236 (42.1%) |
| Black | 47,909 (36.6%) | 47,734 (36.3%) | 44,408 (34.1%) | 44,447 (34.4%) | 43,746 (34.7%) | 43,710 (34.6%) | 42,373 (34.6%) | 41,887 (33.7%) | 42,042 (33.3%) | 41,118 (32.9%) | 39,320 (31.1%) |
| Asian | 6,519 (5.0%) | 6,468 (4.9%) | 5,879 (4.5%) | 6,039 (4.7%) | 5,768 (4.6%) | 5,809 (4.6%) | 5,579 (4.6%) | 5,432 (4.4%) | 5,640 (4.5%) | 5,719 (4.6%) | 6,023 (4.7%) |
| American Indian | 292 (0.2%) | 298 (0.2%) | 125 (0.1%) | 223 (0.2%) | 206 (0.2%) | 186 (0.2%) | 115 (0.1%) | 123 (0.1%) | 104 (0.1%) | 102 (0.1%) | 113 (0.1%) |
| Hispanic (any race) | 17,442 (13.3%) | 17,836 (13.6%) | 17,957 (13.8%) | 17,954 (13.9%) | 17,432 (13.8%) | 18,426 (14.6%) | 18,415 (15.0%) | 19,480 (15.7%) | 21,202 (16.8%) | 22,003 (17.6%) | 24,135 (19.1%) |
| Total | 130,946 (100%) | 131,404 (100%) | 130,042 (100%) | 129,243 (100%) | 126,172 (100%) | 126,371 (100%) | 122,473 (100%) | 124,073 (100%) | 126,130 (100%) | 125,120 (100%) | 126,437 (100%) |

- Since 2016, data for births of White Hispanic origin are not collected, but included in one Hispanic group; persons of Hispanic origin may be of any race.

== Languages ==
Top 10 non-English languages spoken in Georgia
| Language | Percentage of population (as of 2010) |
|---|---|
| Spanish | 7.42% |
| Korean | 0.51% |
| Vietnamese | 0.44% |
| French | 0.42% |
| Chinese (including Mandarin) | 0.38% |
| German | 0.29% |
| Hindi | 0.23% |
| Niger-Congo languages of West Africa (Ibo, Kru, and Yoruba) | 0.21% |
| Gujarati | 0.18% |
| Portuguese and French Creole (tied) | 0.16% |

In 2010, 87.35% (7,666,663) of Georgia residents age 5 and older spoke English at home as a primary language, while 7.42% (651,583) spoke Spanish, 0.51% (44,702) Korean, 0.44% (38,244) Vietnamese, 0.42% (36,679) French, 0.38% (33,009) Chinese (which includes Mandarin,) and German was spoken as a main language by 0.29% (23,351) of the population over the age of five. In total, 12.65% (1,109,888) of Georgia's population age 5 and older spoke a mother language other than English.

== LGBTQ community ==
Georgia's lesbian, gay, bisexual and transgender community has had a long history. The state's capital has one of the highest LGBTQ populations per capita. It ranked third of all major cities, behind San Francisco and slightly behind Seattle, with 12.8% of the city's total population identifying themselves as gay, lesbian, or bisexual according to studies in 2009 and 2007. According to the 2000 United States census (revised in 2004), Atlanta had the twelfth highest proportion of single-person households nationwide among cities of 100,000 or more residents, which was at 38.5%.

== Religion ==
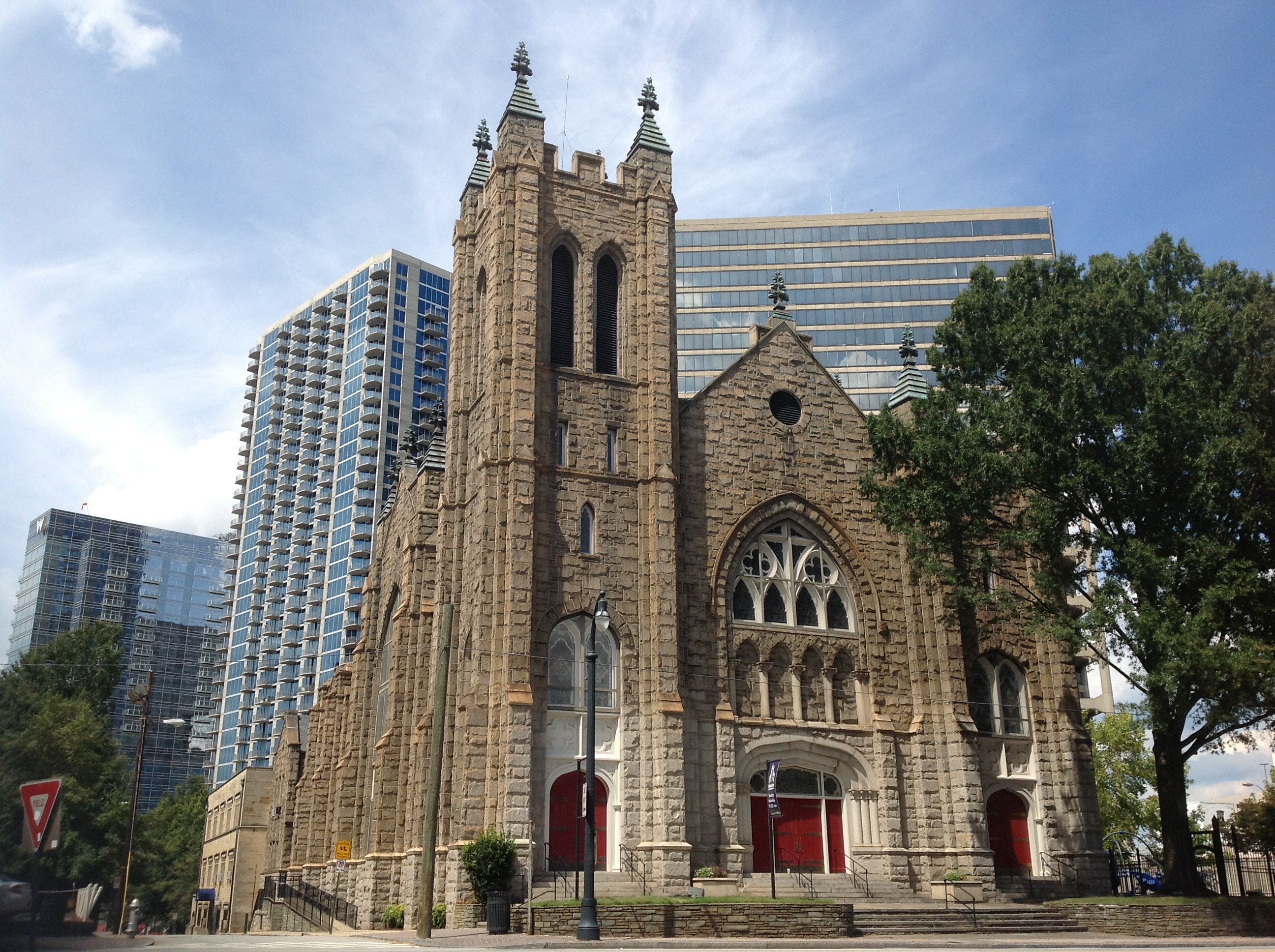
First Methodist Episcopal Church South, Atlanta, Georgia

As a state within the Bible Belt, Georgia has historically been a relatively religious state. Pre-colonial, colonial, and post-colonial Georgians have practiced numerous Native American religions alongside Christianity through the formation of missions. Other faiths including Hoodoo or Lowcountry Voodoo were also introduced in colonial and post-colonial Georgia through the Gullah-Geechee peoples. In colonial and post-colonial Georgia, Christianity became the state's largest religion, representing 79% of the adult population in 2014, and 78% in 2020, according to two separate studies by the Pew Research Center and Public Religion Research Institute.'

Per the Pew Research Center in 2014, non-Christian religions accounted for 3% of the population, with Judaism and Islam tied at 1% of the religiously-affiliated population. Eastern religions including Buddhism and Hinduism were both less than 1% each of the population, and other world religions accounted for less than 1% of the state's religious constituents. Other faiths such as New Age and Native American religions were 2% of the population, and approximately 18% of the state were unaffiliated, including agnostics and atheists. Among the state in 2014, 13% practiced nothing in particular.

== Largest cities ==
Largest cities or towns in United States http://www.citypopulation.de/USA-Georgia.html
| Rank | | County | Pop. |
|---|---|---|---|
| 1 | Atlanta | Fulton | 496,461 |
| 2 | Columbus | Muscogee | 205,617 |
| 3 | Augusta | Richmond | 201,196 |
| 4 | Macon | Bibb | 156,762 |
| 5 | Savannah | Chatham | 147,088 |
| 6 | Athens | Clarke | 127,358 |
| 7 | South Fulton | Fulton | 108,575 |
| 8 | Sandy Springs | Fulton | 107,180 |
| 9 | Roswell | Fulton | 92,530 |
| 10 | Johns Creek | Fulton | 82,065 |

== See also ==
- African Americans in Atlanta
- History of Georgia (U.S. State)
