= List of metropolitan areas in Georgia (U.S. state) =

The U.S. Census Bureau lists fourteen metropolitan areas (Metropolitan Statistical Areas) and four trading areas (Combined Statistical Areas) in the U.S. state of Georgia. The tables below include the U.S. Census Bureau's most recent population estimates (2025; released March 26, 2026).

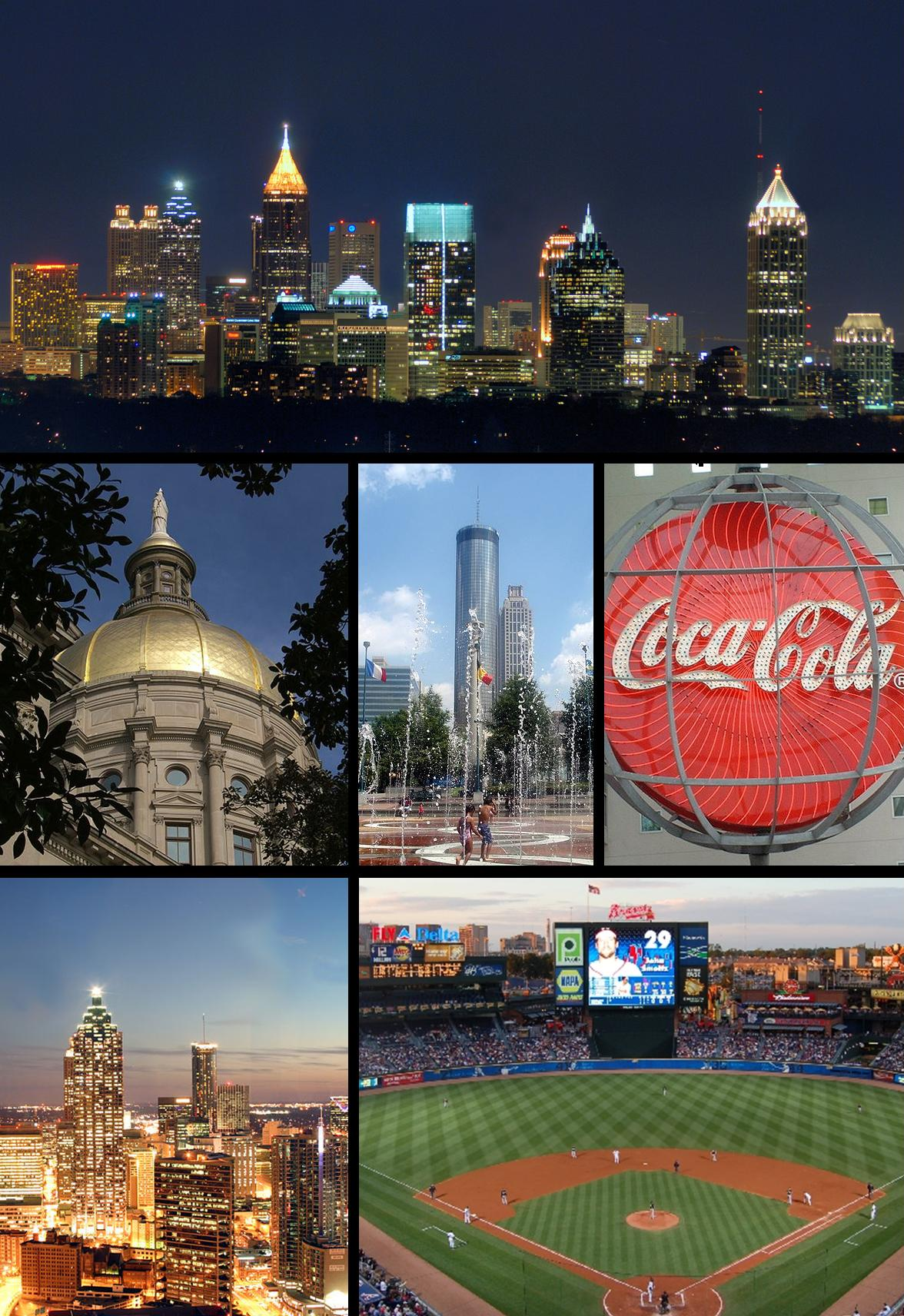
Atlanta, largest city and metropolitan area

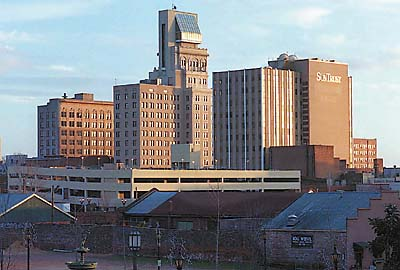
Augusta, second-largest metropolitan area

Rank	Metropolitan Area	Population, 2025 estimates
1	Atlanta–Sandy Springs–Roswell	6,482,182
2	Augusta (GA–SC)	641,231
3	Savannah	438,314
4	Columbus (GA–AL)	324,830
5	Macon	238,533
6	Gainesville	226,568
7	Athens	224,148
8	Warner Robins	208,091
9	Valdosta	153,276
10	Dalton	147,819
11	Albany	145,510
12	Brunswick	118,524
13	Rome	101,378
14	Hinesville	91,870

Rank	Combined Statistical Area	Population, 2025 estimates
1	Atlanta–Athens–Clarke County–Sandy Springs (GA-AL)	7,426,769
2	Savannah–Hinesville–Statesboro	660,642
3	Columbus–Phenix City (AL)–Auburn (AL)–Opelika (AL)	573,796
4	Macon–Warner Robins	446,644

== See also ==
- Table of United States Metropolitan Statistical Areas
- Table of United States Combined Statistical Areas
- Georgia statistical areas
