= West Georgia (region) =

Coordinates: 32°20′N 84°30′W

- Region
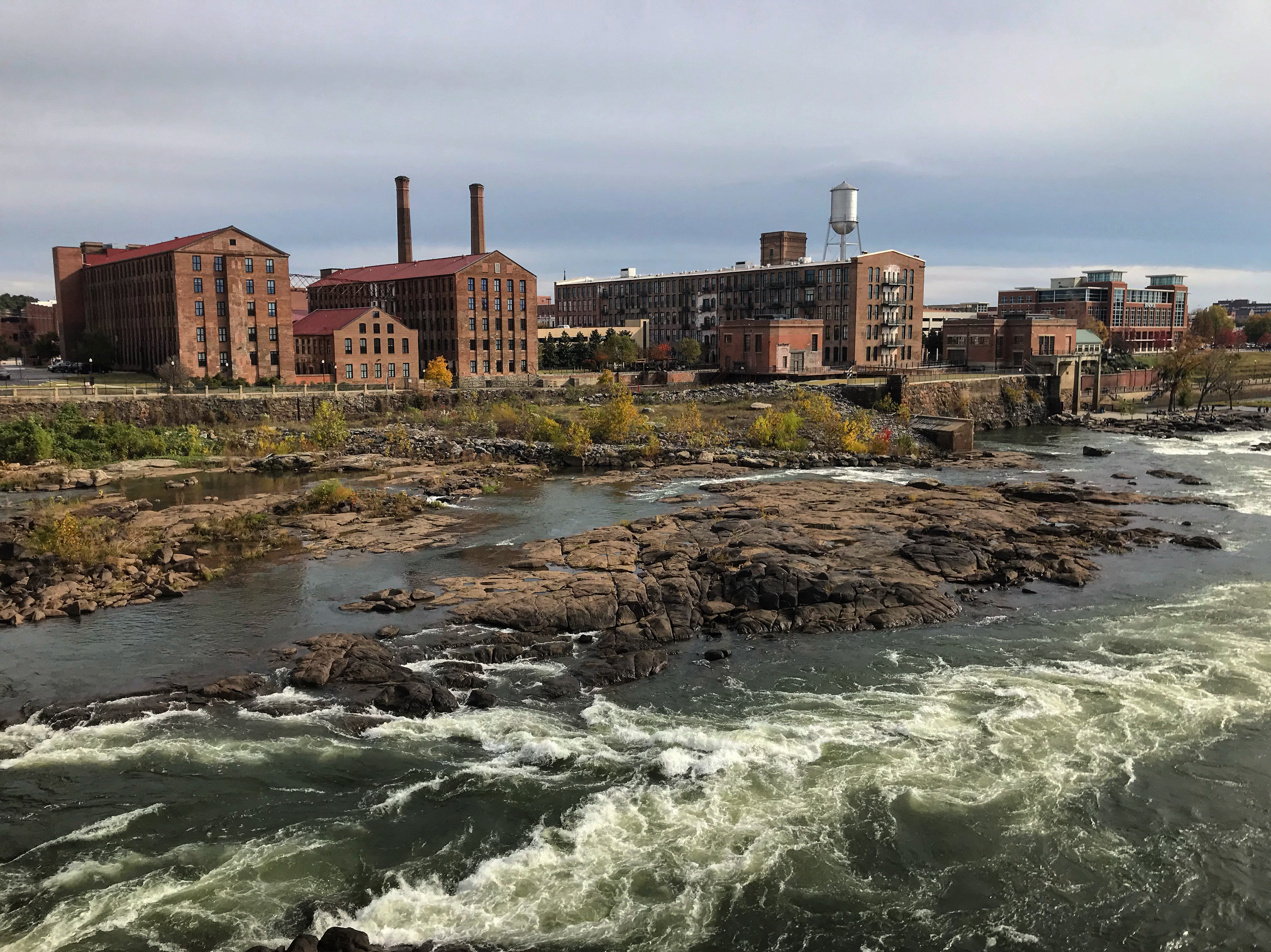
- Downtown Columbus

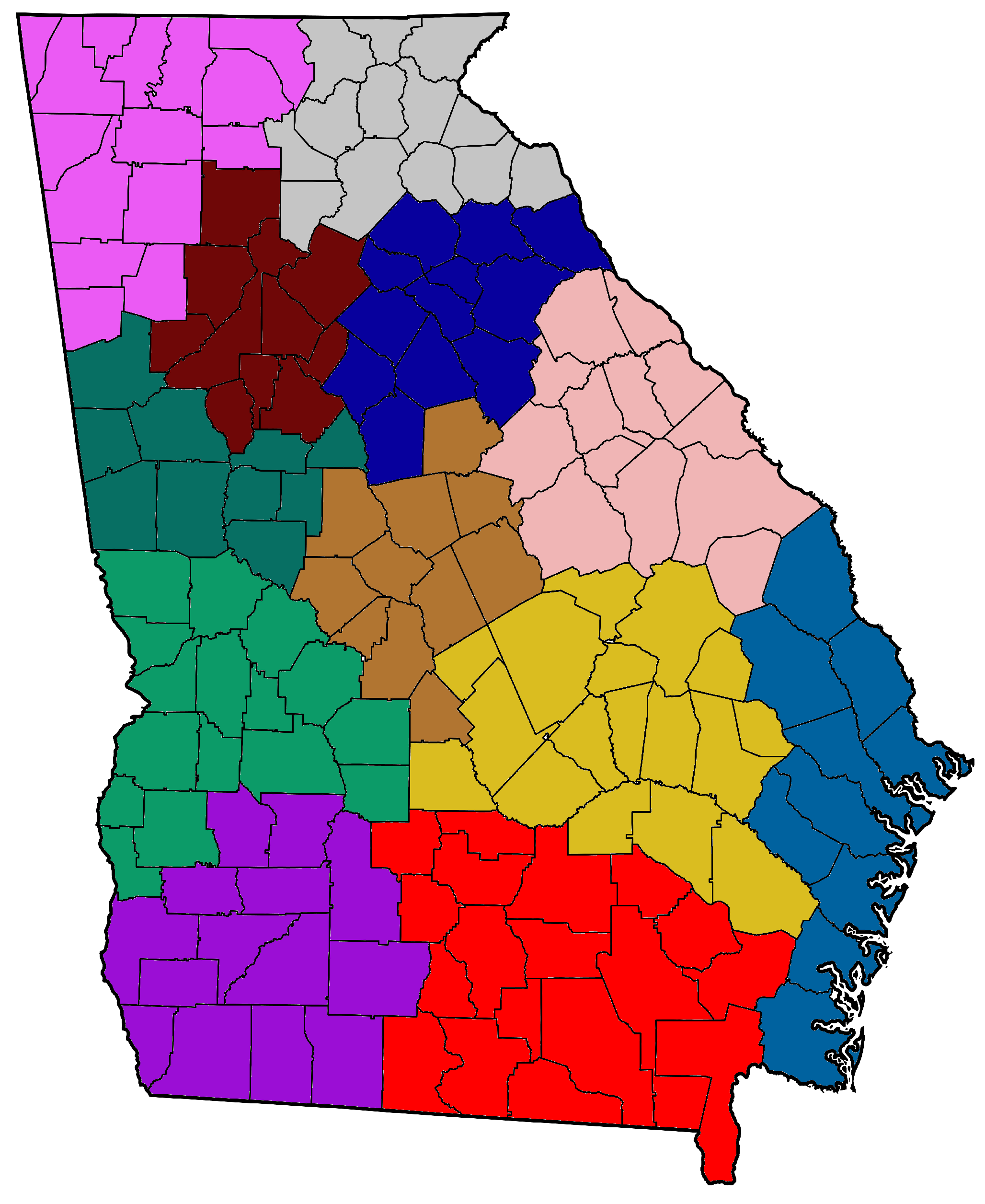
- West Georgia highlighted in green

- Location of Georgia within the United States
- Country: United States
- State: Georgia
- Largest city: Columbus

Population (2020)
  - Total: 368,953
- Demonym: West Georgian
- Website: georgia.org/regions/west-georgia

West Georgia is a sixteen-county region in the U.S. state of Georgia, bordering Alabama. Encompassing a portion of the Southern Rivers, West Georgia is anchored by Columbus, the state's second-largest city by population; its metropolitan statistical area, as of 2020, was Georgia's fourth-most populous metropolitan area. Tabulating the region's counties, West Georgia had a 2020 US census population of 368,953.

== Geography ==
According to the Georgia Department of Economic Development, West Georgia made up the following counties: Chattahoochee, Clay, Crisp, Dooly, Harris, Macon, Marion, Muscogee, Quitman, Randolph, Schley, Stewart, Sumter, Talbot, Taylor, and Webster. West Georgia borders the US state of Alabama, being separated by the Chattahoochee River.

== Demographics ==
As of the 2020 U.S. census, the region had 368,953 residents.

Located within the Bible Belt, Christianity is West Georgia's predominant religion, and has been since British colonization of the Americas. According to the Association of Religion Data Archives in 2020, Protestantism was the largest form of Christianity practiced. The region's largest Christian denominations were the Southern Baptist Convention, non-denominational Protestants including the Christian Churches and Churches of Christ; the United Methodist Church and National Baptist Convention, USA. The Catholic Church was the largest non-Protestant Christian tradition in the region.

Throughout West Georgia, Islam was the region's second-largest religion, followed by the Baha'i Faith and Judaism.

== Economy ==
The region's economy is primarily stimulated by the Columbus metropolitan area, with prominent employers being Fort Benning, the Muscogee County School District, Total System Services, and Columbus State University.

== Transportation ==
=== Air ===
- Columbus Airport

=== Interstate ===
- Interstate 185

=== U. S. routes ===
- U.S. Route 27
- U.S. Route 27 Alternate
- U.S. Route 80
- U.S. Route 280
