= 1947 Columbus mid-air collision =

Aviation disaster in Georgia, US

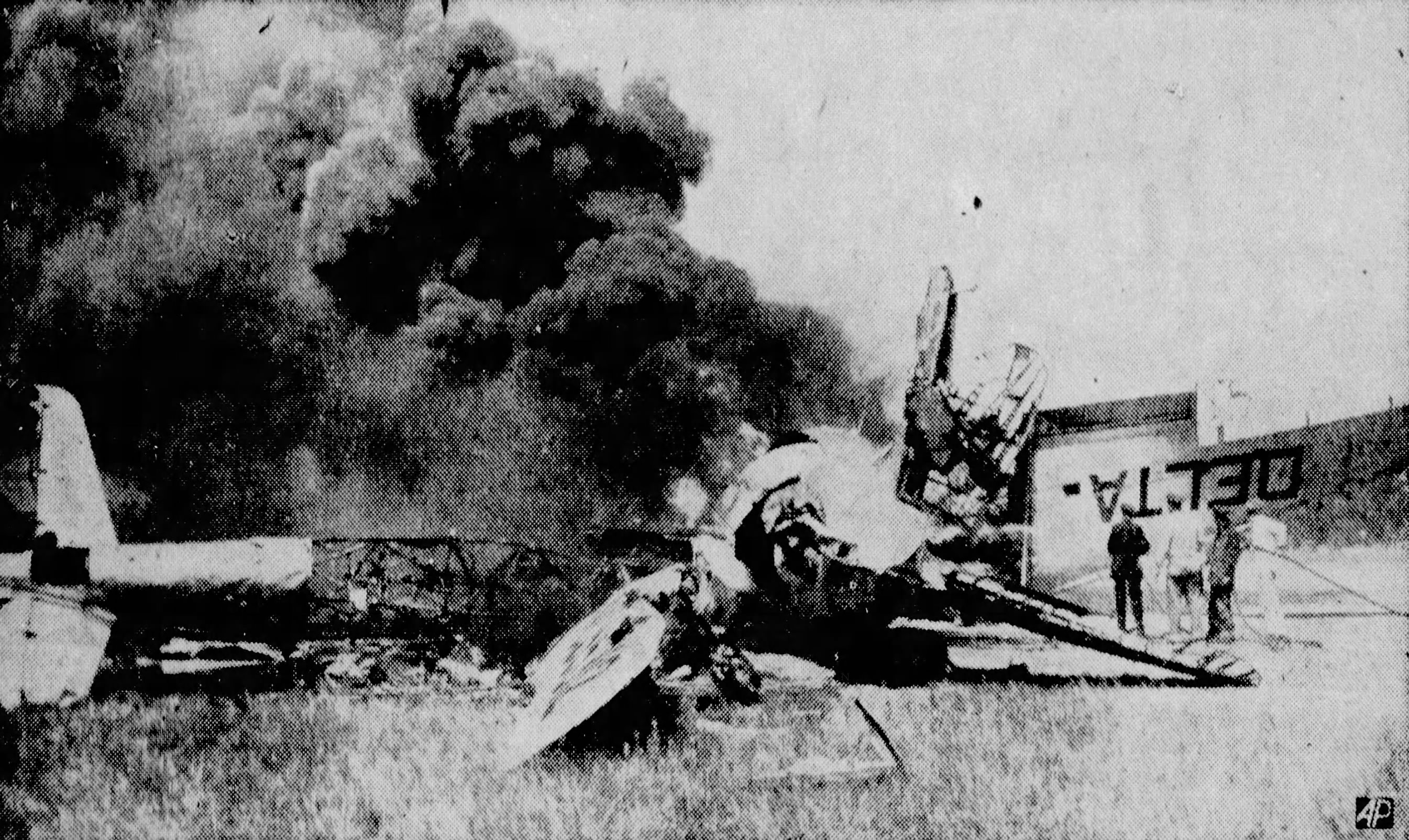
- Burning wreckage from the two planes involved in the mid-air collision

Accident
- Date: April 22, 1947
- Summary: Mid-air collision
- Site: Muscogee County Airport, Columbus, Georgia, U.S.; 32°30′49″N 84°56′35″W
- Total fatalities: 9
- Total survivors: 0

First aircraft
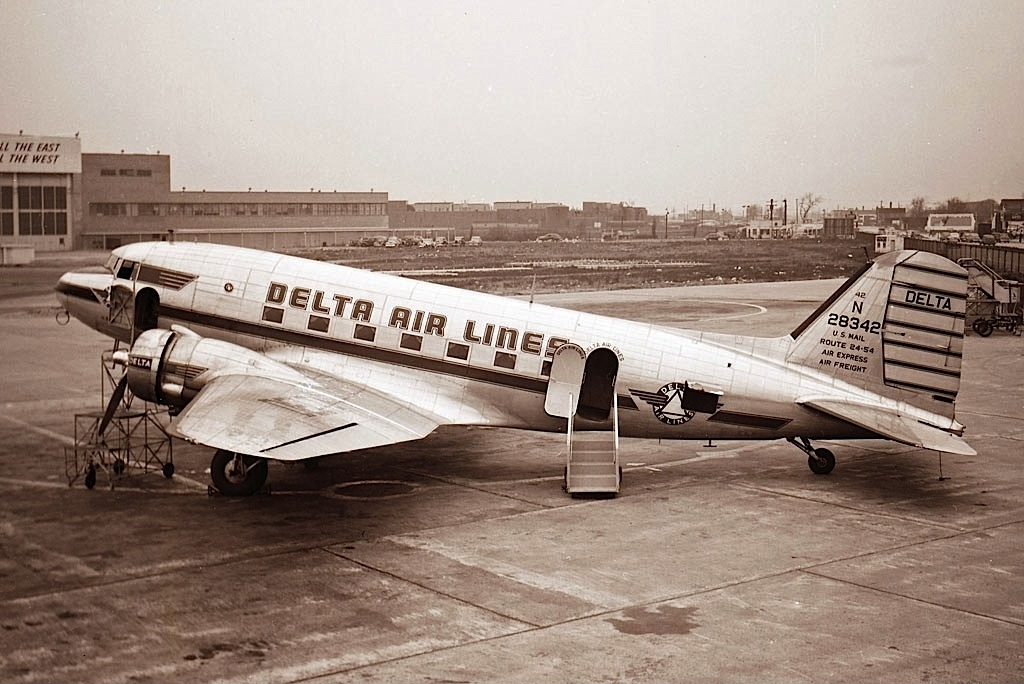
- A Delta Air Lines Douglas DC-3 that was similar to the aircraft involved in the accident.
- Type: Douglas DC-3C
- Name: Survey
- Operator: Delta Air Lines
- Registration: NC49657
- Flight origin: Macon Airport, Macon, Georgia
- Destination: Muscogee County Airport, Columbus, Georgia
- Occupants: 8
- Passengers: 5
- Crew: 3
- Fatalities: 8
- Survivors: 0

Second aircraft
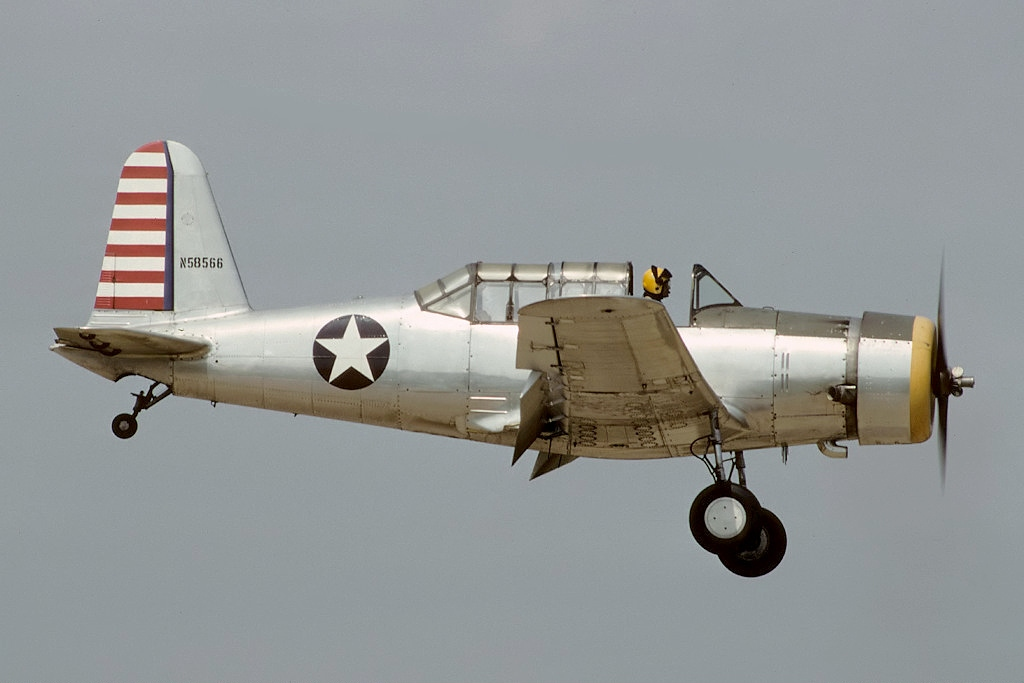
- An example of the Vultee BT-13
- Type: Vultee BT-13 Valiant
- Operator: Tuskegee Aviation Institute
- Registration: NC55312
- Flight origin: Columbus Municipal Airport, Columbus, Georgia
- Destination: Muscogee County Airport, Columbus, Georgia
- Occupants: 1
- Passengers: 0
- Crew: 1
- Fatalities: 1
- Survivors: 0

On April 22, 1947, a Douglas DC-3 of Delta Air Lines and a Vultee BT-13 Valiant of the Tuskegee Aviation Institute collided in mid-air above Muscogee County Airport (now Columbus Airport) in Georgia, United States, and crashed. All nine people on board the two aircraft, including eight Delta executives, were killed in the accident. The mid-air collision was the first fatal accident for Delta Air Lines since 1935 and is the deadliest accident to have occurred at the Columbus Airport.

== Aircraft and crews ==
The Delta Air Lines passenger aircraft involved was a Douglas DC-3C with the serial number 9066, built in 1943 during World War II at the Douglas Aircraft Company plant in Long Beach, California, as a military variant Douglas DC-3/C-47-DL. After final assembly, the aircraft was delivered to the United States Army Air Forces (USAAF) with the military aircraft registration 42–32840. After World War II, the USAAF classified the aircraft as surplus stock and retired it. In January 1946, Delta Air Lines took over the aircraft, had it converted to the civilian version DC-3C, and re-registered the aircraft with the aircraft registration NC49657 and the name Survey. The twin-engine medium-range aircraft was powered by two Pratt & Whitney R-1830-92 Twin Wasp double radial engines, each with an output of 1,200 horsepower (890 kW). At the time of the accident, the machine had completed a total operating performance of 2,899 operating hours.

Operating the Douglas DC-3 for Delta was 48-year-old Captain George R. Cushing. Cushing had 11,091 hours of flight experience, 1,800 of which were on the Douglas DC-3. It was suspected that 33-year-old Clayton Berry, Delta's airport communications supervisor, who had 47 hours of flight experience, was in the right pilot's seat at the time of the accident. All eight of the DC-3's occupants were Delta Air Lines executives and Captain Cushing was the airline's vice president of operations. The passengers on the plane were on a flight to Columbus, Georgia, to inspect the airport for future passenger use as a stopover between Atlanta, Georgia, and Meridian, Mississippi, and to also meet with friends and city officials in Columbus. The Delta team had spent the previous day surveying Macon Municipal Airport (present-day Macon Downtown Airport) and meeting local officials there for similar reasons to their visit to Columbus.

The second aircraft involved was a Vultee BT-13 Valiant, which was a modified military training aircraft. The aircraft, with the aircraft registration NC55312, was certified with its modifications at the Tuskegee Aviation Institute on May 20, 1946, and had since completed 100 operating hours. The Vultee was piloted by 39-year-old pilot Joseph C. Fussell, who had over 2,000 hours of flight experience.

== Accident flights ==
Departure points of the two aircraft involved and the point of impact shown over mid-western Georgia.

The Delta Air Lines DC-3 took off from Macon Municipal Airport at 10:04 a.m. At 10:34 a.m, following a routine flight, the captain reported over Columbus. At about the same time, the pilot of the BT-13 was approaching Muscogee County Airport from the southeast.

The BT-13 had taken off at 10:30 a.m. from Columbus Municipal Airport, an airport just to the south of Downtown Columbus, Georgia, which had an unpaved runway. At the time of the accident, it had been recently supplanted by Muscogee County Airport as the city's primary airport; however, general aviation activities continued at Columbus Municipal Airport until its closure in 1969. The flight path of the BT-13 prior to nearing Muscogee County Airport was unknown, but was reported have "likely flown around the city".

The BT-13 reached the vicinity of Muscogee County Airport and approached Runway 5 without first flying any traffic circuits. The DC-3, on the other hand, initially flew one and a half traffic circuits for landing until the captain also aligned it for a landing on Runway 5. Visibility at the airport was reported to have been "perfect".

The DC-3 was on final approach to Muscogee County Airport at a height of just 10 feet (3.0 m) when the Vultee BT-13, which was also landing, suddenly touched down on it at 10:40 a.m. The two aircraft became wedged together with the left wing of the BT-13 getting caught on the empennage of the DC-3. While the weight of the BT-13 and the force of the collision pushed the DC-3 down, Captain Cushing gave it full throttle, which caused the two planes to climb to an altitude of 150 feet (46 m) before a stall occurred. The two planes, still wedged together, struck the ground and caught fire. The planes burned on the ground for an hour and a half before the fire was extinguished by firefighting crews from Columbus, Fort Benning, and Lawson Army Airfield. All nine people occupying the two planes were killed upon impact or in the ensuing fire.

== Investigation ==
After the accident, the Civil Aeronautics Board (CAB) took over the investigation into the cause of the crash. Delta's president, Collett E. Woolman, immediately attributed the accident to the airport's lack of a control tower. A public hearing was held by the CAB ten days after the accident. The CAB released their final report on the accident on July 31, 1947. The investigators found Fussell, the pilot of the Vultee to be responsible for the accident, especially since he had failed to fly a standard left-hand circuit and look for other air traffic when approaching the airport.

== Aftermath ==
Within days of the CAB's final report being released, Muscogee County Airport was approved to receive upgrades to its navigational equipment using federal funding. Despite planning delays caused by the accident, Delta Air Lines initiated services using the DC-3 to the airport on July 1, 1947, as a stop along a route from Atlanta to Fort Worth. However, Delta described the loss of those aboard the Survey as having "removed some of the most valuable and key personnel of our company". The fatal accident was Delta's first since 1935.

== See also ==
- 1948 Northwood mid-air collision – another mid-air collision of a similar time period that also involved two aircraft that were approaching the same airport
- Pacific Southwest Airlines Flight 182 – another mid-air collision between an airliner and general aviation aircraft caused by failure to follow established separation procedures
- Aeromexico Flight 498 - another midair collision between an approaching commercial airliner and a general aviation aircraft.
- 2025 Potomac River mid-air collision - another mid-air collision involving an approaching commercial airliner and a helicopter caused by an overreliance on visual separation
