= Columbus Airport (Georgia) =

Airport in Columbus, Georgia, United States

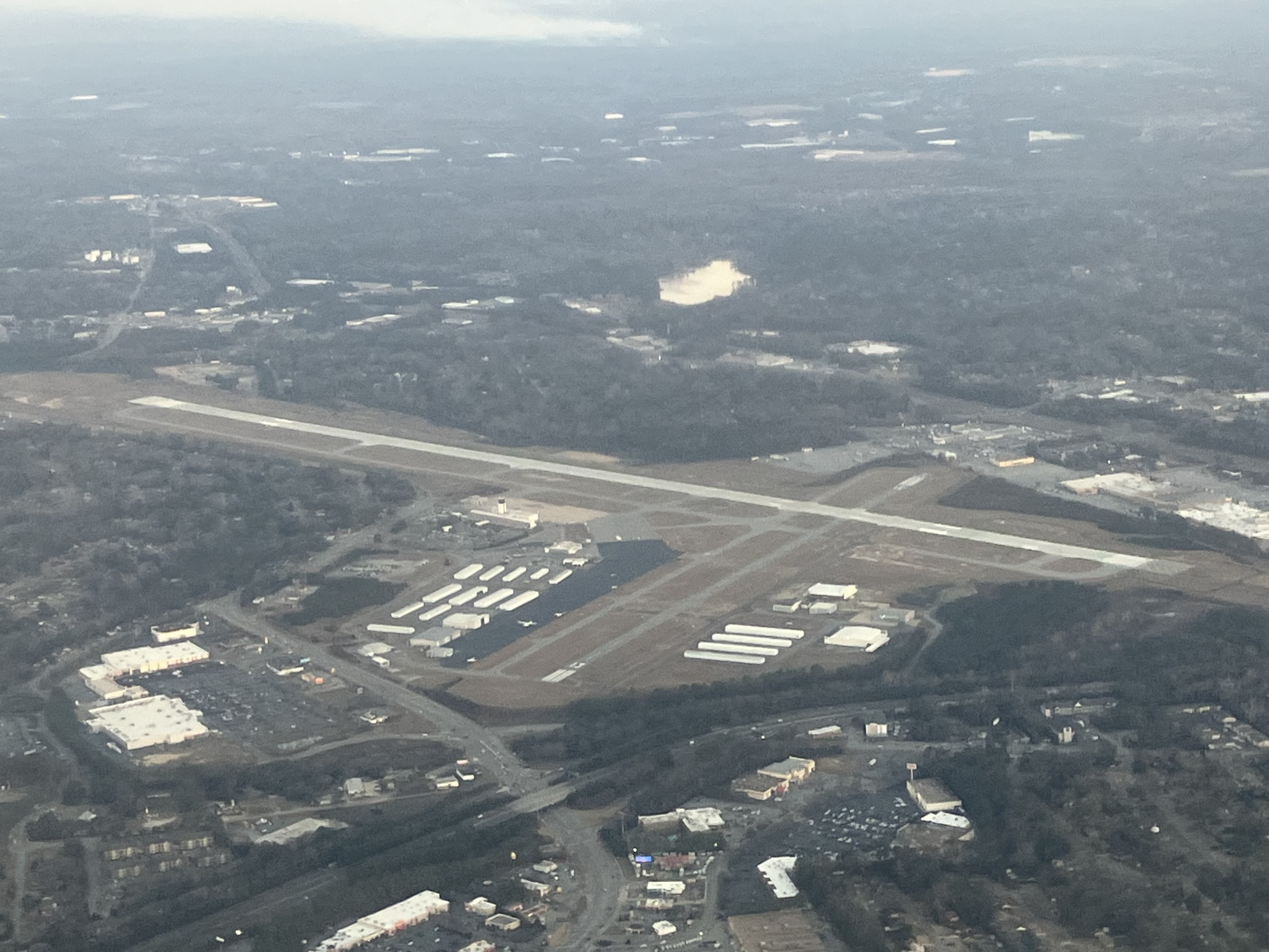
- An aerial view of Columbus Airport from the northwest
- IATA: CSG; ICAO: KCSG; FAA LID: CSG

Summary
- Airport type: Public
- Owner: Columbus Airport Commission
- Serves: Columbus, Georgia, U.S.
- Opened: August 1, 1944; 82 years ago
- Elevation AMSL: 397 ft (121 m)
- Coordinates: 32°30′59″N 084°56′20″W
- Website: flycolumbusga.com

Maps
- FAA airport diagram
- Map of CSG within Columbus, Georgia

Runways
Direction	Length		Surface
Direction	ft	m	Surface
6/24	6,997	2,133	Concrete
13/31	3,997	1,218	Asphalt

Statistics (2022)
- Aircraft operations (year ending 11/30/2022): 37,662
- Based aircraft: 132
- Sources: Airport, FAA, Georgia DOT

Columbus Airport (IATA: CSG, ICAO: KCSG, FAA LID: CSG) (formerly named Columbus Metropolitan Airport and originally named Muscogee County Airport) is a public-use airport in Columbus, Georgia, United States. The airport covers 680 acres (275 ha) and has two intersecting runways. Serving Georgia's second largest city, it is Georgia's fourth busiest airport.

Operated by the Columbus Airport Commission, the airport commenced operations in 1944. It has been served by regularly scheduled airline service since its opening, with nearly all passenger service in the 21st century being operated by regional carriers. Federal Aviation Administration (FAA) records say the airport had 84,387 passenger boardings (enplanements) in calendar year 2022, an increase from 56,520 enplanements in 2021. The National Plan of Integrated Airport Systems for 2011–2015 categorized it as a primary commercial service airport (more than 10,000 enplanements per year).

== Ownership ==
The airport is a public-use airport that is owned and operated by the Columbus Airport Commission. The Muscogee County Airport Commission was established under an amendment to the Constitution of Georgia on April 9, 1968. After the merger between the governments of Muscogee County and Columbus at the start of 1971, the Muscogee County Airport Commission became the Columbus Airport Commission. The airport's five commissioners are appointed to five-year terms by the council of the Columbus Consolidated Government, an elected body representing the districts of Columbus. The Columbus Airport Commission is responsible for the airport's promotion and operations, but cannot collect taxes.

== History ==
=== Opening to 1979 ===
Planning began before the onset of World War II to build Muscogee County Airport as a larger alternative to the existing Columbus Municipal Airport, a grass airfield located just southeast of Columbus' business district. The municipal airport had been operating commercial flights since June 19, 1929, but the new airport would feature longer, paved runways with lighting. Construction continued through the war, and in November 1942, its use was offered by the county to the federal government for military operations upon completion. The completed airfield was officially designated as open to use by the public on December 10, 1944, by the Civil Aeronautics Authority (CAA). A temporary structure housed airport staff at the time of designation, set to be replaced with a $60,000 terminal building following the conclusion of the war.

Eastern Airlines brought the first scheduled airline service to Muscogee County Airport on August 1, 1944, connecting it directly to Atlanta and Montgomery before the airport was certified for use by the CAA. The first scheduled flight arrived in Columbus at 3:08 pm as a stop on a route from New York to Houston in a Ryan Brougham. Following approval by the Civil Aeronautics Board in April 1947, Delta Air Lines initiated services using the Douglas DC-3 to the airport on July 1, 1947, as a stop along a route from Atlanta to Fort Worth. Southern began scheduled services to Atlanta and Jacksonville on June 25, 1949, also using the DC-3. In 1968 Southern was allowed to start nonstop DC-9s from Muscogee County Airport to Dulles International Airport, three a day, all continuing to LaGuardia Airport.

Following the merger of Muscogee County and the city of Columbus, the airport was renamed to Columbus Metropolitan Airport. The older Columbus Municipal Airport closed in 1969 during the consolidation process of the city and county. Southern's New York/Washington service would grow to five services a day by June 1970. Eastern and Southern discontinued services to Columbus in 1979.

=== 1979 to 2000 ===
Columbus Metropolitan Airport would begin to see an increase in regional airline services following the Airline Deregulation Act of 1978. The first of these was Atlantic Southeast Airlines (ASA), which got its start operating five flights from Columbus to Atlanta on June 27, 1979, using a fleet of three de Havilland Canada DHC-6 Twin Otters. ASA would go on to operate the route as one of the inaugural routes of Delta Connection regional services in 1984. Other short-lived regional services to operate out of Columbus included Northwest Airlink and Eastern Metro Express. A new terminal building was completed on June 2, 1991, at the cost of $12 million to replace the original terminal built in the 1940s, though the old control tower was used by the FAA for several months following the opening of the new complex due to complications in lease agreements. Delta's discontinued its mainline flights in the autumn of 1995, terminating by the release of their December timetable. The first Thunder in the Valley Air Show was hosted by the airport in April 1997.

=== 2000 to 2023 ===
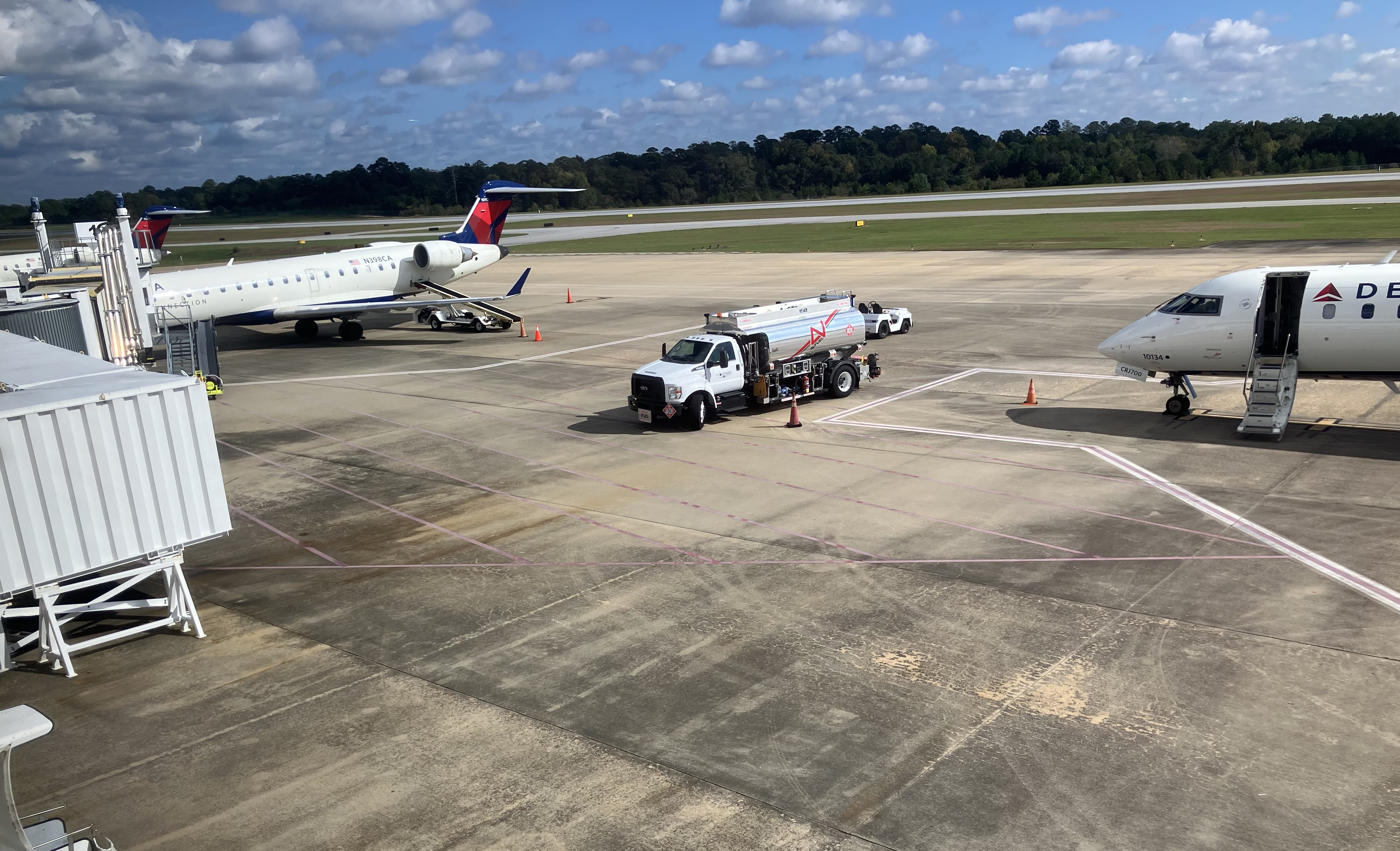
Delta Connection CRJs parked at all three gates of Columbus Airport

On January 21, 2010, the airport was renamed from Columbus Metropolitan Airport to the more simplified Columbus Airport at the onset of a $3.3 million renovation project that occurred in 2010. The project included aesthetic updates to the terminal interior and the repaving of Runway 6/24. On April 7–8, 2018 the airport hosted the final Thunder in the Valley Air Show. The event had raised over a million dollars for local youth charities over its 21-year run, but was finally ended due to high operational costs and a decline in sponsors.

Another airport renovation project was completed in 2021 at the cost of $13.5 million. The 2021 project increased the capacity of the terminal building for airline operations and added seating throughout the airport including an indoor aircraft viewing area. The goal of the project was to attract additional airline service to Columbus. This was temporarily effective as American Eagle began daily services to Charlotte and Dallas–Fort Worth after eight years of not serving the airport; however, the services only lasted from August 2021 to April 2023 with American citing a shortage in pilots and the end of payroll support grants distributed during the COVID-19 pandemic as the reason behind their withdrawal.

=== 2024 to present ===
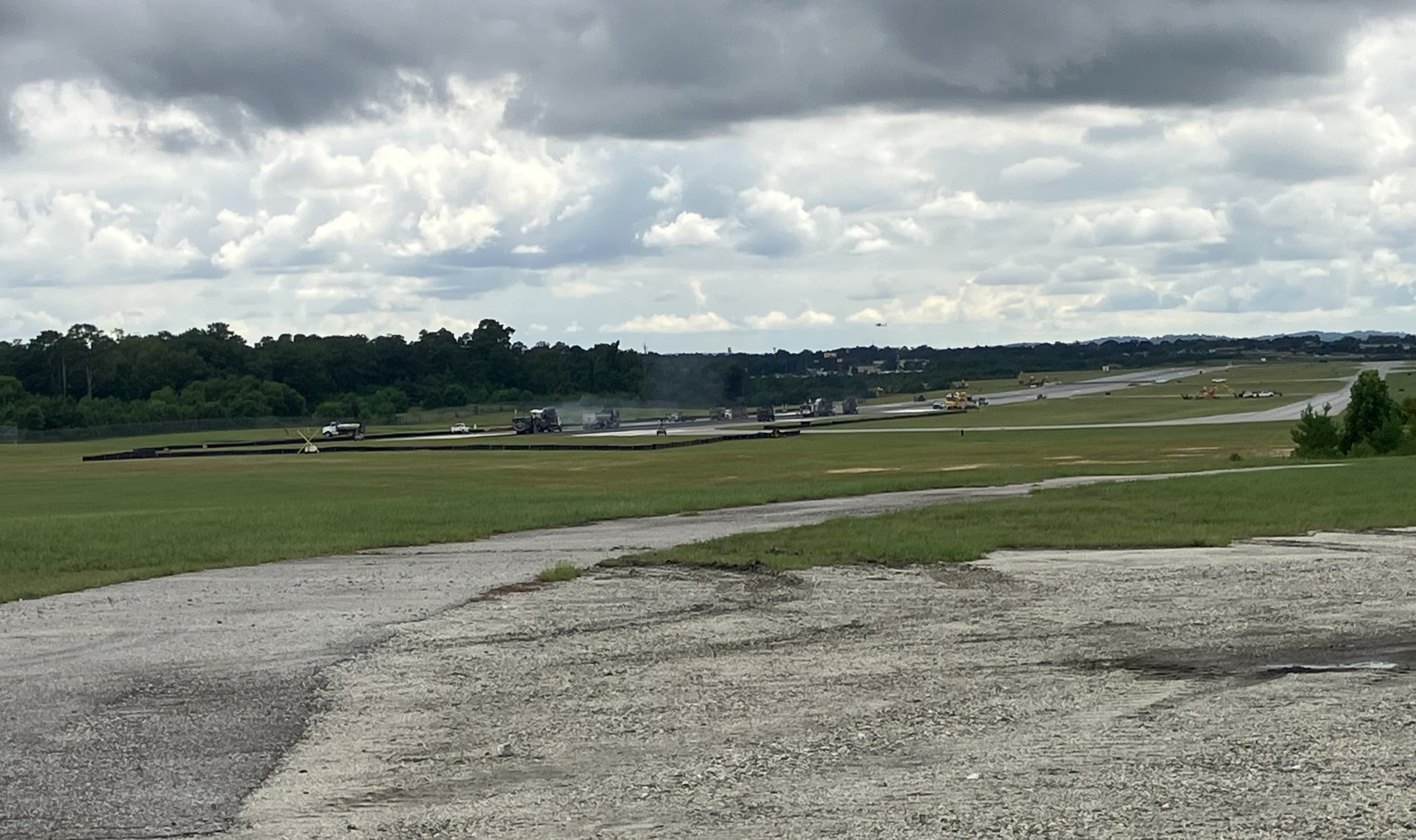
Work being done to rebuild Runway 6/24 at Columbus Airport on August 5, 2025

In April 2024, the Columbus Airport Commission announced that the airport would be closing its longest runway, 6/24, to be entirely replaced for the first time since the airport opened in 1944 through the summer of 2025, but the project was later pushed back to last from August 5, 2025, to November 27, 2025. The runway's surface was switched from an asphalt runway to concrete during the project. A blast pad was also added to the beginning of Runway 24. The construction prohibited the use of the airport for military and commercial operations, including Delta Connection flights. Prior to the start of the project, the anticipated total cost for the rebuild was $36.5 million, $24.4 million of the construction cost was covered by grants awarded by the FAA's Airport Improvement Program. The runway reconstruction began as planned with a groundbreaking ceremony attended by airport staff and local officials on August 5, 2025. After three months of being closed, the runway was reopened on November 28, 2025. Delta Connection resumed service to Columbus from Atlanta on the day of the reopening. On May 19, 2026, Columbus Airport announced that Delta would resume mainline service to Atlanta on June 12, 2026 with mid-day flights on Fridays and Saturdays using the Boeing 717 to capture traffic generated by nearby Fort Benning. The semi-weekly mainline flights operated from June to early September, and again on Thursdays and Fridays from late November to the end of December.

== Future ==
Delta as its regional brand, Delta Connection, remains as the only commercial carrier at Columbus Airport with two to three daily flights to and from Atlanta despite Columbus being Georgia's second largest market following American Eagle's exit in 2023. In November 2025, it was reported that Columbus Airport is in talks to have a low-cost carrier begin two new routes out of the airport and in June 2026 the airport manager claimed of Delta's mainline flights that if each of them is filled to at least 85 percent capacity it will indicate that increased scheduled capacity at Columbus Airport is realistic. Work to replace the airport's general aviation terminal is set to commence in 2026. The design phase for the new general aviation terminal and a renovated Taxiway D was in progress in November 2025.

== Facilities ==
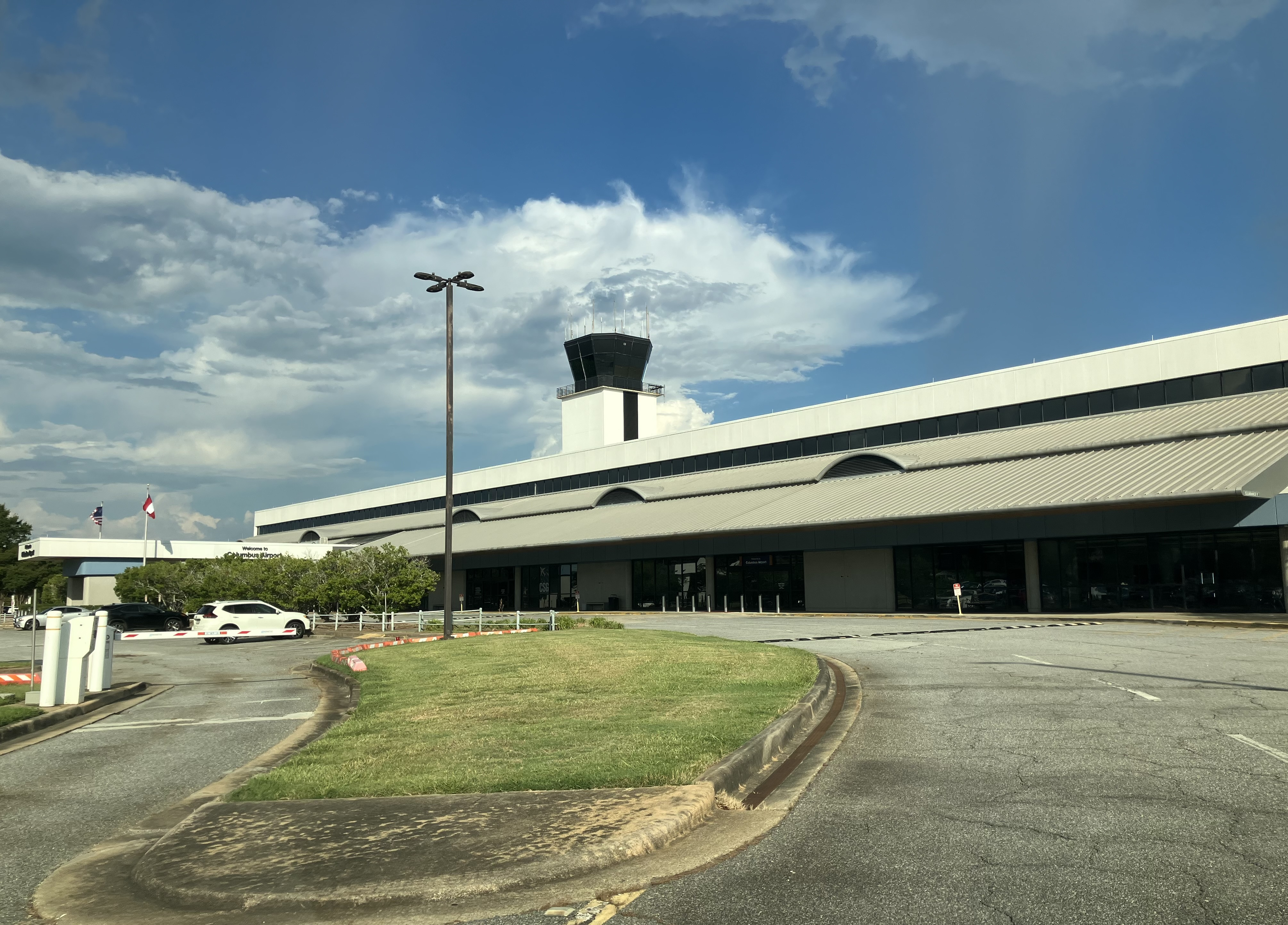
The Columbus Airport terminal building and tower

Columbus Airport covers 680 acres (275 ha) at an elevation of 397 feet (121 m) four miles northeast of Downtown Columbus. It has two intersecting runways: 6/24 is 6,997 by 150 feet (2,133 x 46 m) with a concrete surface and 13/31 is 3,997 by 150 feet (1,218 x 46 m) with an asphalt surface. Runway 6/24, the primary runway, is equipped with high-intensity runway lighting, precision approach path indicators, and a full parallel taxiway with medium-intensity taxiway lighting. Runway 6 has a medium-intensity approach lighting system with runway alignment indicators and Runway 24 has runway end identifier lights. Runway 6 has been used a test platform for end-fire upslope ILSs twice, the first was in the 1960s, and an update to that ILS was tested from 1990 to 1991.

The secondary runway, Runway 13/31 has medium-intensity runway lighting, a full parallel taxiway also with medium-intensity lighting, and runway end identifier lights. Runway 30 is equipped with a visual approach slope indicator. Runway 6 is equipped with ILS, NDB, or RNAV approach systems and Runway 24 has VOR/DME or RNAV systems.

Runways at Columbus Airport
SW	Length	Width	NE
6 →	6,997 ft 2,133 m	150 ft 46 m	← 24
NW	Length	Width	SE
3 →	3,997 ft 1,218 m	150 ft 46 m	← 31

The airside portion of Columbus Airport's terminal contains three secured gates, two of which are equipped with jet bridges. The landside portion of the airport has amenities, airline and car rental check-in counters, a baggage claim conveyor, and an aircraft viewing area.

The airport has a rotating beacon, illuminated wind cone, automated surface observing system (ASOS), and a control tower. The airport has a public safety department that is responsible for fire and law enforcement services on and around the airport. The fire station is situated next to the terminal building at the east end of the commercial ramp. A helipad is located on the northwestern edge of the airport.

== Airlines and destinations ==
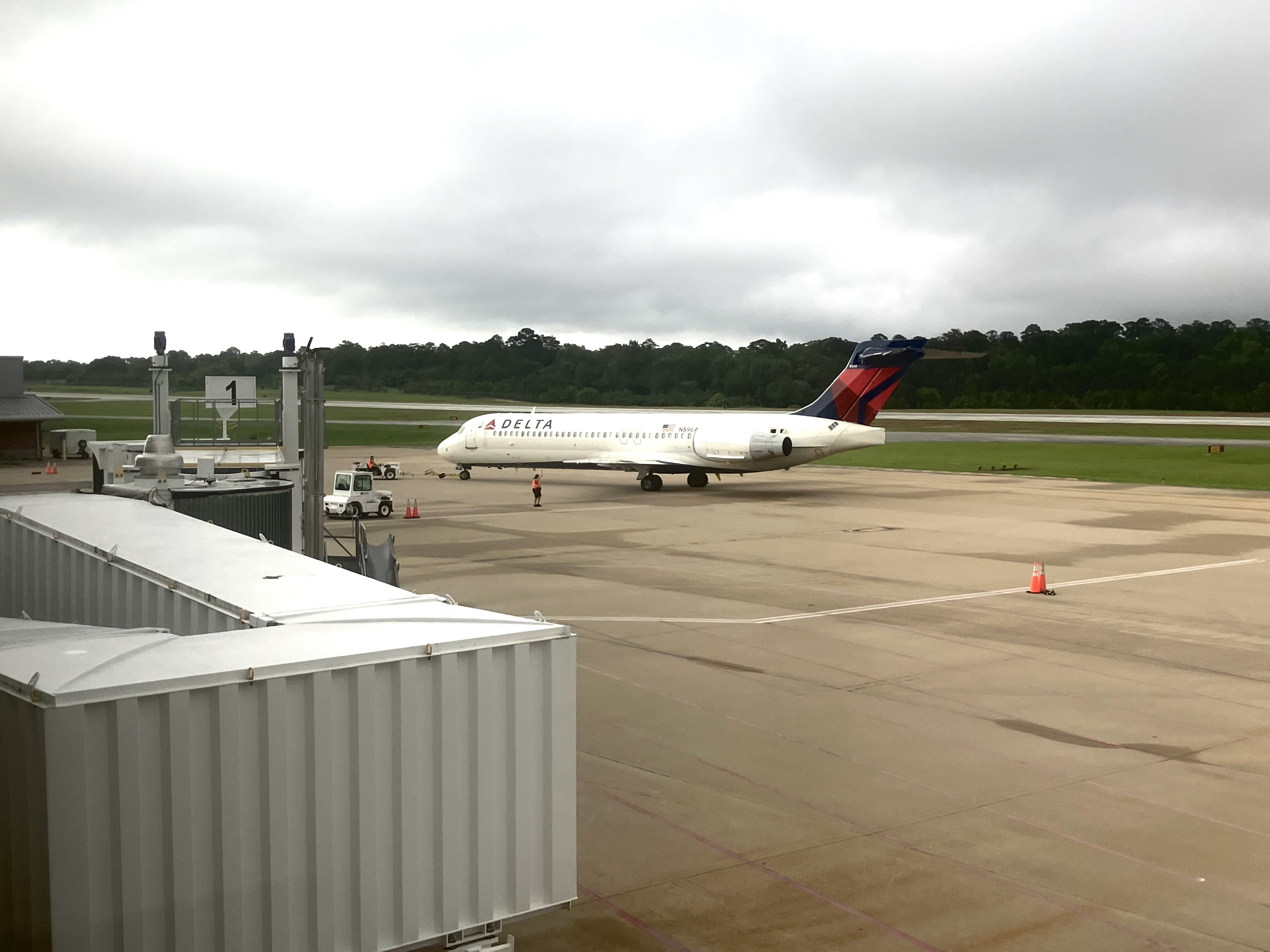
A Delta Air Lines Boeing 717-200 during pushback on the airport's ramp

Columbus Airport has historically provided passenger, cargo, and charter flights to several destinations in the Eastern United States. As of June 2026, the only regularly scheduled services at the airport are three daily passenger flights to Atlanta and a daily cargo flight to Memphis.

=== Passenger ===
Airlines	Destinations
Delta Connection	Atlanta

Destinations map
Destinations from Columbus Metropolitan Airport
Red = Current destination
Blue = Future destination
Pink = Destination being terminated

=== Cargo ===
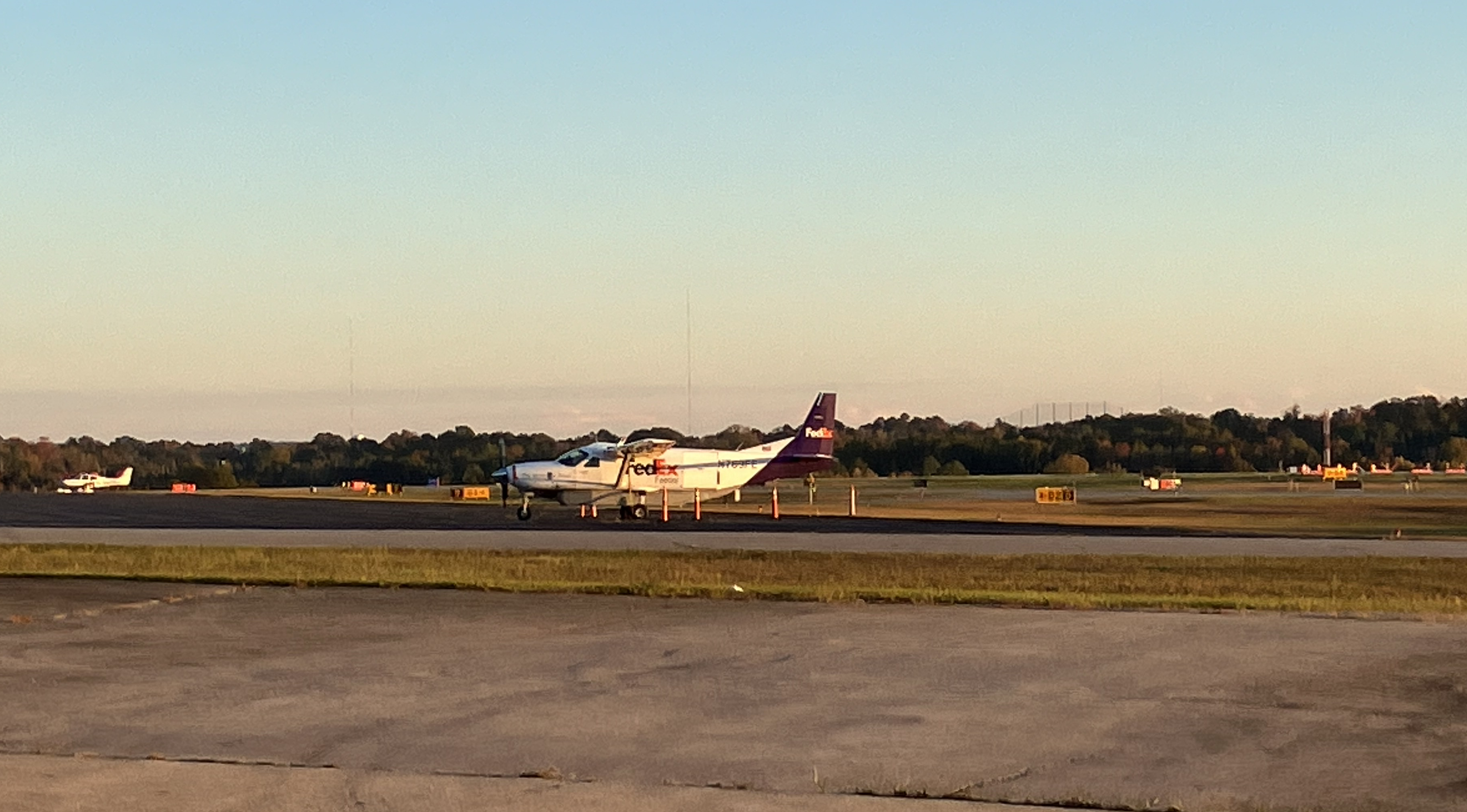
A FedEx Feeder Cessna 208 Caravan parked at the airport's cargo ramp

Airlines	Destinations	Refs
FedEx Feeder	Memphis	

=== Destination statistics ===
Busiest domestic routes from CSG (November 2024 – October 2025)
Rank	City	Passengers
1	Atlanta, Georgia	76,060

== Ground transport ==
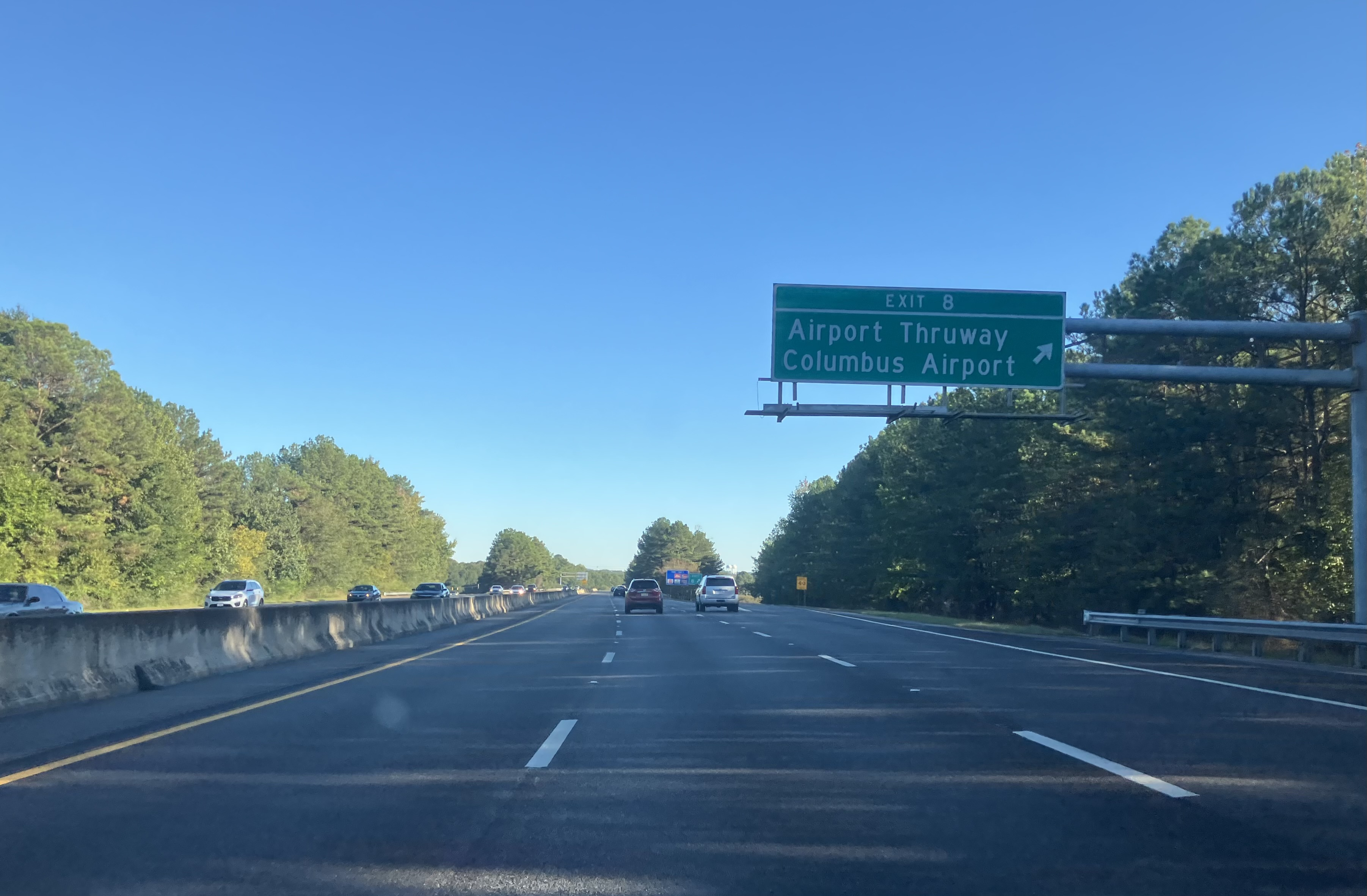
The exit for Airport Thruway and Columbus Airport on Interstate 185

Columbus Airport is served by Airport Thruway, an arterial road that links it directly to nearby Interstate 185 and Veterans Parkway (US 27 / SR 1), though some of the airport's hangars are accessed by Armour Road. The airport's parking lots are located at ground level and can hold 1,214 vehicles in lots designated for the fixed-base operator, general short-term visitors, and general long-term visitors. The airport is served by several taxi and rental car companies. Route 10 of the METRA Transit System serves a bus stop along Airport Thruway at a nearby Walmart on an hourly basis.

== Statistics ==
In the year ending November 30, 2022, the airport had 37,662 aircraft operations, with an average of 103 per day: 86% general aviation, 7% air taxi, 3% airline, and 4% military. Additionally, 132 aircraft were then based at the airport: 106 single-engine, 13 multi-engine, 7 jet, 2 helicopter, 1 glider and 3 ultralight. As of 2022, it is Georgia's fourth busiest airport behind Atlanta, Savannah, and Augusta. FAA records say the airport had 84,387 passenger boardings (enplanements) in calendar year 2022, an increase from 56,520 enplanements in 2021 and 63,726 enplanements in 2010. The National Plan of Integrated Airport Systems for 2011–2015 categorized Columbus Airport as a primary commercial service airport (more than 10,000 enplanements per year).

== Accidents ==
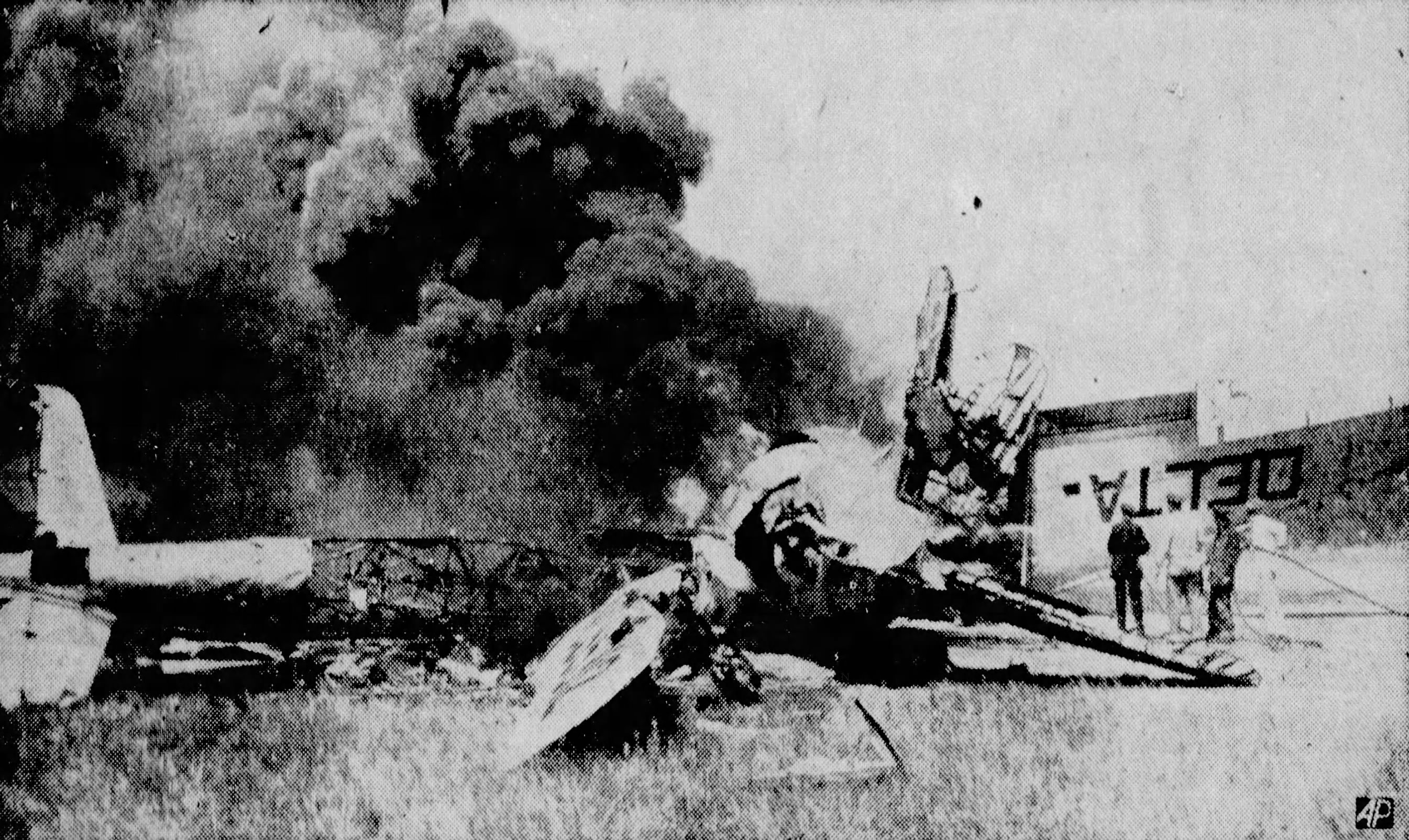
Burning wreckage from the two planes involved in the 1947 Columbus mid-air collision

- On April 22, 1947: 1947 Columbus mid-air collision at 10:40 am, a Vultee BT-13 NC55312 owned by Tuskegee Aviation Institute landed on top of a Dougles DC-3C NC49657 operated by Delta Air Lines that was just about to touchdown on Runway 5 (present-day Runway 6). Both aircraft crashed and burned resulting the deaths of eight of Delta's senior managers on board the DC-3 who were on a survey flight. The pilot of the BT-13 also died in the crash. Delta's president, Collett E. Woolman attributed the accident to the airport's lack of a control tower.
- On July 9, 1981, at 9:56 pm, on a flight from Ozark, Alabama to Augusta, Georgia, a Cessna 411 crashed in a residential area while trying to make an emergency landing at the airport. The pilot, the sole occupant, had only 25 total flying hours and was not rated for instrument flight. There was one fatality.
- On August 17, 1984, at 1:13 pm after stopping to refuel on a flight from Tennessee to Florida, a Mooney M20 crashed shortly after takeoff. There were four fatalities. The aircraft had previously sustained substantial damage in an incident at Porvenir Island, Panama.
- On July 19, 2009, at around 6:15 pm, a Rutan VariEze crashed shortly after takeoff due to fuel starvation, impacting a hangar approximately 50 yards (46 m) from Runway 31. The pilot was the sole occupant and was killed.

== See also ==
- List of airports in Georgia (U.S. state)
