= National Register of Historic Places listings in Stewart County, Georgia =

Stewart County, Georgia, has 27 properties and districts listed on the National Register of Historic Places (NRHP).

This National Park Service list is complete through NPS recent listings posted September 4, 2026.

== Current listings ==
	Name on the Register	Image	Date listed	Location	City or town	Description
1	Armstrong House	Armstrong House	June 29, 1982 (#82002466)	Broad St. 32°03′04″N 84°47′34″W	Lumpkin	
2	Bedingfield Inn	Bedingfield Inn	May 7, 1973 (#73000643)	Cotton St. 32°03′02″N 84°47′44″W	Lumpkin	Built c. 1836
3	Bush-Usher House		June 29, 1982 (#82002467)	E. Main St. 32°02′58″N 84°47′29″W	Lumpkin	
4	Dr. Miller's Office		June 29, 1982 (#82002468)	E. Main St. 32°03′00″N 84°47′31″W	Lumpkin	
5	East Main Street Residential Historic District		June 29, 1982 (#82002469)	E. Main St. 32°02′59″N 84°47′34″W	Lumpkin	
6	Green Grove Church, School, and Cemetery	Green Grove Church, School, and Cemetery	June 20, 1995 (#95000734)	4062 Old Lumpkin-Eufaula Rd. 32°00′26″N 84°51′44″W	Lumpkin	
7	Dr. R. L. Grier House		June 29, 1982 (#82002470)	Broad St. 32°03′04″N 84°48′10″W	Lumpkin	
8	George Y. Harrell House		June 29, 1982 (#82002471)	Broad St. 32°03′02″N 84°48′09″W	Lumpkin	
9	Jared Irwin House		June 29, 1982 (#82002472)	E. Main St. 32°02′58″N 84°47′31″W	Lumpkin	
10	Louvale Church Row Historic District	Louvale Church Row Historic District	April 11, 1986 (#86000747)	US 27; 32°10′38″N 84°49′31″W	Louvale	
11	Lumpkin Commercial Historic District	Lumpkin Commercial Historic District	June 29, 1982 (#82002473)	Main, Broad, Cotton, and Mulberry Sts. 32°03′00″N 84°47′41″W	Lumpkin	
12	Mathis House		June 29, 1982 (#82002474)	E. Main St. 32°03′00″N 84°47′28″W	Lumpkin	
13	Dr. Thomas B. Miller House	Dr. Thomas B. Miller House	March 2, 1988 (#87001900)	97 Nicholson St. 32°05′17″N 84°40′06″W	Richland	
14	Old Chattahoochee County Courthouse	Old Chattahoochee County Courthouse	September 18, 1980 (#80001233)	3557 South Lumpkin Road; 32°23′02″N 84°57′31″W	Columbus	One of three antebellum courthouses still existing in Georgia. Currently part of the Historic Westville museum in Columbus.
15	Pigtail Alley Historic District		June 29, 1982 (#82002475)	Old Chestnut Rd. 32°02′49″N 84°48′01″W	Lumpkin	
16	Nathaniel Prothro Plantation	Nathaniel Prothro Plantation	May 2, 1985 (#85000939)	Old Americus Rd. 32°06′05″N 84°39′02″W	Richland	
17	Richland Historic District	Richland Historic District	May 5, 1986 (#86001021)	Roughly bounded by Ponder, Harmony, Broad and Olemen, and Wali Sts. 32°05′27″N 84°39′45″W	Richland	
18	Stoddard Rockwell House		June 29, 1982 (#82002476)	Rockwell St. 32°03′07″N 84°47′44″W	Lumpkin	No longer extant per Google Street View
19	Roods Landing Site	Roods Landing Site	August 19, 1975 (#75000609)	S of Omaha at confluence of Rood Creek and the Chattahoochee River; 32°01′40″N 85°02′37″W	Omaha	
20	Second Methodist Church		June 29, 1982 (#82002477)	Mulberry St. 32°02′49″N 84°47′37″W	Lumpkin	
21	Singer-Moye Archeological Site		August 1, 1975 (#75000608)	Address Restricted	Lumpkin	
22	Smith-Alston House		June 20, 1980 (#80001235)	405 Ponder St. 32°05′38″N 84°39′42″W	Richland	
23	Stewart County Courthouse	Stewart County Courthouse	September 18, 1980 (#80001234)	Courthouse Sq. 32°03′01″N 84°47′40″W	Lumpkin	
24	John A. Tucker House		June 29, 1982 (#82002478)	Florence St. 32°03′10″N 84°47′47″W	Lumpkin	
25	Uptown Residential Historic District	Uptown Residential Historic District	June 29, 1982 (#82002479)	Broad and Main Sts. 32°03′06″N 84°47′52″W	Lumpkin	
26	Usher House	Usher House	June 29, 1982 (#82002480)	Florence St. 32°03′08″N 84°48′04″W	Lumpkin	Built c. 1836
27	West Hill	West Hill	September 18, 1978 (#78001006)	S of Lumpkin on U.S. 27; 32°00′20″N 84°47′53″W	Lumpkin	
