= Stewart County School District =

School district in Georgia (U.S. state)

Address
- 7062 Green Grove Road Lumpkin, Georgia, 31815; United States
- Coordinates: 32.035147°N 84.841919°W

District information
- Grades: Pre-school - 12
- Superintendent: Dr. Michael Robinson
- Accreditations: Southern Association of Colleges and Schools; Georgia Accrediting Commission

Students and staff
- Enrollment: 704
- Faculty: 58

Other information
- Telephone: (229) 838-4329
- Fax: (229) 838-6984
- Website: www.stewart.k12.ga.us

The Stewart County School District is a public school district in Stewart County, Georgia, United States, based in Lumpkin. It serves the communities of Louvale, Lumpkin, Omaha, and Richland.

== Schools ==
The Stewart County School District contains one elementary school, one middle school, and one high school.

=== Elementary school ===
- Stewart County Elementary School

=== Middle school ===
- Stewart County Middle School

=== High school ===
- Stewart County High School
