= Richland Historic District =

Richland Historic District may refer to:

- Richland Historic District (Richland, Georgia), listed on the National Register of Historic Places (NRHP) in Stewart County
- Richland Historic District (Richland, Michigan), NRHP-listed in Kalamazoo County
- Richland-West End Historic District, Nashville, Tennessee, NRHP-listed in Davidson County, Tennessee
- Richland Center Archeological District, Richland Center, Wisconsin, NRHP-listed in Richland County

== See also ==
- Richlands Historic District (disambiguation)
