= Armstrong House (Lumpkin, Georgia) =

- U.S. National Register of Historic Places
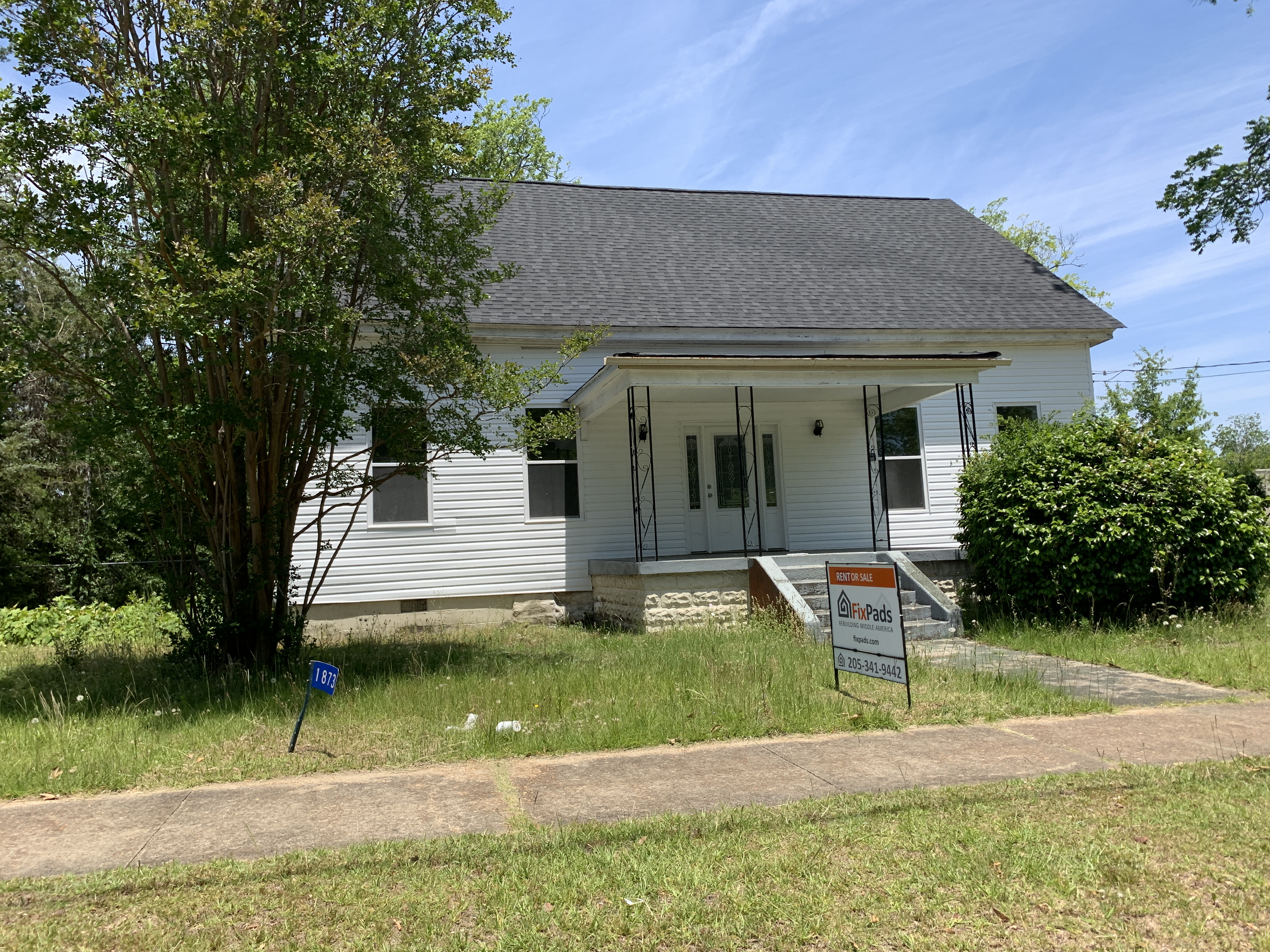

- Location within Georgia
- Location: Broad St., Lumpkin, Georgia
- Coordinates: 32°03′04″N 84°47′34″W
- Area: less than one acre
- Built: c. 1840
- Architectural style: Greek Revival
- MPS: Lumpkin Georgia MRA
- NRHP reference No.: 82002466
- Added to NRHP: June 29, 1982

The Armstrong House is a single-story Greek Revival-style historic house built around 1840 and located on Broad St. in Lumpkin, Georgia, United States. It was listed on the National Register of Historic Places in 1982.

It is a one-story Greek Revival house. It was deemed notable as one of the earliest surviving houses in Lumpkin, as "a good example of the more modest interpretation of prevailing architectural styles in the early 19th century ... occupied by less affluent or less ostentatious members of Lumpkin's 19th century merchant class."
