= Bush-Usher House =

- U.S. National Register of Historic Places
- Location within Georgia
- Location: E. Main St., Lumpkin, Georgia
- Coordinates: 32°02′58″N 84°47′29″W
- Area: less than one acre
- Built: 1910s
- Architectural style: Bungalow/craftsman
- MPS: Lumpkin Georgia MRA
- NRHP reference No.: 82002467
- Added to NRHP: June 29, 1982

Bush-Usher House Upload image June 29, 1982 (#82002467) E. Main St. 32°02′58″N 84°47′29″W Lumpkin

The Bush-Usher House, or Usher House, on E. Main St. in Lumpkin, Georgia, was built before 1919. It was listed on the National Register of Historic Places in 1982.

It is a one-story clapboarded bungalow with a square central hall plan, built upon a brick pier foundation. It has a balloon frame and a hipped roof; its eaves have exposed purlins; it has three interior chimneys.

It was home of J. Fred Usher, a local carpenter.

It was expanded by a shed addition to the rear around the 1940s, and in 1980 there was a c.1930 tin garage at the back.

It was listed as part of a study of historic resources in Lumpkin which led to National Register nomination of 15 historic districts and individual buildings.
