= Louvale, Georgia =

- Unincorporated community
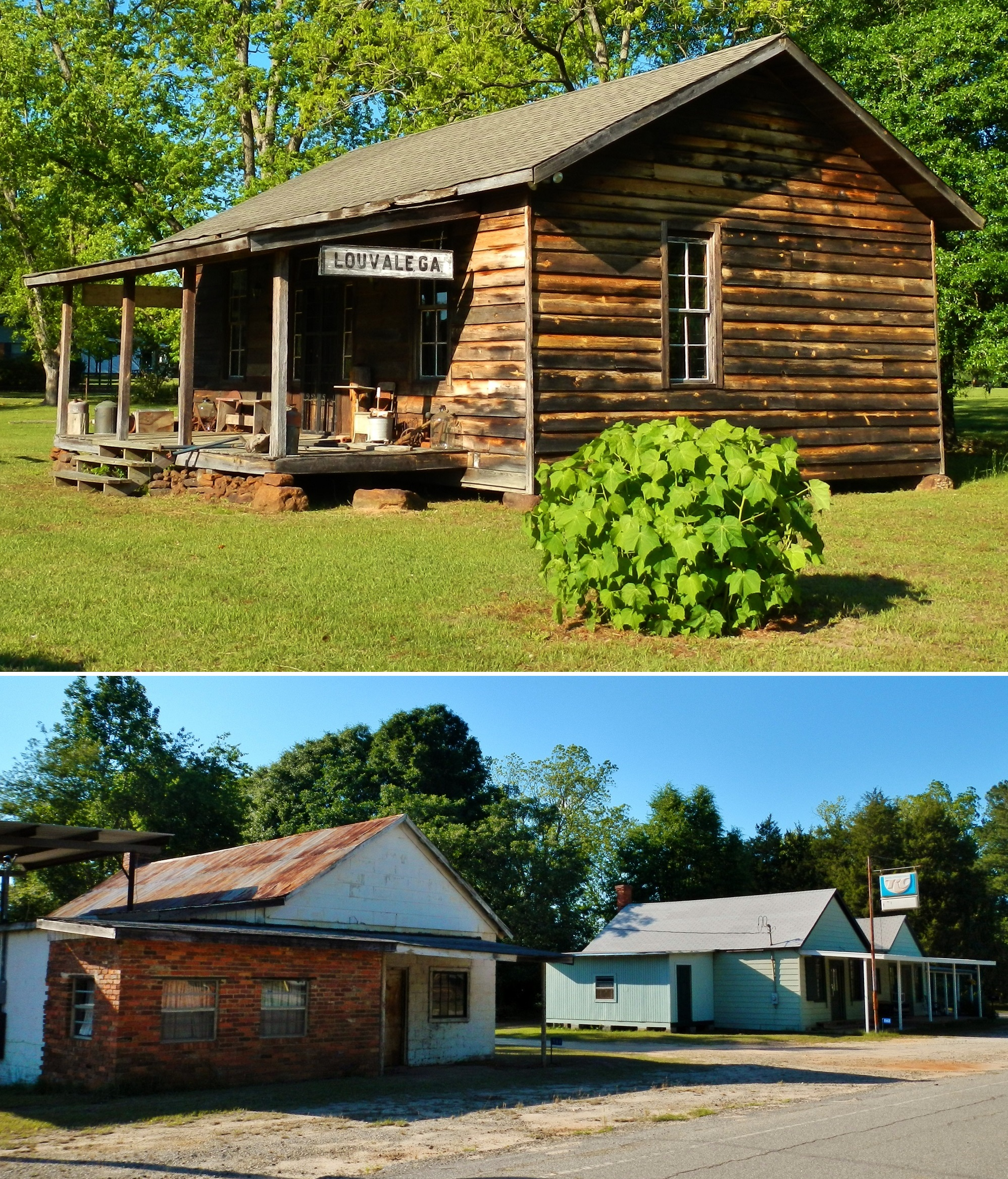
- Louvale, Georgia pictured in 2012.

- Location within Georgia
- Coordinates: 32°10′31″N 84°49′31″W
- Country: United States
- State: Georgia
- County: Stewart
- Elevation: 384 ft (117 m)
- Time zone: UTC-5 (Eastern (EST))
  - Summer (DST): UTC-4 (EDT)
- ZIP code: 31814
- Area code: 229
- GNIS feature ID: 356369

Louvale is an unincorporated community in Stewart County, Georgia, United States. The community is located along U.S. Route 27, 8.7 miles (14.0 km) north of Lumpkin. Louvale has a post office with ZIP code 31814.

== History ==
Originally named "Antioch", the town developing at the terminus of the Savannah, Americus, and Montgomery (Little SAM) Railroad was renamed "Louvale" in 1886.

The Georgia General Assembly incorporated Louvale as a town in 1893.

Located in the heart of Louvale, the Louvale Church Row District is a collection of historic buildings ranging in age from the 1850s through the early 1900s. Louvale Church Row was added to the National Register of Historic Places on April 11, 1986.

=== Antioch Institute ===
The Antioch Institute, built in the 1850s, the school was operated by the Antioch Primitive Baptist Church until it was sold to Stewart County in 1895. The building is believed to have been used for church services until the church building immediately next door to the school was erected for that purpose in 1885. The county operated the Louvale High School there until 1928 when the upper grades were transferred to Lumpkin. The elementary school remained in the building until 1942. The school is now used as the Louvale Community House which serves as the home for the Sybil and John B. Richardson School of Sacred Harp Singing.

== Gallery ==
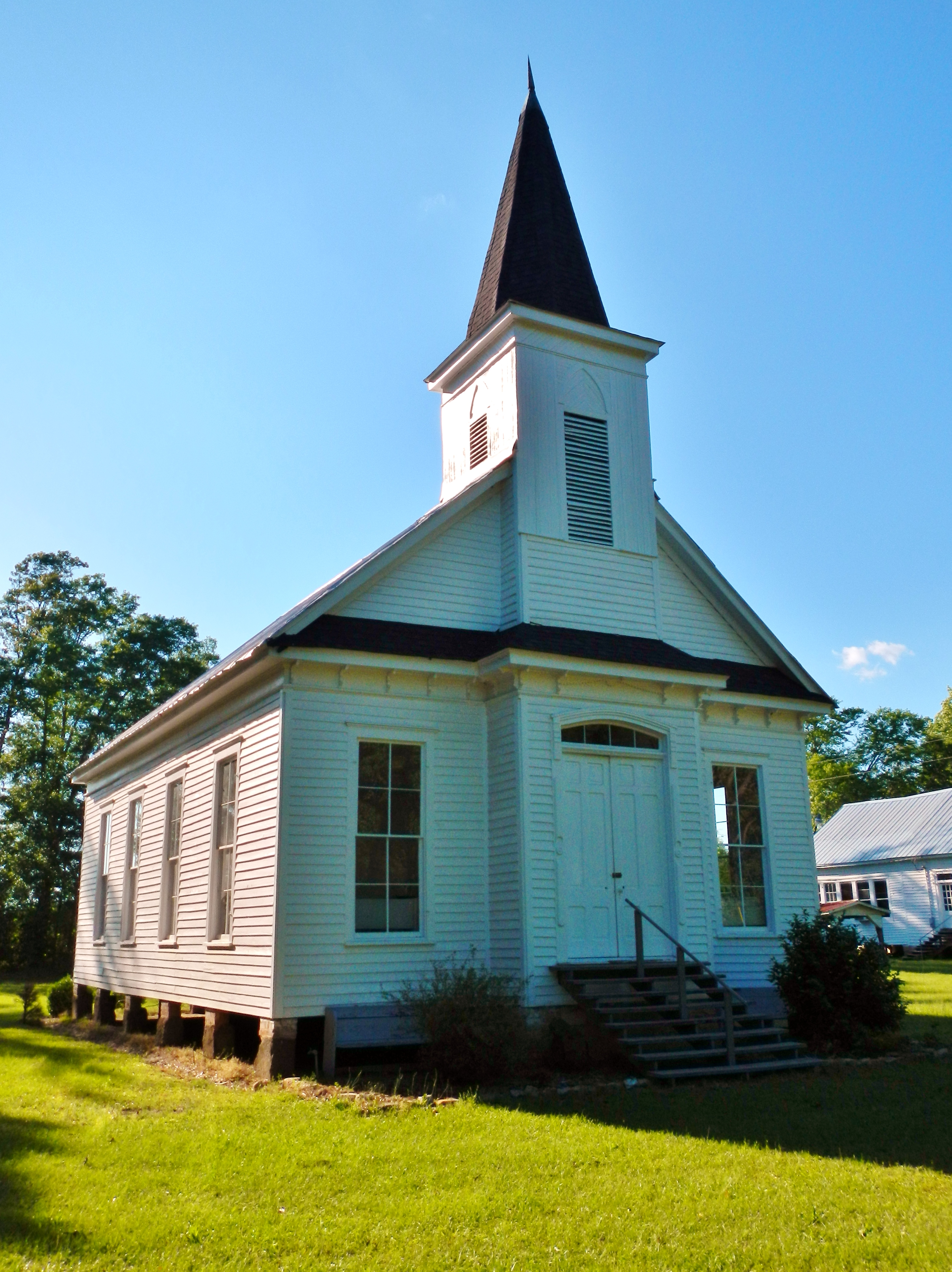
The Antioch Primitive Baptist Church was originally founded in 1832 in Pleasant Valley and moved to Louvale in 1851. Present church was erected in 1885 to replace the original log structure.

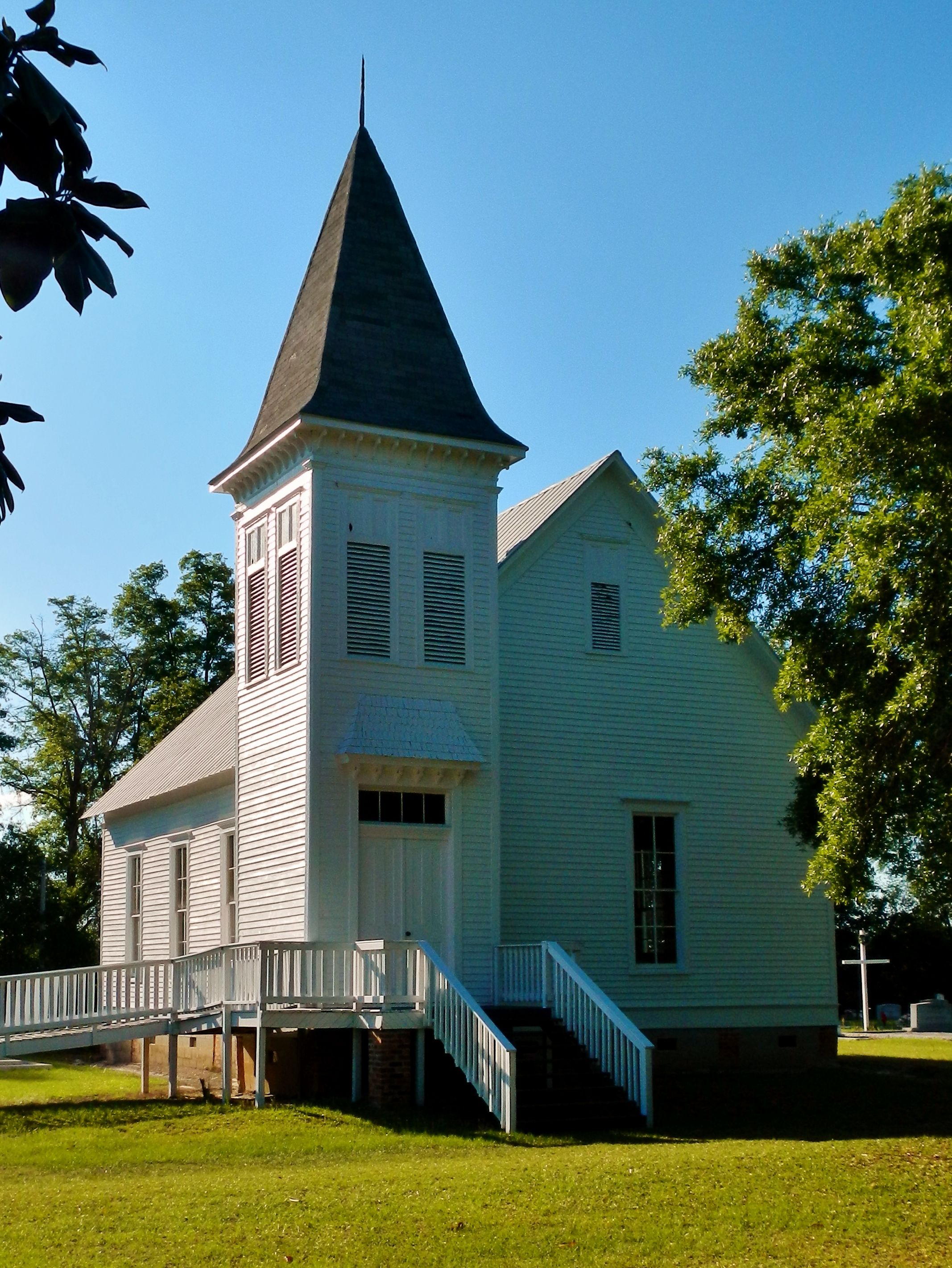
Marvin Methodist Church, founded 1830 in the nearby Green Hill community. Present building was erected in 1900.

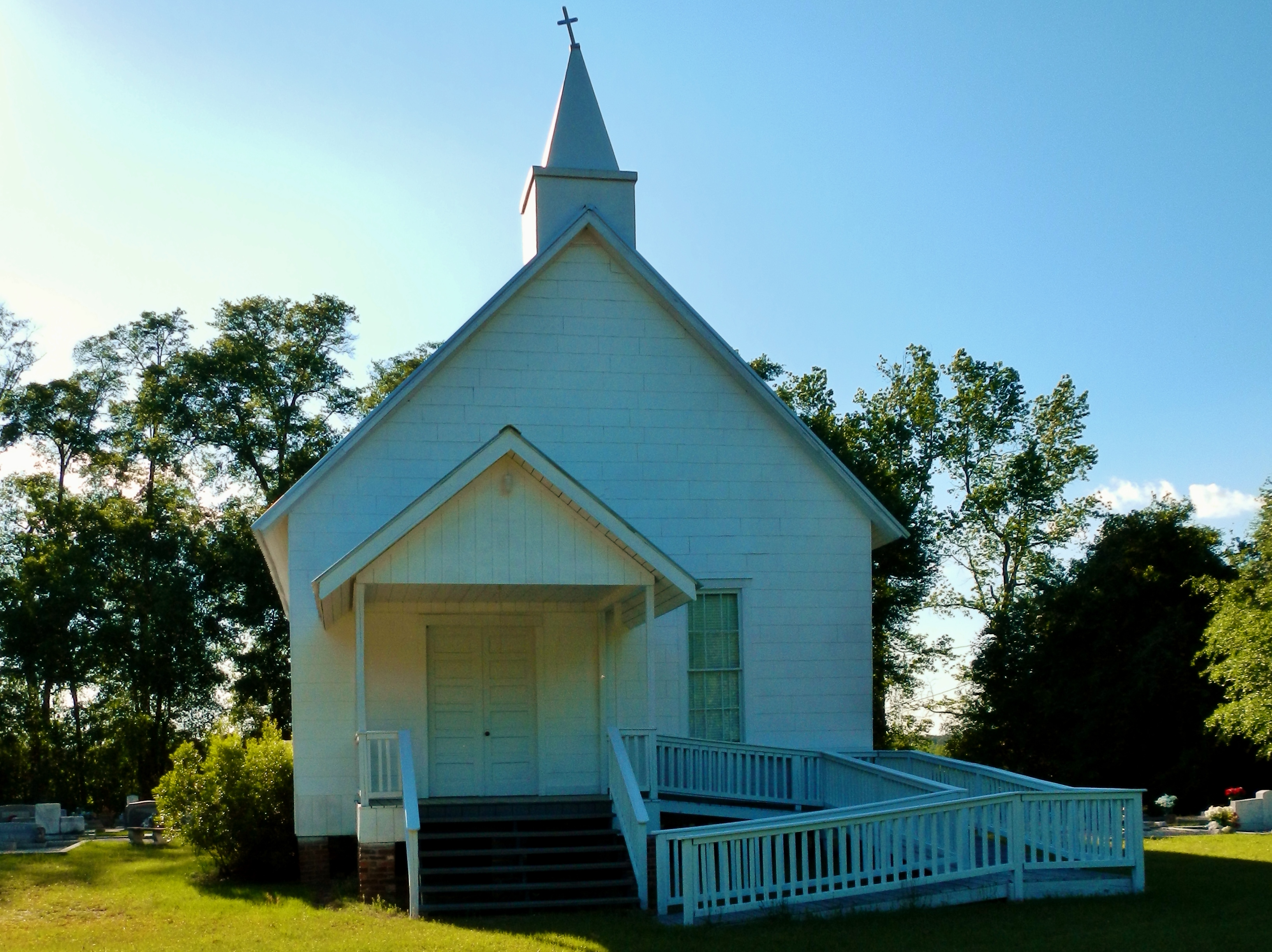
The New Hope Baptist Church was originally constituted in 1860 and moved to present building in 1901.

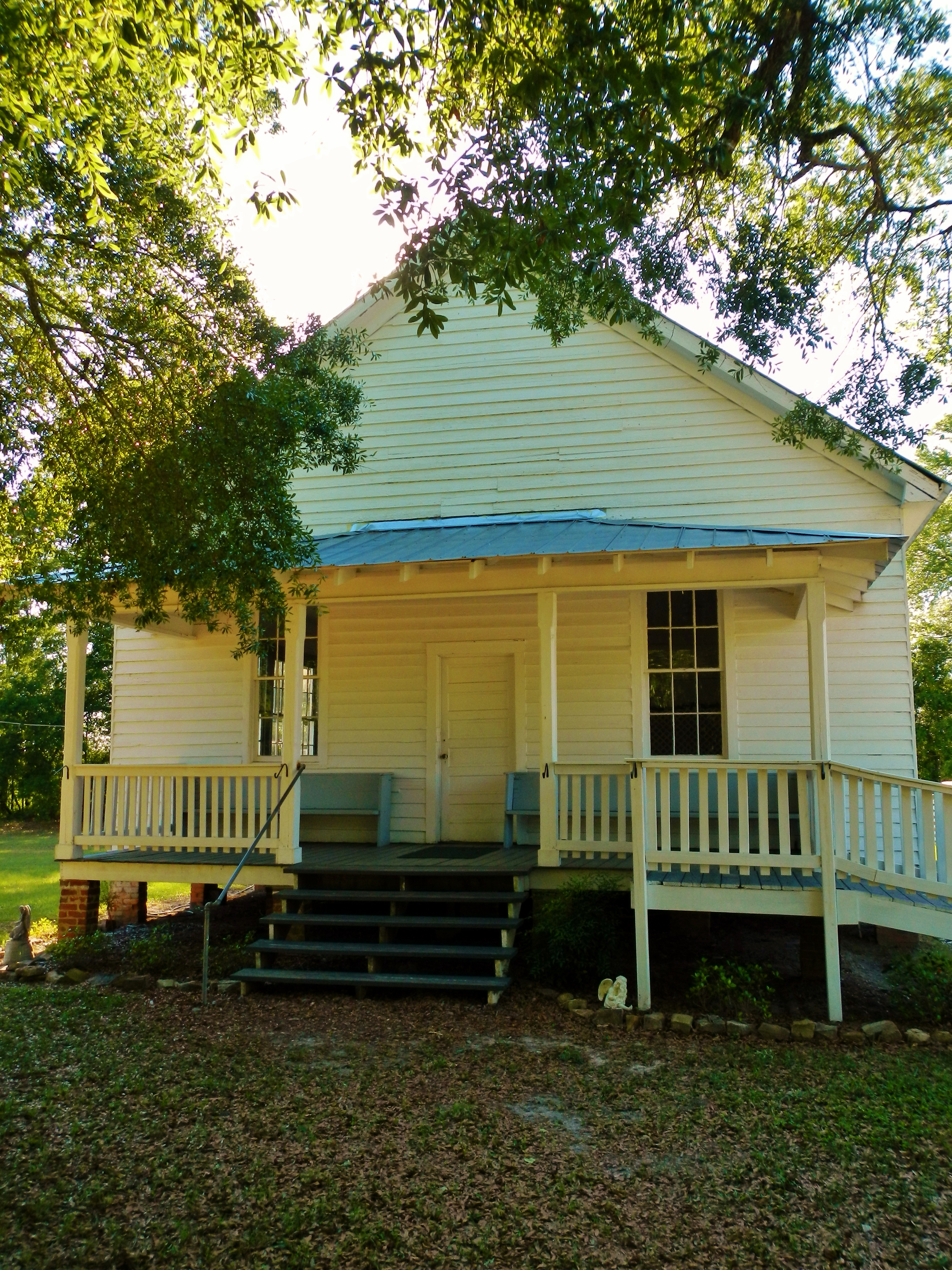
Antioch Institute
