= Uptown Residential Historic District =

Historic district in Georgia, United States

- U.S. National Register of Historic Places
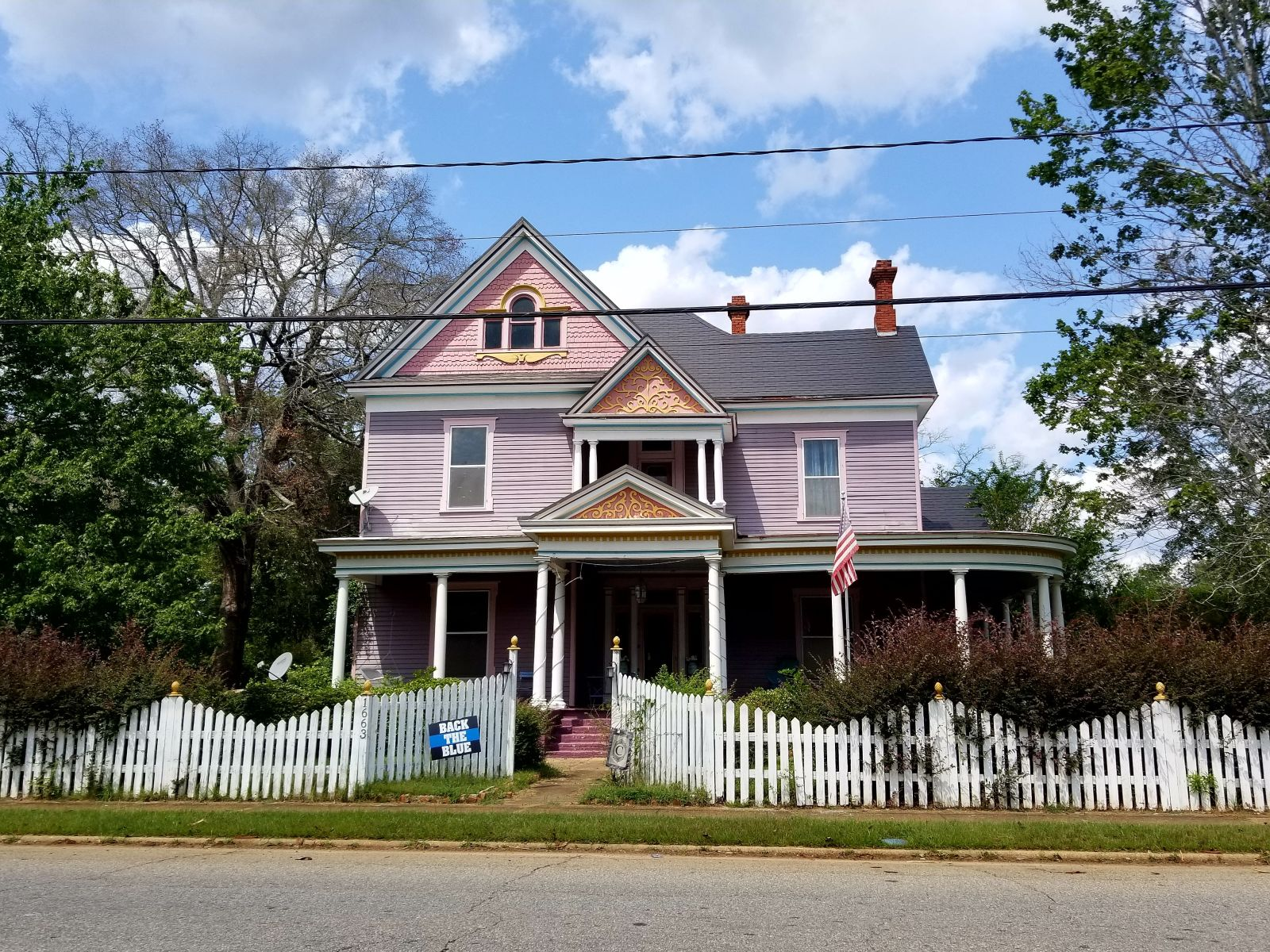
- 1663 Broad Street

- Location within Georgia
- Location: Broad and Main Sts., Lumpkin, Georgia
- Coordinates: 32°03′06″N 84°47′52″W
- Area: 34 acres (14 ha)
- Architectural style: Classical Revival, Greek Revival, Late Victorian
- MPS: Lumpkin Georgia MRA
- NRHP reference No.: 82002479
- Added to NRHP: June 29, 1982

The Uptown Residential Historic District, in Lumpkin, Georgia, is a 34 acres (14 ha) historic district which was listed on the National Register of Historic Places in 1982.

It includes several blocks of wood-framed residences and two churches along Main Street, Broad Street, Cherry Street and Chestnut Street in Lumpkin, with a few properties on Florence Street and Pine Street. The majority of the houses are one-story, but there are five two-story ones.
