= Lumpkin Commercial Historic District =

Historic district in Georgia, United States

- U.S. National Register of Historic Places
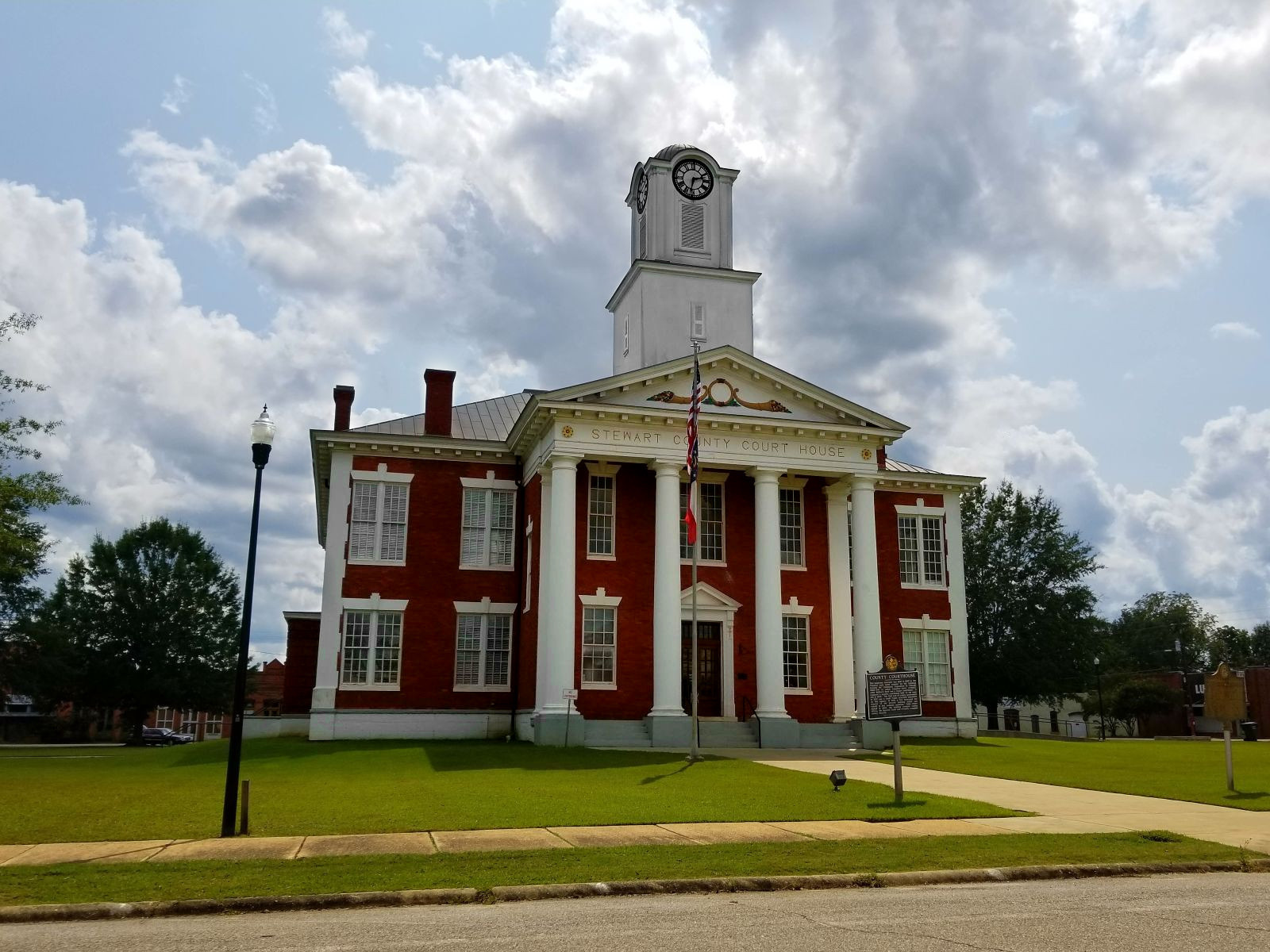
- Stewart County Courthouse

- Location within Georgia
- Location: Main, Broad, Cotton, and Mulberry Sts., Lumpkin, Georgia
- Coordinates: 32°03′00″N 84°47′41″W
- Area: 10 acres (4.0 ha)
- Architectural style: Greek Revival, Late Victorian
- MPS: Lumpkin Georgia MRA
- NRHP reference No.: 82002473
- Added to NRHP: June 29, 1982

The Lumpkin Commercial Historic District in Lumpkin, Georgia is a 10 acres (4.0 ha) historic district which was listed on the National Register of Historic Places in 1982. The listing included 18 contributing buildings.

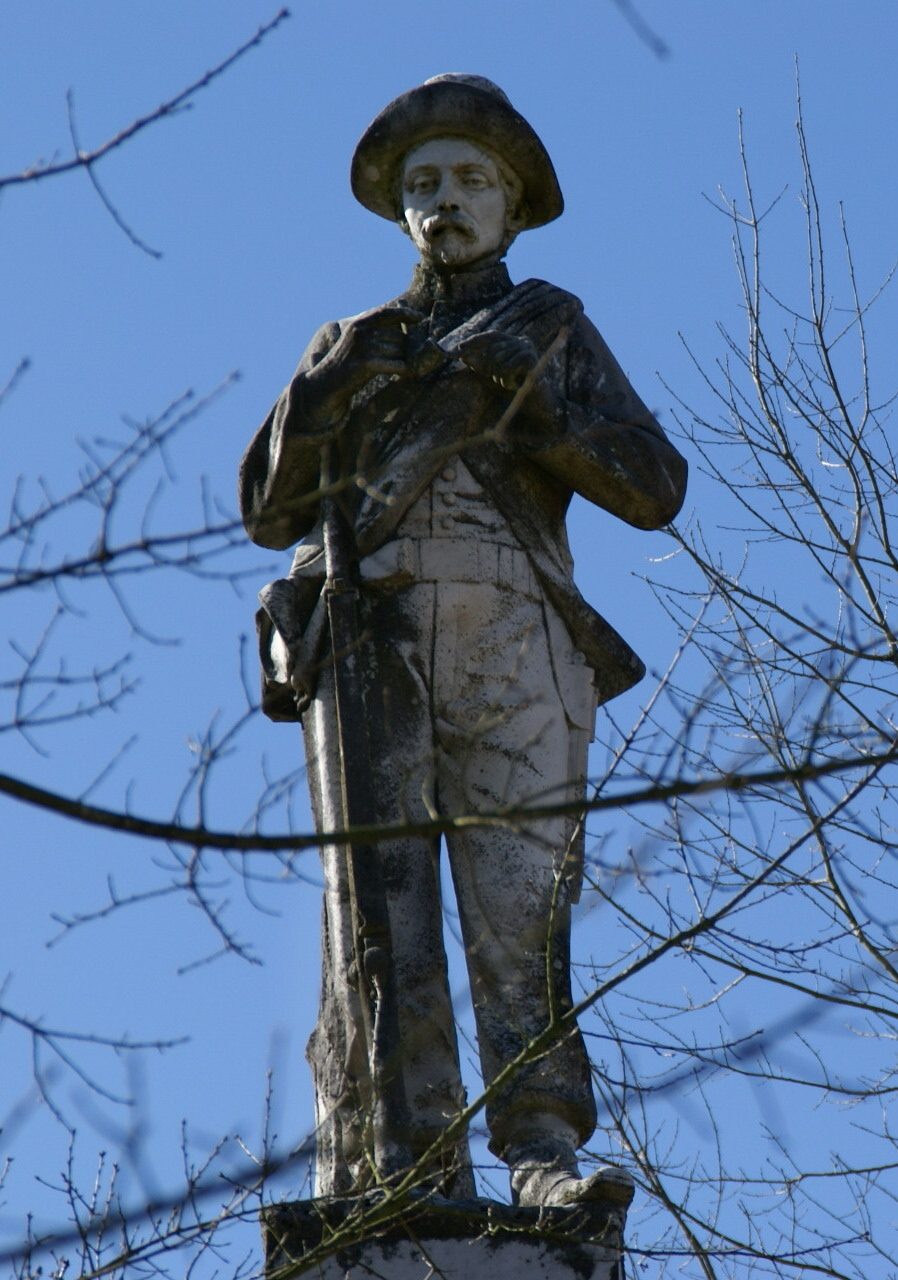
Statue on square

The district includes Lumpkin's courthouse square, with its monument to the Confederate dead, and the two-story brick Classical Revival Stewart County Courthouse (separately listed on the National Register in 1980).

It also includes commercial buildings on the streets which define the square: Main, Broad, Cotton, and Mulberry Streets, in the eight blocks surrounding the square.

It includes the separately listed Bedingfield Inn (NRHP-listed in 1973).
