= East Main Street Residential Historic District (Lumpkin, Georgia) =

Historic district in Georgia, United States

- U.S. National Register of Historic Places
- Location within Georgia
- Location: E. Main St., Lumpkin, Georgia
- Coordinates: 32°02′59″N 84°47′34″W
- Area: 3 acres (1.2 ha)
- Architectural style: Late Victorian, Queen Anne, Plantation Plain
- MPS: Lumpkin Georgia MRA
- NRHP reference No.: 82002469
- Added to NRHP: June 29, 1982

The East Main Street Residential Historic District in Lumpkin, Georgia is a 3 acres (1.2 ha) historic district which was listed on the National Register of Historic Places in 1982. The listing included five contributing buildings.

The district includes buildings on East Main Street near Elm Street. It includes a Plantation Plain-style cottage, two Victorian cottages, and a Queen Anne-style house.
