= Mathis House =

- U.S. National Register of Historic Places
- Location within Georgia
- Location: E. Main St., Lumpkin, Georgia
- Coordinates: 32°03′00″N 84°47′28″W
- Area: less than one acre
- Built: c.1840-45
- Architectural style: Plantation Plain
- MPS: Lumpkin Georgia MRA
- NRHP reference No.: 82002474
- Added to NRHP: June 29, 1982

The Mathis House, on E. Main St. in Lumpkin, Georgia, was built around 1840–45. It was listed on the National Register of Historic Places in 1982.

It is a two-story Plantation Plain house, with Greek Revival details. Its "ornate entrance on the first floor with flush tongue and groove siding, and multi-paned trabeated doorway, along with the second floor entrance with fluted pilasters, are among the most decorative found in Lumpkin."

It was one of four identical houses built within a 4 miles (6.4 km) radius; this is the only one surviving.

By 1899, it was home of school teacher Miss Ernie Stevens and an "Aunt Penny McCullough", of whom locals were supposedly afraid.

It was deemed "significant as a manifestation of the large but relatively plain farmhouses located on what were, at the time, the outskirts of Lumpkin."

It was listed as part of a study of historic resources in Lumpkin which led to National Register nomination of 15 historic districts and individual buildings.
