= Richlands Historic District =

Richlands Historic District may refer to:

- Richlands Historic District (Richlands, North Carolina), listed on the National Register of Historic Places (NRHP) in Onslow County, North Carolina
- Richlands Historic District (Richlands, Virginia), NRHP-listed in Tazewell County

== See also ==
- Richland Historic District (disambiguation)
