= John Cornbread Anderson =

American folk artist (active since 1995)

John "Cornbread" Anderson
- Born: Lumpkin, Georgia
- Known for: Folk Art

John "Cornbread" Anderson is an American folk artist from rural Lumpkin, Georgia. He is known for his paintings of animals, particularly the guinea fowl, with large eyes.

== Biography ==
Anderson grew up in the woods of the Mill Creek community in Lumpkin. He has held a variety of jobs, including being a butcher, a mechanic, a police officer, and manager of a farm. Both his mother and wife are visual artists. In 1995, he began to explore art by painting the animals (both from the farm and wild) and scenes he was so familiar with. He is Christian and has expressed concern with the loss of habitat for southern wildlife as Atlanta, Georgia, expands.

As of 2015, Anderson lives in North Georgia with his wife, Jana, and two sons, Poley and Isaac. His art has become his full-time job, and he has become a well-known artist in the world of Southern folk art.

== Style ==
Anderson's subject matter is based around wildlife as well as life on a farm. "Fox, quail and guinea hens are among his favorite subjects but raccoon, deer and fish sneak in from time to time." He uses a variety of materials to paint on, including metal, wood, cardboard, and canvas. His work is distinguishable from other artists because his animals have large, round eyes. He "uses a vibrant palette and paints in an energetic, strong style..."
