= Pigtail Alley Historic District =

Historic district in Georgia, United States

- U.S. National Register of Historic Places
- Location within Georgia
- Location: Old Chestnut Rd., Lumpkin, Georgia
- Coordinates: 32°02′49″N 84°48′01″W
- Area: 22 acres (8.9 ha)
- Architectural style: Classical Revival, Greek Revival, Late Victorian
- MPS: Lumpkin Georgia MRA
- NRHP reference No.: 82002475
- Added to NRHP: June 29, 1982

Pigtail Alley Historic District in Lumpkin, Georgia is a 22 acres (8.9 ha) historic district which was listed on the National Register of Historic Places in 1982.

It runs along both sides of Old Chestnut Road and includes small cottages and large plantation houses.
