= Stewart County Courthouse =

- U.S. National Register of Historic Places
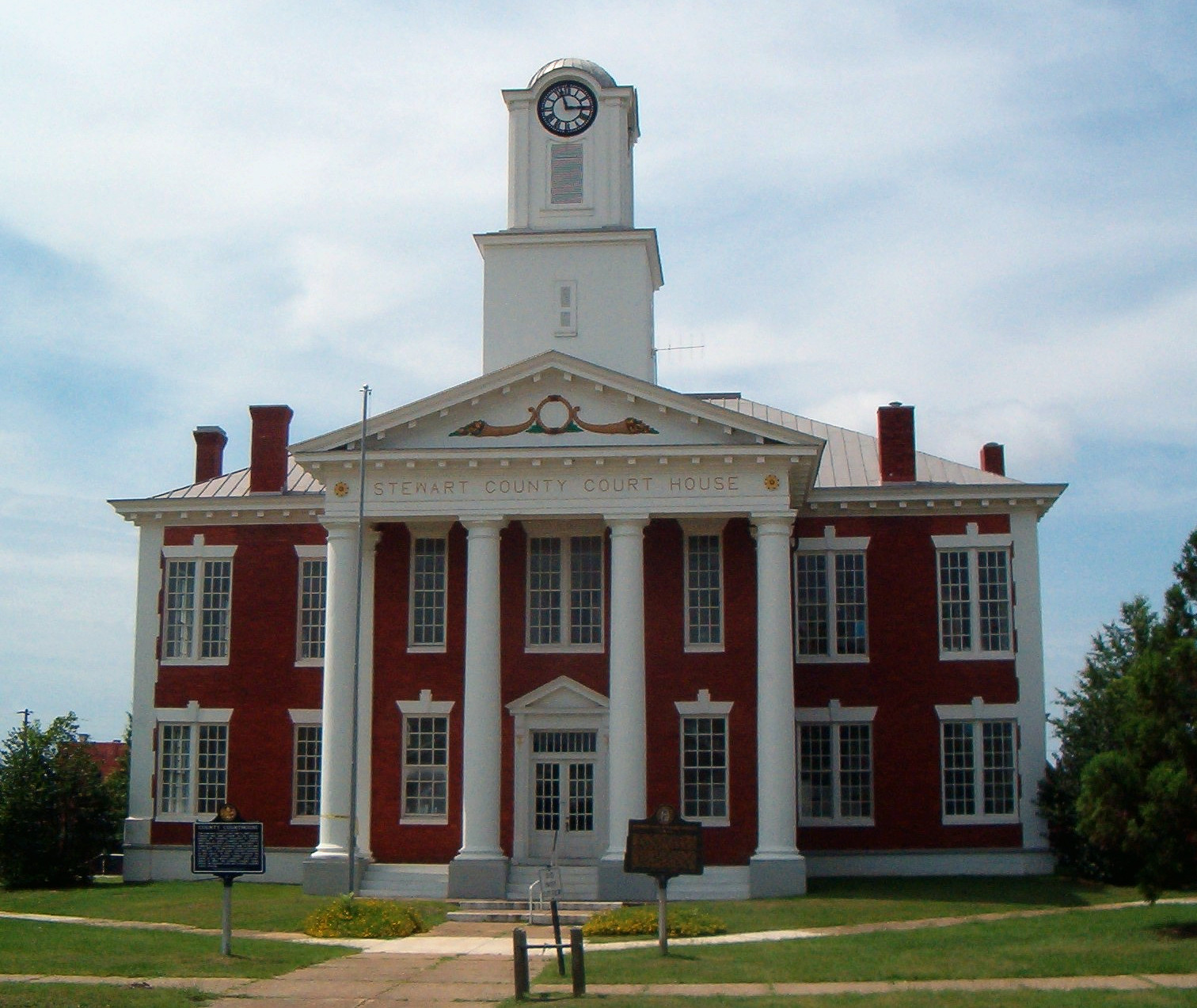
- North Facade and Clock Tower - 2017

- Location within Georgia
- Location: Courthouse Sq., Lumpkin, Georgia
- Coordinates: 32°03′01″N 84°47′40″W
- Area: 3 acres (1.2 ha)
- Built: 1923
- Architectural style: Classical Revival
- Part of: Lumpkin Commercial Historic District (ID82002473)
- MPS: Georgia County Courthouses TR
- NRHP reference No.: 80001234
- Added to NRHP: September 18, 1980

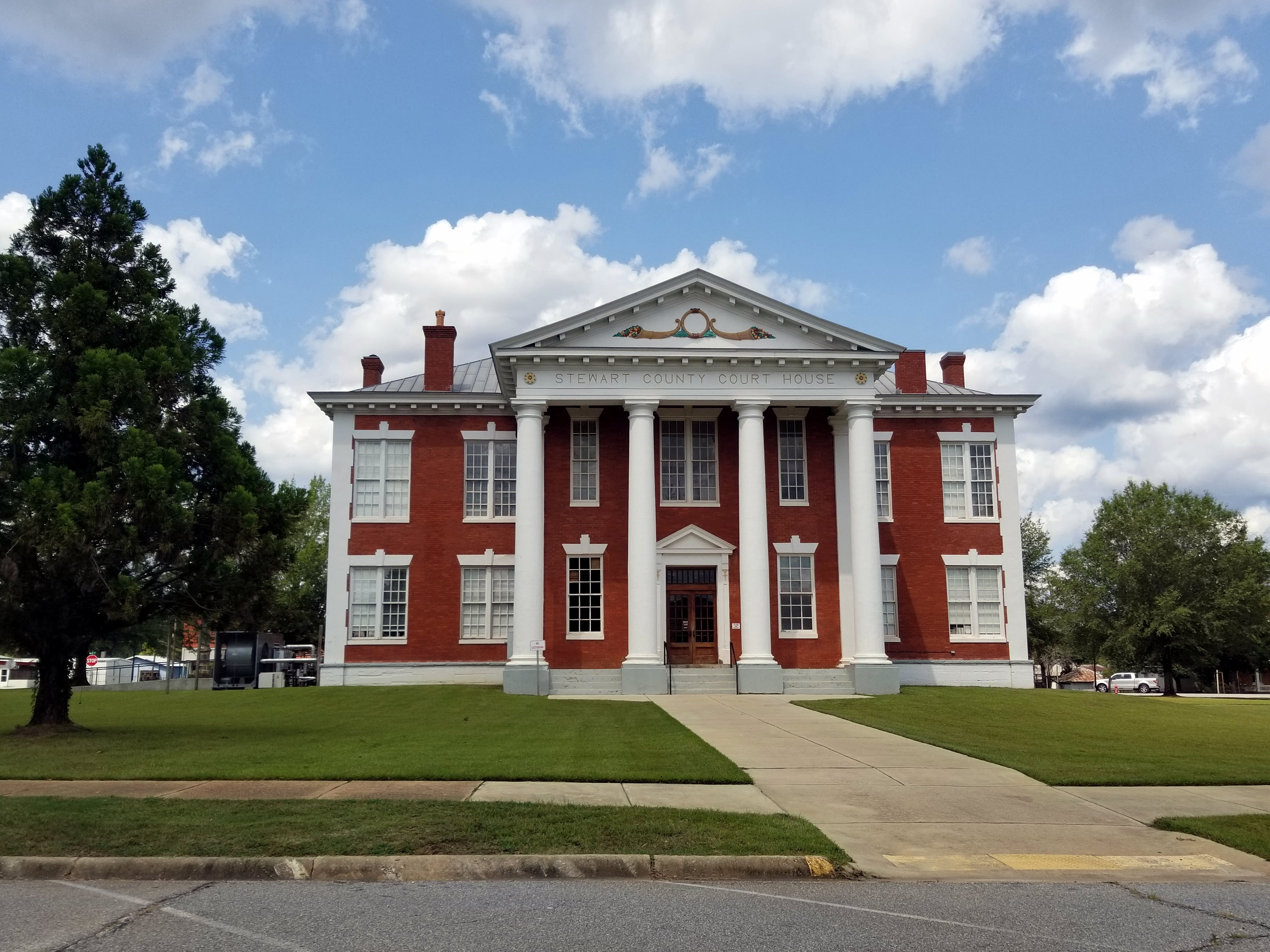
Stewart County Courthouse - South Facade - 2017

The Stewart County Courthouse, in Lumpkin, Georgia, is a historic courthouse built in 1923 for Stewart County, Georgia. It was listed on the National Register of Historic Places in 1980.

It was built to replace the previous courthouse, built in 1895, which was burned in 1922. It is a two-story brick Classical Revival-style courthouse. Its front and rear facades have identical projecting pedimented porticoes with four Tuscan columns. The building's original cupola and clocktower have been lost. It is at the center of the Lumpkin Commercial Historic District.
