= Richland Historic District (Richland, Michigan) =

- U.S. National Register of Historic Places
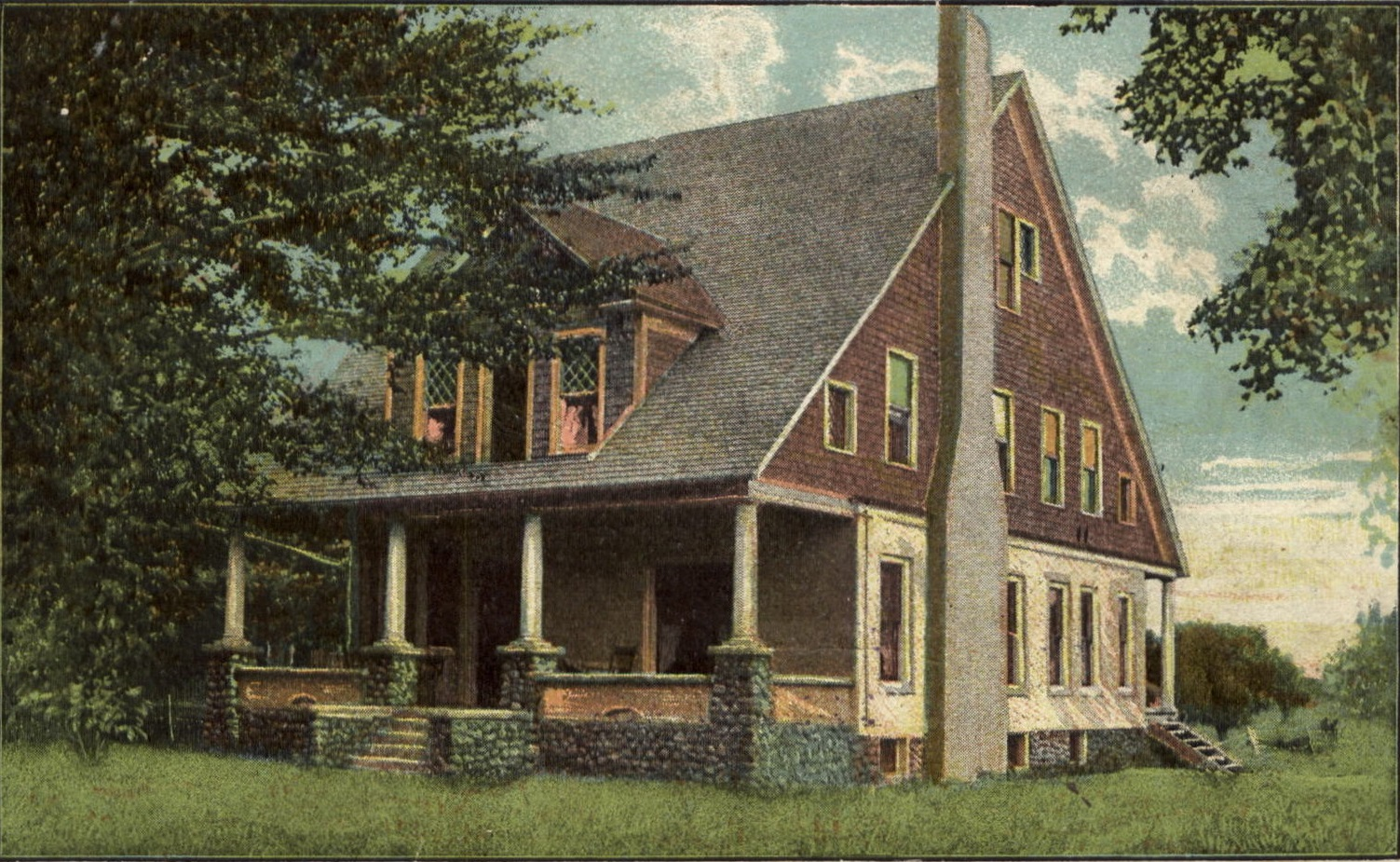
- Kedzie House, c. 1906

- Location within Michigan Location within the United States
- Interactive map
- Location: 7567-8020 N. 32nd, 8023-8047 Church, 8951-8965 Park Sts., 8650-8118 E. D Ave., 8760-8905 Gull Rd., 9057-9063 RR, Richland, Michigan
- Coordinates: 42°22′27″N 85°27′26″W
- Area: 97 acres (39 ha)
- Built: 1834
- Architectural style: Queen Anne, Italianate, Greek Revival
- NRHP reference No.: 97000278
- Added to NRHP: April 11, 1997

The Richland Historic District is a commercial and residential historic district located in the center of Richland, Michigan, containing structures near the intersection of 32nd Street, D Avenue, and Gull Road (including those on Church, Park, and Railroad Streets). The district was listed on the National Register of Historic Places in 1997.

== History ==
In 1830, a group of white settlers arrived to farm the area that was then known as "Gull Prairie". In 1832 and 1833, small settlements were platted to the north and south of what is now Richland. Neither attracted many inhabitants, but instead newcomers settled along the crossroads in between. A small public square at the corner was platted out, and in use as a public gathering place by the mid-1830s. The first church building was constructed in 1834, with the first school building following in 1837, and the settlement served as the center of a primarily agricultural community for many decades.

Richland was incorporated in 1871, and in 1883 the Michigan and Ohio Railroad built a line through the village. Richland then served as a small transportation hub for agricultural products, and slowly grew in size through the latter part of the 19th century. However, the expansion of the village took place almost exclusively along the main roads (32nd Street, D Avenue, and Gull Road), maintaining the pattern of streets established in the 1830s. The town center represented by this district was substantially built out by the 1910s, with little later infill.

== Description ==
The Richland Historic District is an unplatted agricultural community centered around a village square. The community retains its historic street pattern. Commercial and community buildings are located near the square, with residential structures on the outlying streets. There are 66 structures within the district that contribute to its historic character, the majority of which were built between 1860 and 1900. Nearly all are wood frame structures, and are vernacular representations of local styles. Most of the structures are residential; the district additionally includes two churches, two schools, an Oddfellows Hall, a library, and a bank building. Additional commercial structures in Richland are either modern or significantly altered, and do not contribute to the historic character of the district.

Significant structures in the neighborhood include:

- Uriah & Maria Upjohn House (7799 N. 32nd St. ) Constructed in 1852 and 1859, this is a two-story Italianate structure with a hipped roof, coupled to a 1 1/2-story gable front Greek Revival rear all covered with wooden clapboards. Uriah Upjohn was a pioneering physician whose sons founded the Upjohn Pharmaceutical Company in 1885.
- Purigraski House (8883 E. D Ave.) Built in about 1895, this is a well-preserved 2 1/2-story hipped roof American Foursquare house. It is clad with wooden clapboard siding and has three bellcast hipped dormers and a wide hipped roof front porch with stone piers.
- Oddfellows Hall (8960 E. D Ave.) Built in 1891, this is a two-story, gable-front commercial structure clad with wooden clapboard. It was originally built to house a drug store on the first floor and the Independent Order of Odd Fellows Hall on the second.
- Union Bank (8972 E. D Ave.) built in about 1870, this is a 1 1/2-story gable-front brick bank. The original Union Bank failed in 1907.
- William and Zoe Kenzie House (9024 E. D Ave.) Built in about 1907, this large, 2 1/2-story side-gable Colonial house has a brick lower floor with painted asphalt shingles above. The house has a wide front porch with cobblestone aprons and piers. Dr. Kenzie practiced medicine and ran a drug store in Richland into the 1920s.
- Jane Giddings House (9100 E. D Ave.) built in about 1890 for Jane Giddings, whose husband William was the first person to die in the township in 1831. Her son Marsh Giddings was a politician who later became governor of the New Mexico Territory.
- 1884 School (9153 E. D Ave.) A two-story, T-plan gable front brick building with symmetrical facades.
- Presbyterian Church (8047 Church St.) Built in 1861, this is a temple-front Greek Revival church, with a square-plan tower which has a square belfry and a pyramid roof. The sanctuary has round-topped windows. The church is clad with clapboard, except for the upper part of the steeple, which has flush boards. A modern addition is built behind the church.
- Ladies Library (now the Richland Community Library) (8951 Park St.) Built in 1907, this is a one-story, hipped-roof, symmetrical brick building with centered gabled portico.
- Stephen Patrick House (8807 Gull Rd.) Built in c. 1865, this is a two-story, hipped-roof Italianate house with tall windows and a wide front porch. It was built by Stephen Patrick, a carpenter who helped to construct the Presbyterian Church. The house has been converted to use as offices.
- Methodist Episcopal Church (now the Richland Community Hall) (8905 Gull Rd.) Built in 1891, this is a gable-roof, stuccoed building with a (now truncated) corner tower above the entrance. The building was used by the Methodist Episcopal congregation from 1891 to 1926, and in 1929 was converted to the Community Hall.
- Rural Agricultural School (Gull Rd.) Built in 1924, this is a two-story, T-plan brick school. A 1936 addition was constructed with WPA funds. In 1998, the building caught fire, and was demolished.
