= Richland, Georgia =

- City
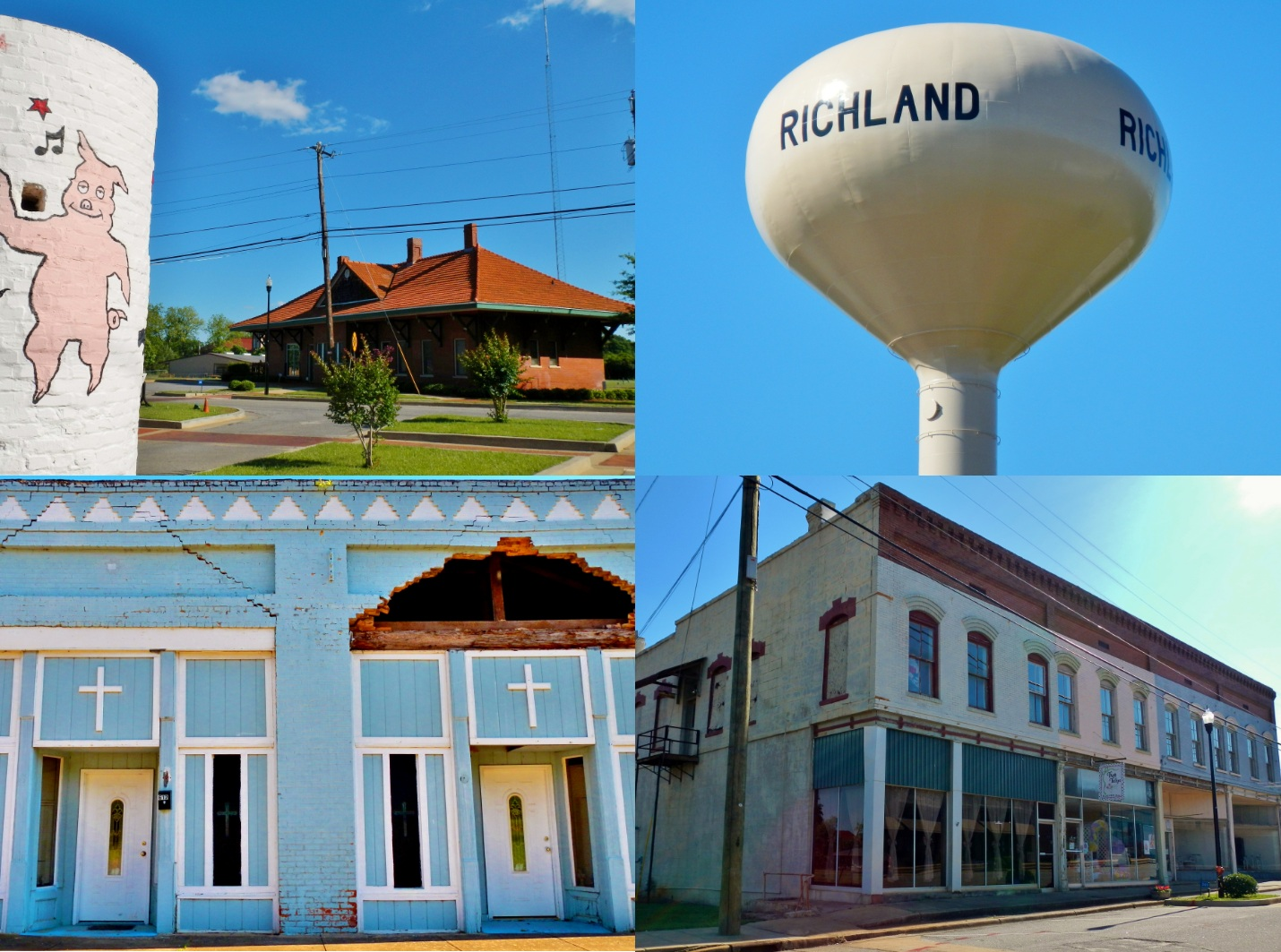

- Location in Stewart County and the state of Georgia
- Coordinates: 32°5′19″N 84°39′50″W
- Country: United States
- State: Georgia
- County: Stewart

Area
  - Total: 3.24 sq mi (8.40 km^{2})
  - Land: 3.20 sq mi (8.29 km^{2})
  - Water: 0.046 sq mi (0.12 km^{2})
- Elevation: 607 ft (185 m)

Population (2020)
  - Total: 1,370
  - Density: 428.1/sq mi (165.28/km^{2})
- Time zone: UTC-5 (Eastern (EST))
  - Summer (DST): UTC-4 (EDT)
- ZIP code: 31825
- Area code: 229
- FIPS code: 13-65016
- GNIS feature ID: 0356496
- Website: https://richlandga.org/

Richland is a city in Stewart County, Georgia, United States. Per the 2020 census, the population was 1,370.

== History ==
The community took its name from the local Richland Baptist Church, the name of which most likely is a transfer from Richland, South Carolina, the native home of a large share of the first settlers. The Georgia General Assembly incorporated Richland in 1889.

== Geography ==
Richland is located along U.S. Route 280 and Georgia State Route 520 (known as South Georgia Parkway). U.S. Route 280 and Georgia 520 lead northwest 36 miles (58 km) to Columbus. The two highways separate in the city, with U.S. Route 280 leading east 29 miles (47 km) to Americus and Georgia 520 leading southeast 52 miles (84 km) to Albany.

According to the United States Census Bureau, the city has a total area of 4.2 square miles (11 km^{2}), of which 4.2 square miles (11 km^{2}) is land and 0.04 square miles (0.10 km^{2}) (0.48%) is water.

== Demographics ==
Historical population
Census	Pop.	Note	%±
1890	457		—
1900	1,014		121.9%
1910	1,250		23.3%
1920	1,529		22.3%
1930	1,577		3.1%
1940	1,497		−5.1%
1950	1,571		4.9%
1960	1,472		−6.3%
1970	1,823		23.8%
1980	1,802		−1.2%
1990	1,668		−7.4%
2000	1,794		7.6%
2010	1,473		−17.9%
2020	1,370		−7.0%
U.S. Decennial Census; 1850-1870 1870-1880; 1890-1910 1920-1930; 1940 1950 1960; 1970 1980 1990; 2000 2010 2020

=== Racial and ethnic composition ===
Richland city, Georgia – Racial and Ethnic Composition (NH = Non-Hispanic) Note: the US Census treats Hispanic/Latino as an ethnic category. This table excludes Latinos from the racial categories and assigns them to a separate category. Hispanics/Latinos may be of any race.
Race / Ethnicity	Pop 2010	Pop 2020	% 2010	% 2020
White alone (NH)	408	345	27.70%	25.18%
Black or African American alone (NH)	1,013	967	68.77%	70.58%
Native American or Alaska Native alone (NH)	3	2	0.20%	0.15%
Asian alone (NH)	8	4	0.54%	0.29%
Pacific Islander alone (NH)	0	0	0.00%	0.00%
Some Other Race alone (NH)	0	0	0.00%	0.00%
Mixed Race/Multi-Racial (NH)	8	40	0.54%	2.92%
Hispanic or Latino (any race)	33	12	2.24%	0.88%
Total	1,473	1,370	100.00%	100.00%

=== 2020 census ===
As of the 2020 census, Richland had a population of 1,370. The median age was 46.6 years. 20.1% of residents were under the age of 18 and 21.5% of residents were 65 years of age or older. For every 100 females there were 82.2 males, and for every 100 females age 18 and over there were 82.8 males age 18 and over.

0.0% of residents lived in urban areas, while 100.0% lived in rural areas.

There were 565 households in Richland, of which 27.4% had children under the age of 18 living in them. Of all households, 25.0% were married-couple households, 22.1% were households with a male householder and no spouse or partner present, and 47.8% were households with a female householder and no spouse or partner present. About 36.4% of all households were made up of individuals and 15.8% had someone living alone who was 65 years of age or older.

There were 679 housing units, of which 16.8% were vacant. The homeowner vacancy rate was 1.4% and the rental vacancy rate was 8.6%.

== Notable people ==
- Birthplace of Lillian Gordy Carter, mother of former president of the United States Jimmy Carter
- Birthplace of Jerry C. Davis, controversial president of College of the Ozarks
- Jarvis Jones, retired NFL linebacker for the Pittsburgh Steelers
- Bernice Brown McCullar, educator and writer
- Steve Sanders, child actor and vocalist for Oak Ridge Boys

== Gallery ==
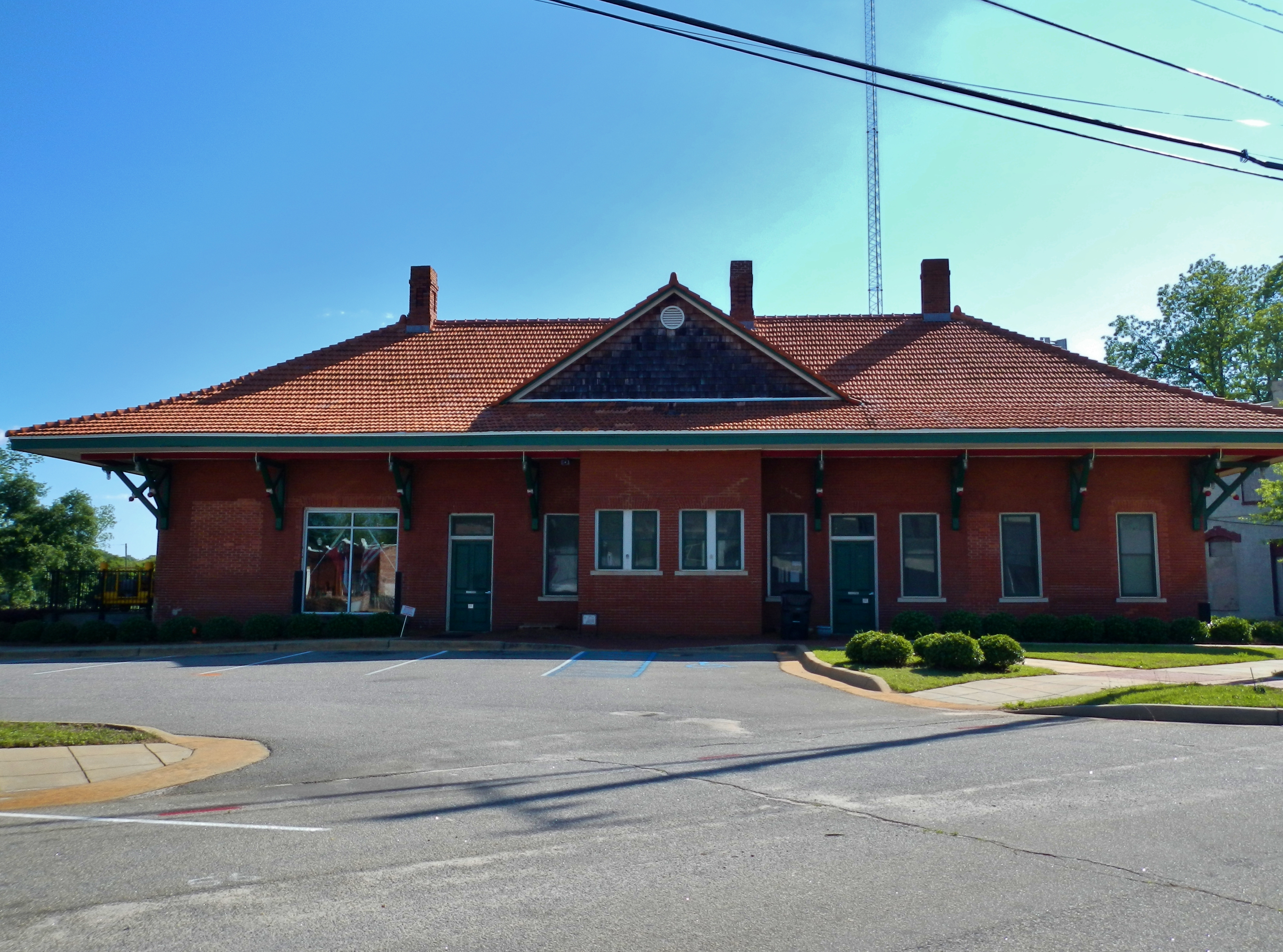
Built in the 1890s and renovated in 2008, the Richland Depot now serves as the city hall. The building was listed on the National Register of Historic Places as a contributing property to the Richland Historic District on May 5, 1986.

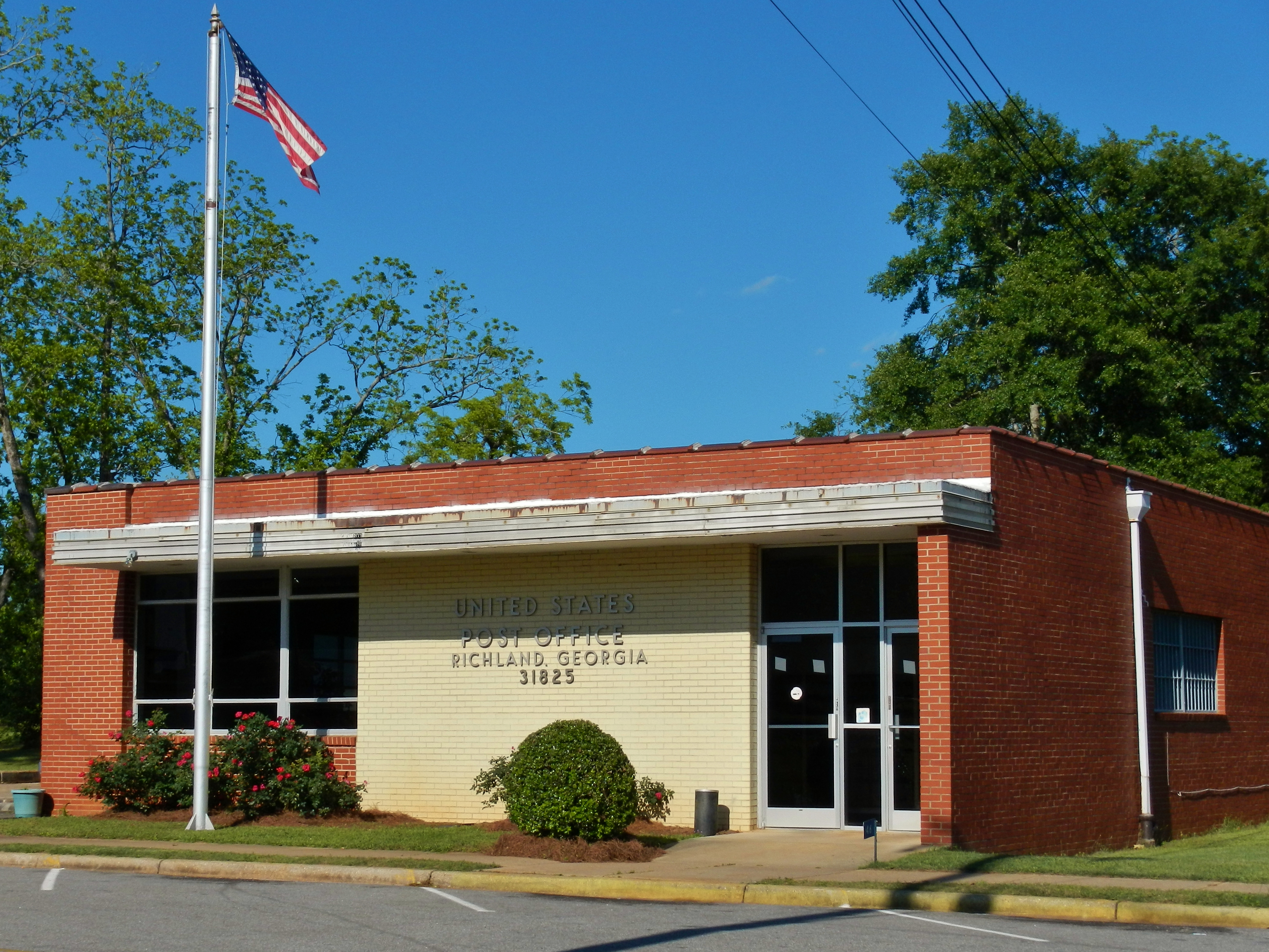
Richland Post Office (ZIP code: 31825)

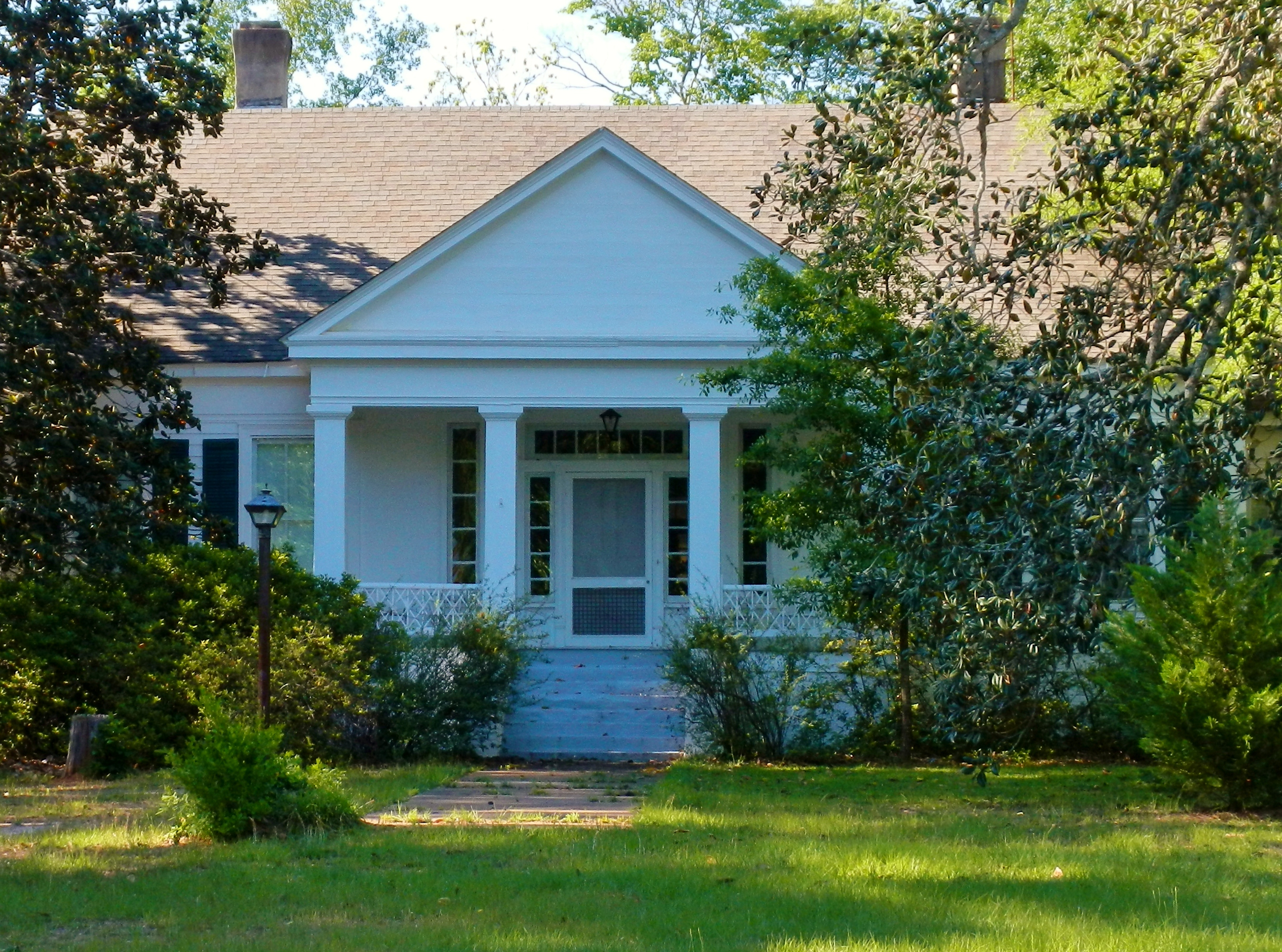
East of Richland, the Nathaniel Prothro Plantation was the largest cotton plantation in Stewart County at the beginning of the Civil War. The Greek Revival main house was built by 1851 by Dan E. Ponder. It was listed on the National Register of Historic Places on May 2, 1985.

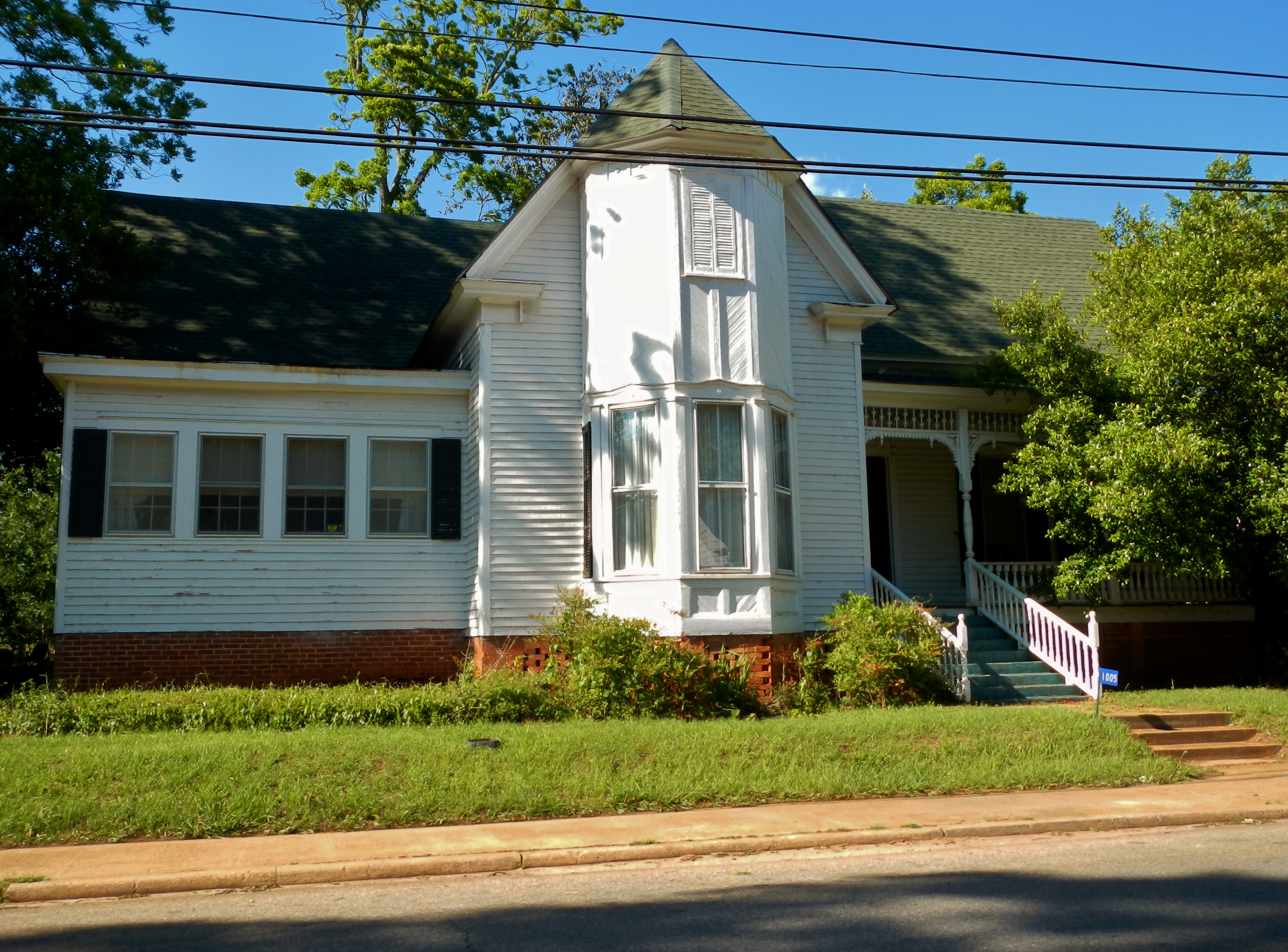
The Dr. Thomas B. Miller House was listed on the National Register of Historic Places on March 2, 1988

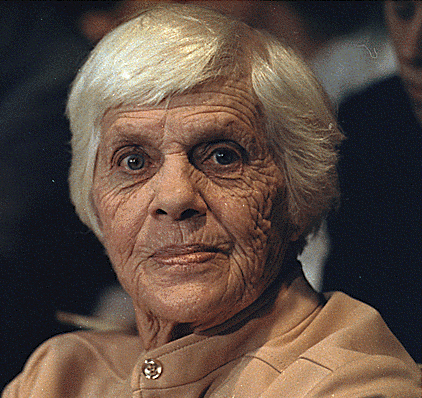
Bessie Lillian Gordy Carter, mother of Jimmy Carter, 39th President of the United States, was born and raised in Richland.
