= Richland Historic District (Richland, Georgia) =

Historic district in Georgia, United States

- U.S. National Register of Historic Places
- U.S. Historic district
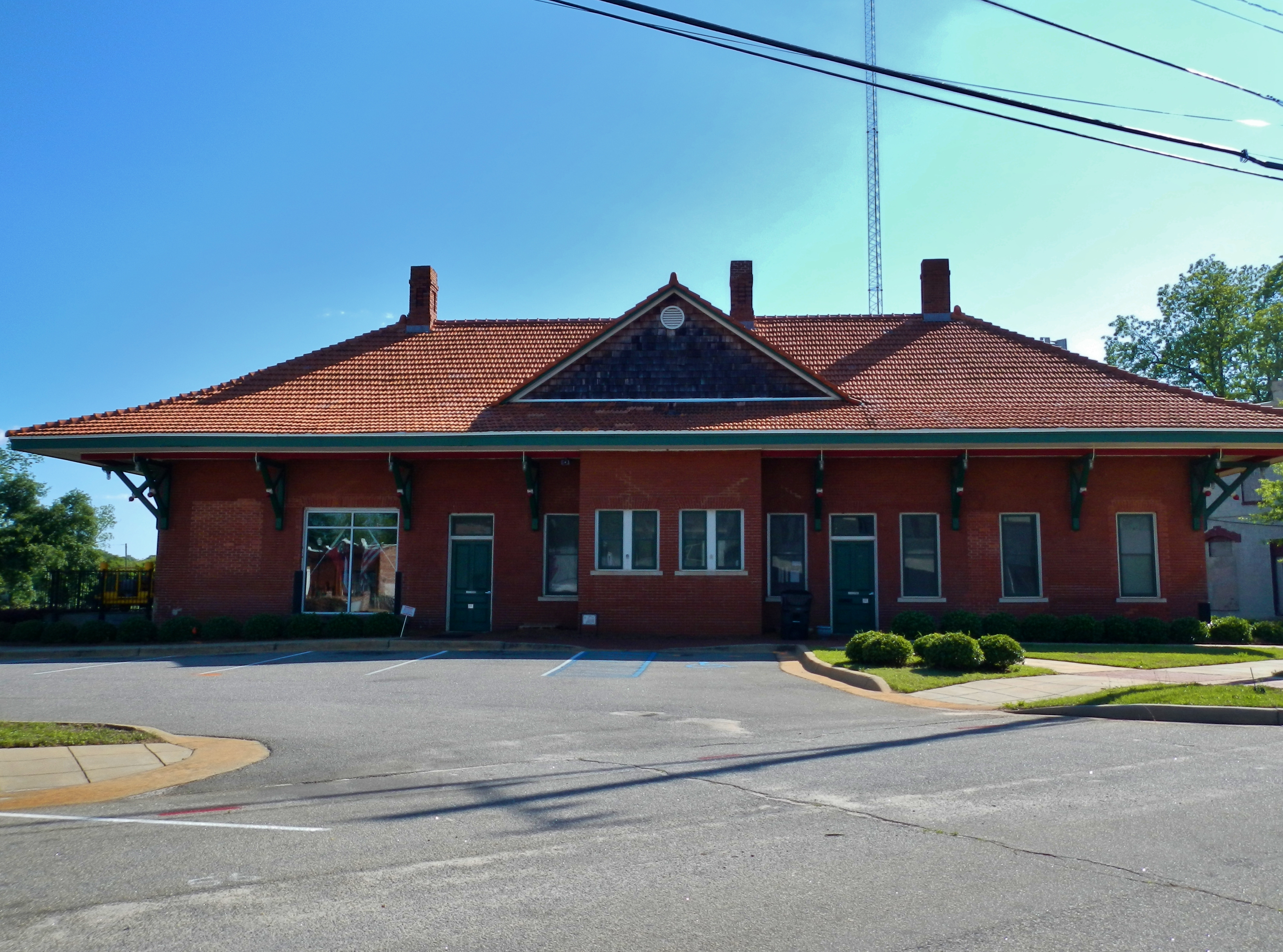
- Built in the late 1800s and renovated in 2008, the Richland Depot now serves as Richland's City Hall.

- Location within Georgia Location within the United States
- Location: Roughly bounded by Ponder, Harmony, Broad and Olemen, and Wali Streets, Richland, Georgia
- Coordinates: 32°5′27″N 84°39′45″W
- Architectural style: Late 19th And Early 20th Century American Movements, Late 19th And 20th Century Revivals, Late Victorian
- NRHP reference No.: 86001021
- Added to NRHP: May 5, 1986

The Richland Historic District is a historic district in Richland, Georgia that was listed on the National Register of Historic Places (NRHP) in 1986. It includes the historic commercial center of Richland and residential areas around it. Architectural styles of houses, commercial buildings, and institutional buildings in the district include Greek Revival, Victorian Eclectic, Neoclassical, and Craftsman/Bungalow.

The district includes the Smith-Alston House, which is separately listed on the NRHP.

== Contributing Properties ==
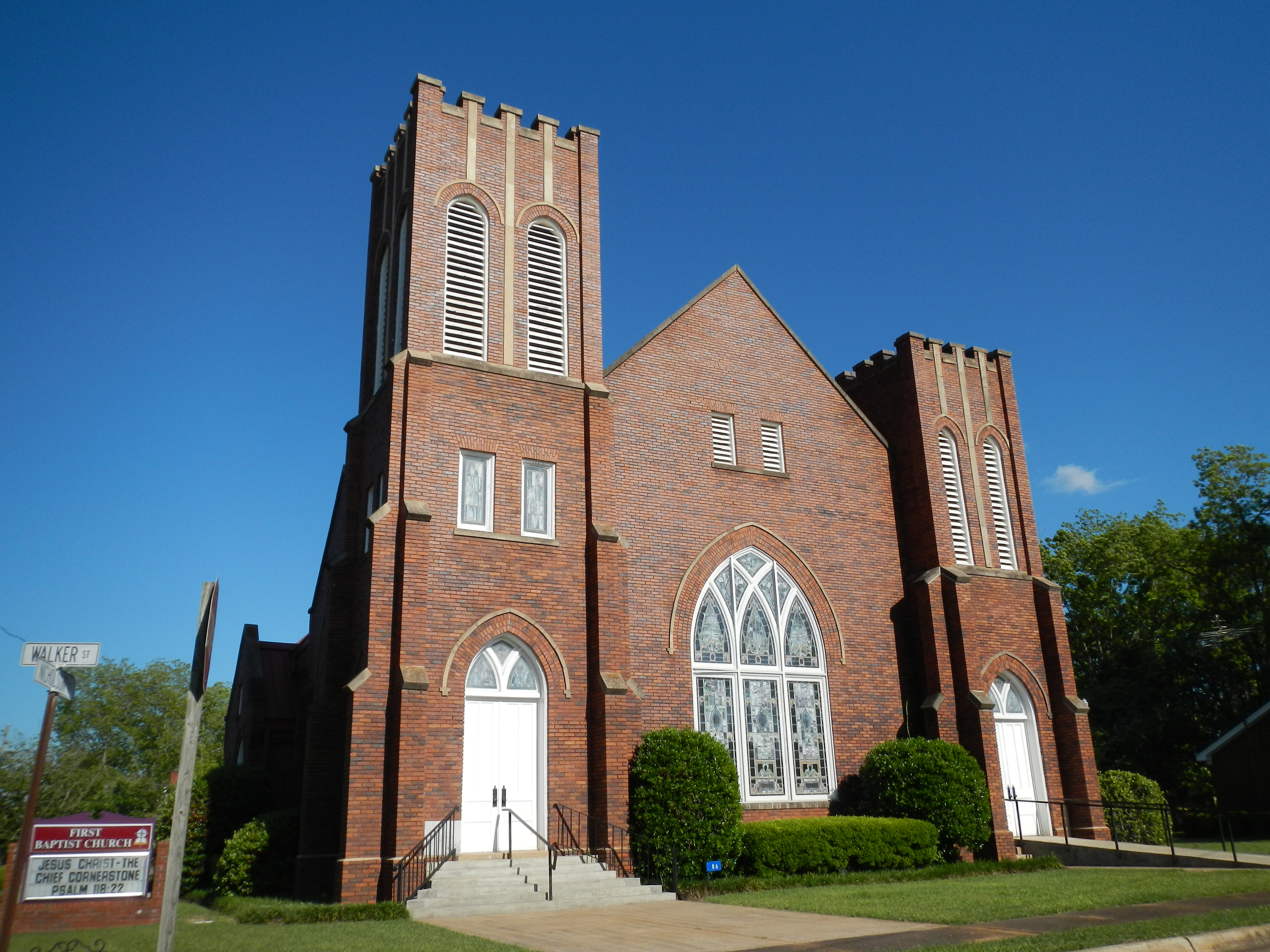
Richland First Baptist Church (c. 1912)

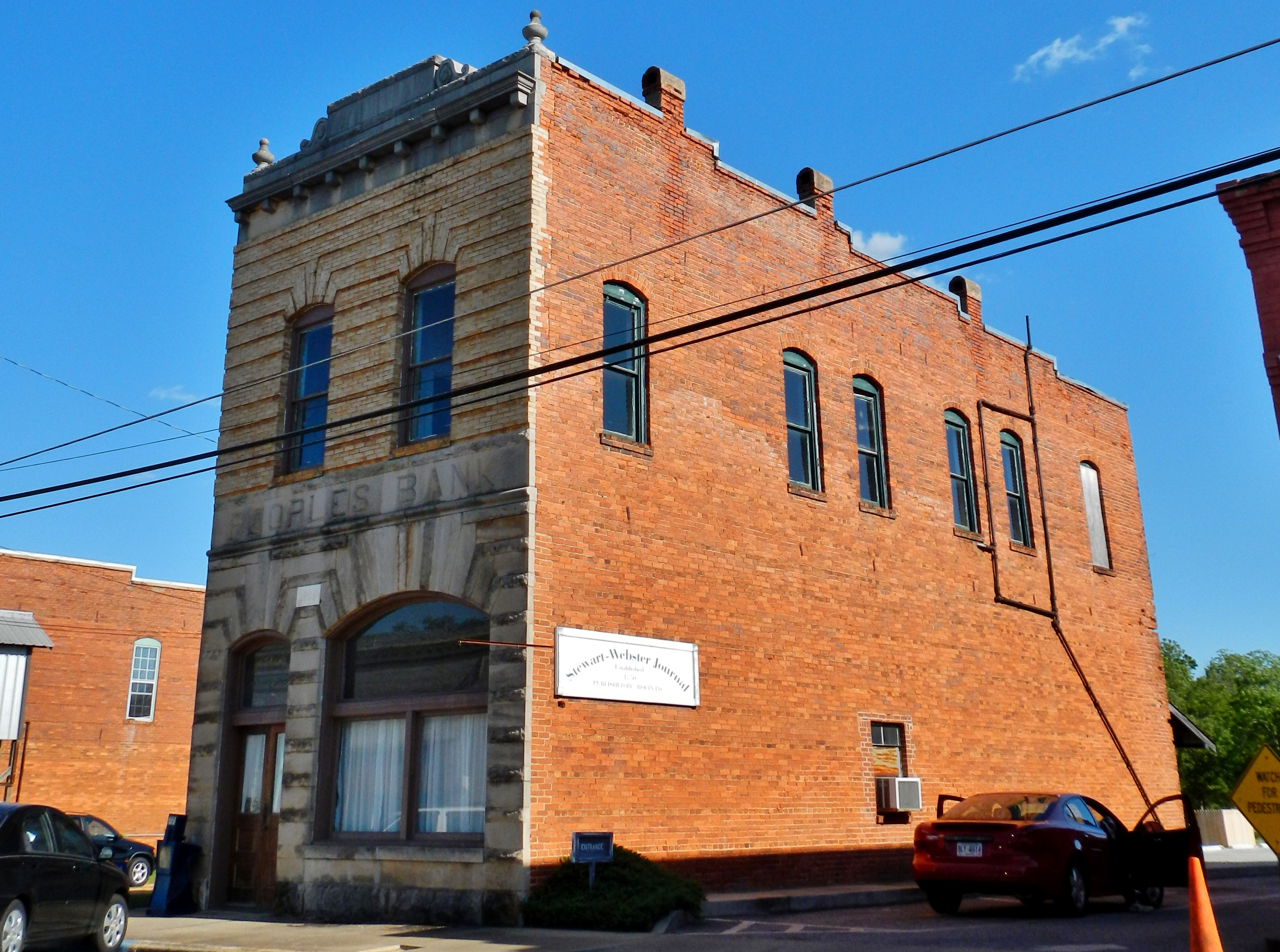
Peoples Bank (c. 1905) is located at 106 Broad St. Now used as the offices for the Stewart-Webster Journal.

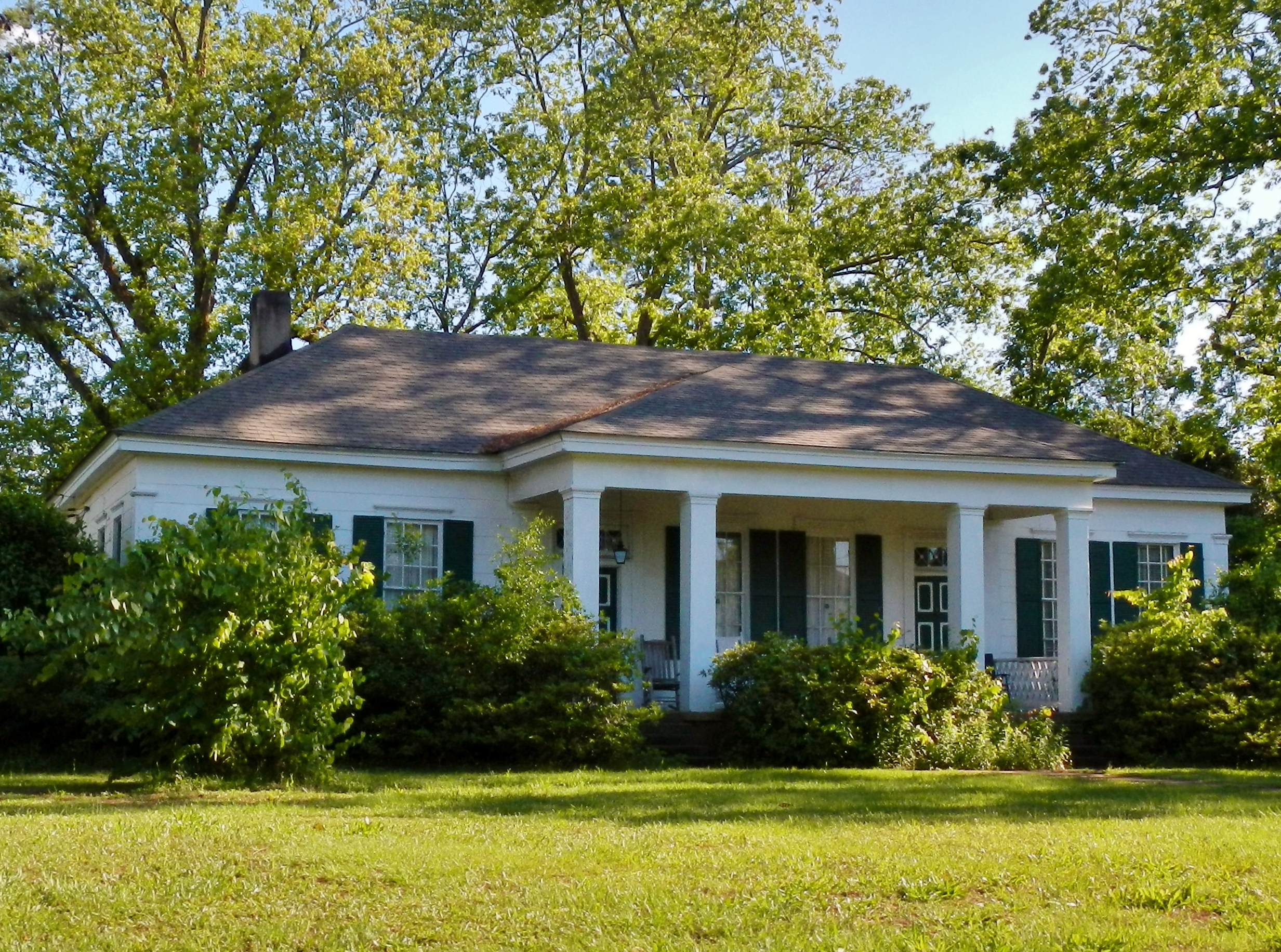
Henry Audulph House (c. 1842)

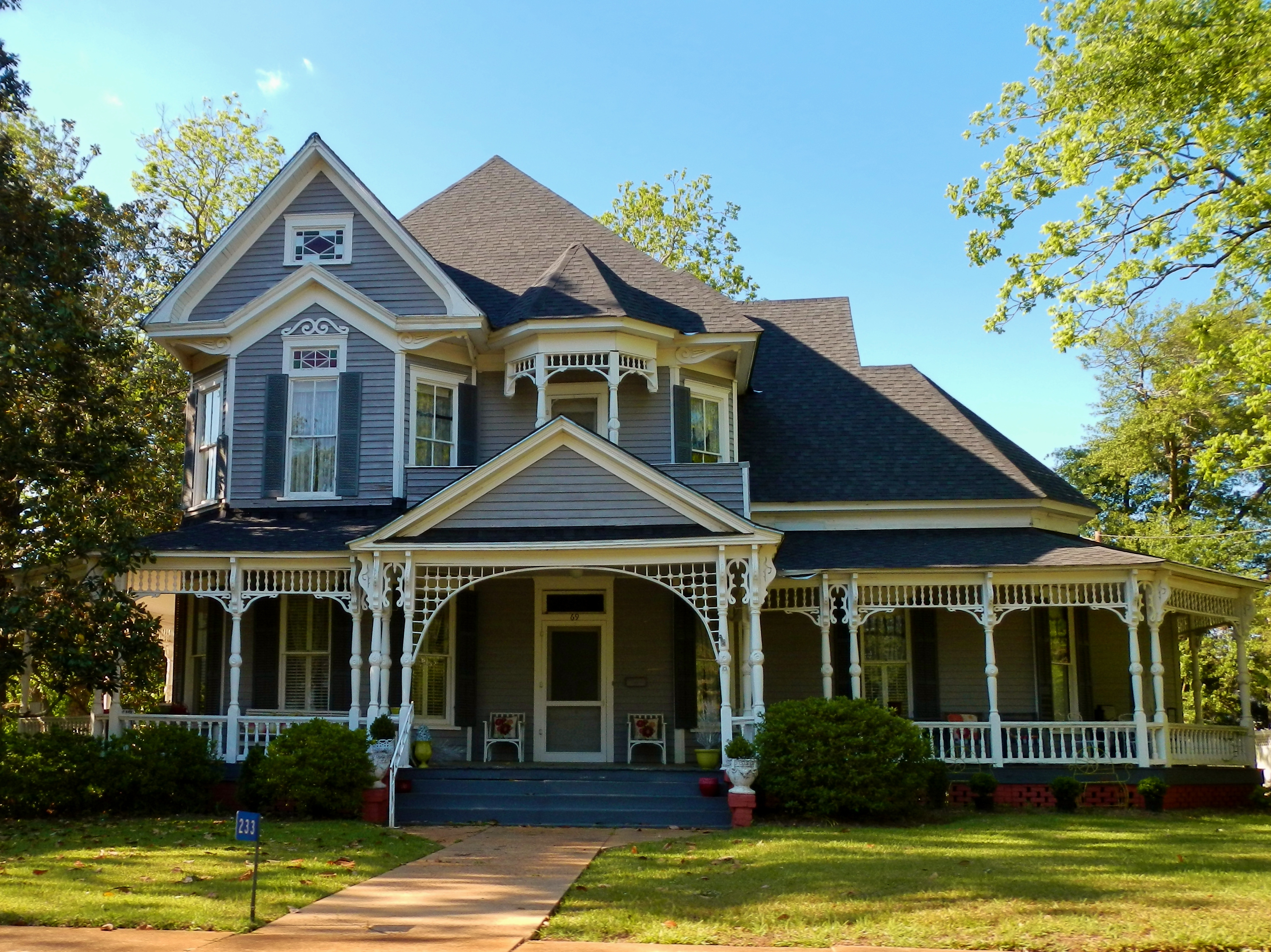
George Lunsford House (c. 1899)

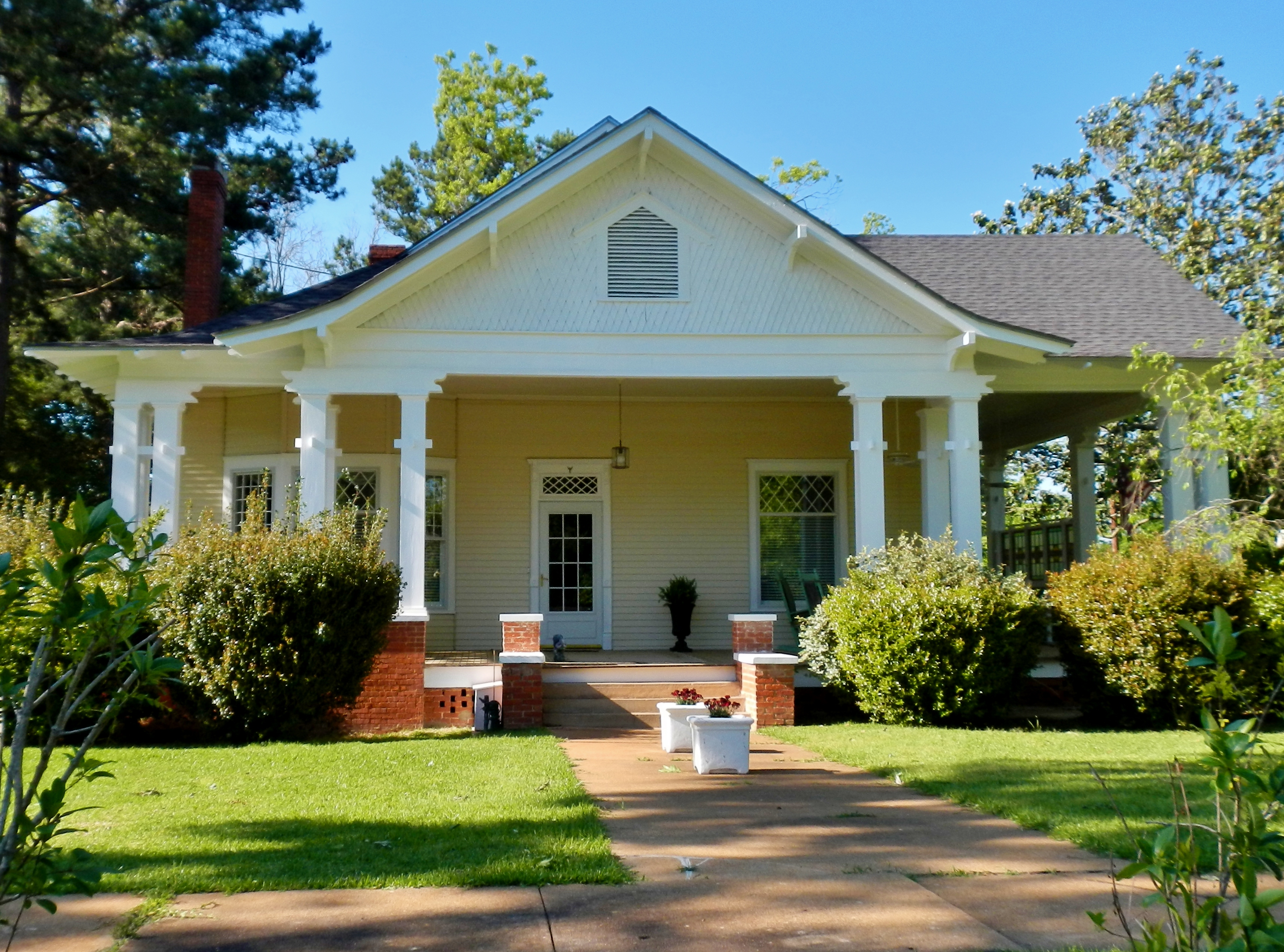
Arthur A. French House (c. 1914)

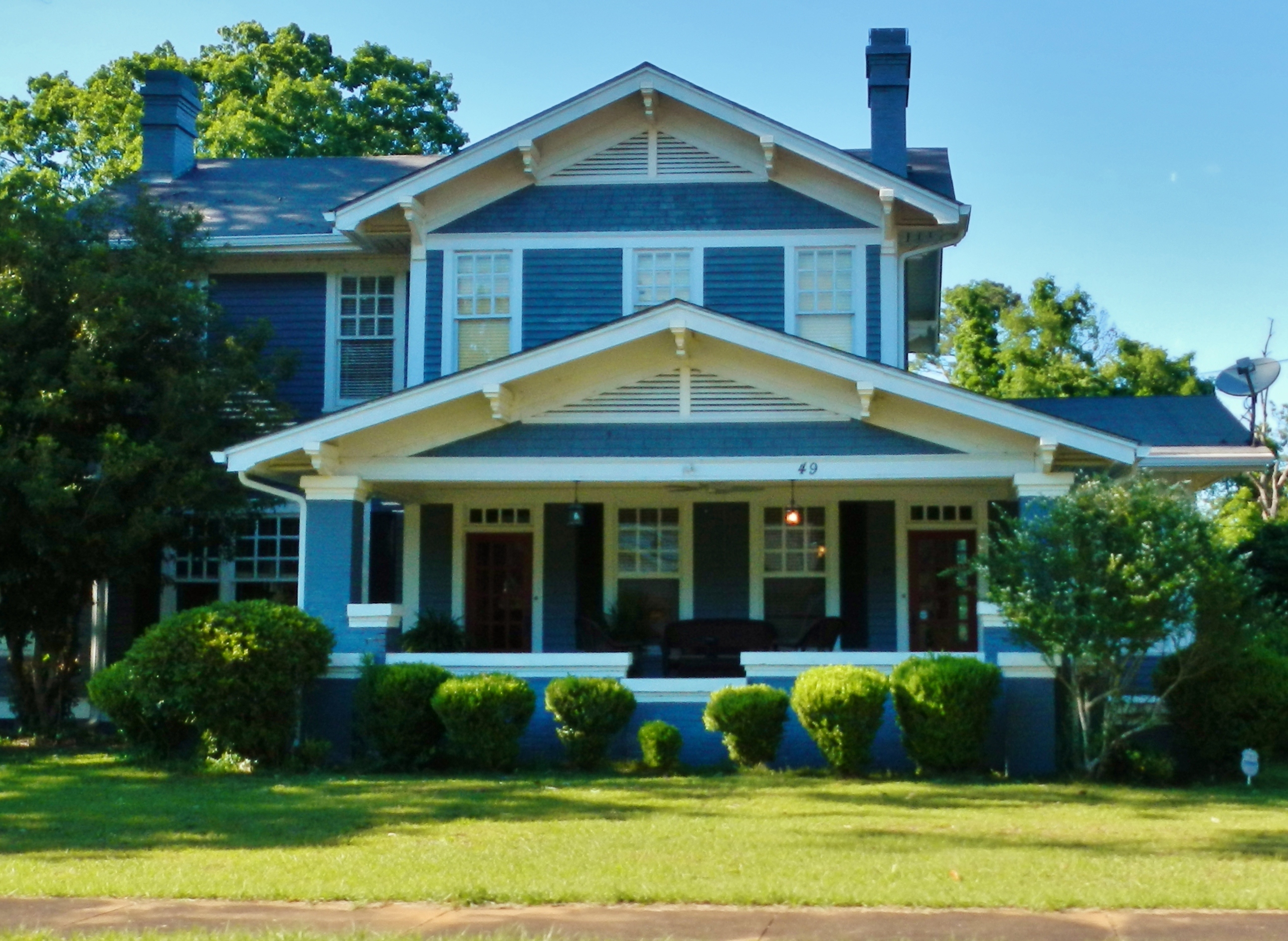
M.P. Wall House (c. 1922)
