= Lumpkin, Georgia =

- City
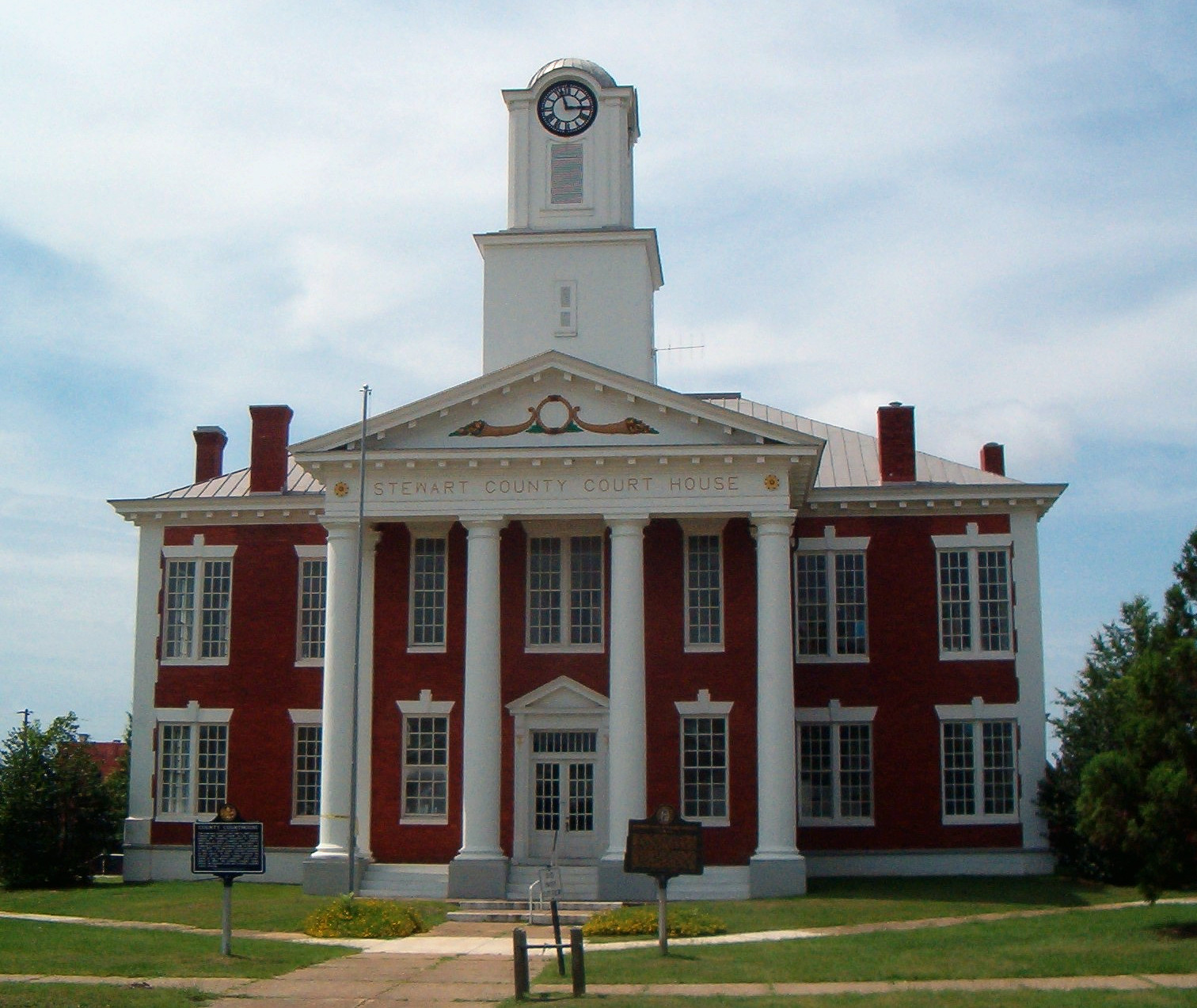
- Stewart County Courthouse in Lumpkin

- Location within Stewart County and Georgia
- Coordinates: 32°2′59″N 84°47′45″W
- Country: United States
- State: Georgia
- County: Stewart

Area
  - Total: 1.60 sq mi (4.14 km^{2})
  - Land: 1.58 sq mi (4.10 km^{2})
  - Water: 0.015 sq mi (0.04 km^{2})
- Elevation: 600 ft (183 m)

Population (2020)
  - Total: 891
  - Density: 563/sq mi (217.5/km^{2})
- Time zone: UTC-5 (Eastern (EST))
  - Summer (DST): UTC-4 (EDT)
- ZIP code: 31815
- Area code: 229
- FIPS code: 13-47980
- GNIS feature ID: 0317484
- Website: cityoflumpkin.org

Lumpkin is a city and county seat of Stewart County, Georgia, United States. Per the 2020 census, the population was 891.

== History ==
This area of Georgia was inhabited by succeeding cultures of indigenous Native Americans for thousands of years before European contact. Historical tribes included the Cherokee, Choctaw and Creek, who encountered European Americans as their settlements moved into traditional territory. During the Indian removal of 1830, the United States government forced such tribes to move west of the Mississippi River to Indian Territory, to extinguish their claims and make way for more European-American settlement.

Lumpkin was incorporated by European Americans on March 30, 1829. First named the county seat of Randolph County on December 2, 1830, it became the seat of Stewart County when the latter was split from Randolph three weeks later. The city was named in honor of Wilson Lumpkin, a two-term governor of Georgia and legislator who supported Indian removal. His namesake county is at the northern end of the state.

The town grew as a commercial center served by stagecoach. Its merchants traded with the planters in the area. This was part of the Black Belt, named for the fertile land in the upland South that supported extensive cotton plantations in the 19th century. In the antebellum years, planters depended on the labor and skills of hundreds of thousands of enslaved African Americans to cultivate and process the cotton for market.

After the war, many freedmen stayed in the area as sharecroppers and tenant farmers, and the economy continued to depend on agriculture. With land erosion and depletion, cotton farming gave way to peanut and pine tree cultivation, and labor needs decreased. The population of the county dropped markedly from the Great Migration of blacks to industrial jobs in the North and Midwest in the early decades of the 20th century, but the town of Lumpkin remained relatively stable. The county is still quite rural.

Lumpkin was the first small town in Georgia to complete a successful historic preservation project to encourage what has become known as heritage tourism. It restored the Bedingfield Inn, built in 1836 and located on the central square. It is listed on the National Register of Historic Places.

On December 5, 1954, a destructive F2 tornado hit the northwest side of town, killing one and injuring 20.

In the 1960s, a group of citizens created a living history complex known as Westville. They relocated 30 historic structures to create a grouping of western Georgia architecture as would have been found in an 1850s working village. Some of the buildings were purchased from the collection of John Word West established in 1928 in Jonesboro, Georgia. The village, staffed by volunteers to give the sense of daily life, has since moved to Columbus, Georgia.

The nearby private Stewart Detention Center houses federal detainees for the U.S. Immigration and Customs Enforcement. The facility is owned and run by CoreCivic. In 2011 Stewart ranked as the largest and busiest such facility in the United States. Stewart County's share of revenue from the federal government, 85 cents per inmate per day, amounted to more than half of the county's entire annual budget. It was removed from the 2020 U.S. Census geography for Lumpkin city hence the decline in population.

== Geography ==
Lumpkin is located at 32°02′59″N 84°47′45″W. U.S. Route 27 passes west of the city, leading north 37 miles (60 km) to Columbus and south 132 miles (212 km) to Tallahassee, Florida. Georgia State Route 27 also passes through the city, leading southwest 24 miles (39 km) to Georgetown on the Alabama state line and east 9 miles (14 km) to Richland.

According to the United States Census Bureau, the city has a total area of 1.6 square miles (4.1 km^{2}), of which 1.6 square miles (4.1 km^{2}) is land and 0.04 square miles (0.10 km^{2}) (1.25%) is water.

== Demographics ==
Historical population
Census	Pop.	Note	%±
1860	765		—
1870	778		1.7%
1880	747		−4.0%
1900	1,470		—
1910	1,140		−22.4%
1920	934		−18.1%
1930	1,103		18.1%
1940	1,210		9.7%
1950	1,209		−0.1%
1960	1,348		11.5%
1970	1,431		6.2%
1980	1,335		−6.7%
1990	1,250		−6.4%
2000	1,369		9.5%
2010	2,741		100.2%
2020	891		−67.5%
U.S. Decennial Census; 1850-1870 1870-1880; 1890-1910 1920-1930; 1940 1950 1960; 1970 1980 1990; 2000 2010 2020

Lumpkin city, Georgia – Racial and ethnic composition Note: the US Census treats Hispanic/Latino as an ethnic category. This table excludes Latinos from the racial categories and assigns them to a separate category. Hispanics/Latinos may be of any race.
Race / Ethnicity (NH = Non-Hispanic)	Pop 2010	Pop 2020	% 2010	% 2020
White alone (NH)	396	246	14.45%	27.61%
Black or African American alone (NH)	893	599	32.58%	67.23%
Native American or Alaska Native alone (NH)	5	6	0.18%	0.67%
Asian alone (NH)	28	0	1.02%	0.00%
Pacific Islander alone (NH)	0	1	0.00%	0.11%
Some Other Race alone (NH)	9	3	0.33%	0.34%
Mixed Race or Multi-Racial (NH)	10	20	0.36%	2.24%
Hispanic or Latino (any race)	1,400	16	51.08%	1.80%
Total	2,741	891	100.00%	100.00%

At the census of 2000, there were 1,369 people, 552 households, and 367 families residing in the city; by 2020, its population declined to 891.

== Government ==
The current mayor of Lumpkin is Jimmy Babb. Charles Gibson, his predecessor, elected in 2010, was the first African-American elected to this office.

== Education ==
The Stewart County School District holds pre-school to grade twelve, and consists of an elementary school, middle school, and high school. The district has 58 full-time teachers and over 704 students.

- Stewart County Elementary School
- Stewart County Middle School
- Stewart County High School

== Notable people ==
- John Cornbread Anderson, American folk artist
- Tommy Brown (singer), American R&B singer
- Dorothy Pitman Hughes, American feminist and civil rights activist
- Jarvis Jones, retired NFL linebacker for the Pittsburgh Steelers
- Alice Tan Ridley (1952 – 2025), singer
- John Wellborn Root, American architect and key figure in Chicago School of design
